= List of hot springs =

There are hot springs on all continents and in many countries around the world. Countries that are well-known for their hot springs include Bulgaria, Canada, Chile, Fiji, Honduras, Hungary, Iceland, India, Japan, Romania, Turkey, Taiwan, New Zealand, and the United States.

== Africa ==
=== Algeria ===
- Hammam Chellala (Thermes Chellala)
- Hammam Essalihine (Thermes de Flavius), 35.4403°N 7.0844°E
- Hammam Guedjima (Thermes Guedjima)
- Guelma (Source de Guelma)
- N'Gaous (Source de Saïda)

=== Democratic Republic of the Congo ===
- Kambo, North Kivu, in North Kivu province (150 to 270 °C)
- Uvira, South Kivu province (275 to 369 °C), 3°22′12″S 29°08′24″E

=== Egypt ===
- Hammam Musa (Moses' Bath)
- Hammam Pharaon (Pharaoh Bath)
- Oyoun Mossa (Moses Springs)
- Siwa

=== Eswatini ===
There are thirteen developed and undeveloped hot spring pools in Eswatini. All are sulphur springs with temperatures ranging from 26 °C to 52 °C.

- Ezulwini spring
- Fairview spring
- Lobamba spring
- Madubula spring
- Mawelawela spring
- Mbekelweni spring
- Mbikwakhe hot spring
- Mbondela spring
- Mkoba spring
- Mpopoma spring
- Mvuntshini spring
- Ngwempisi spring
- Siphofaneni spring

=== Ethiopia ===
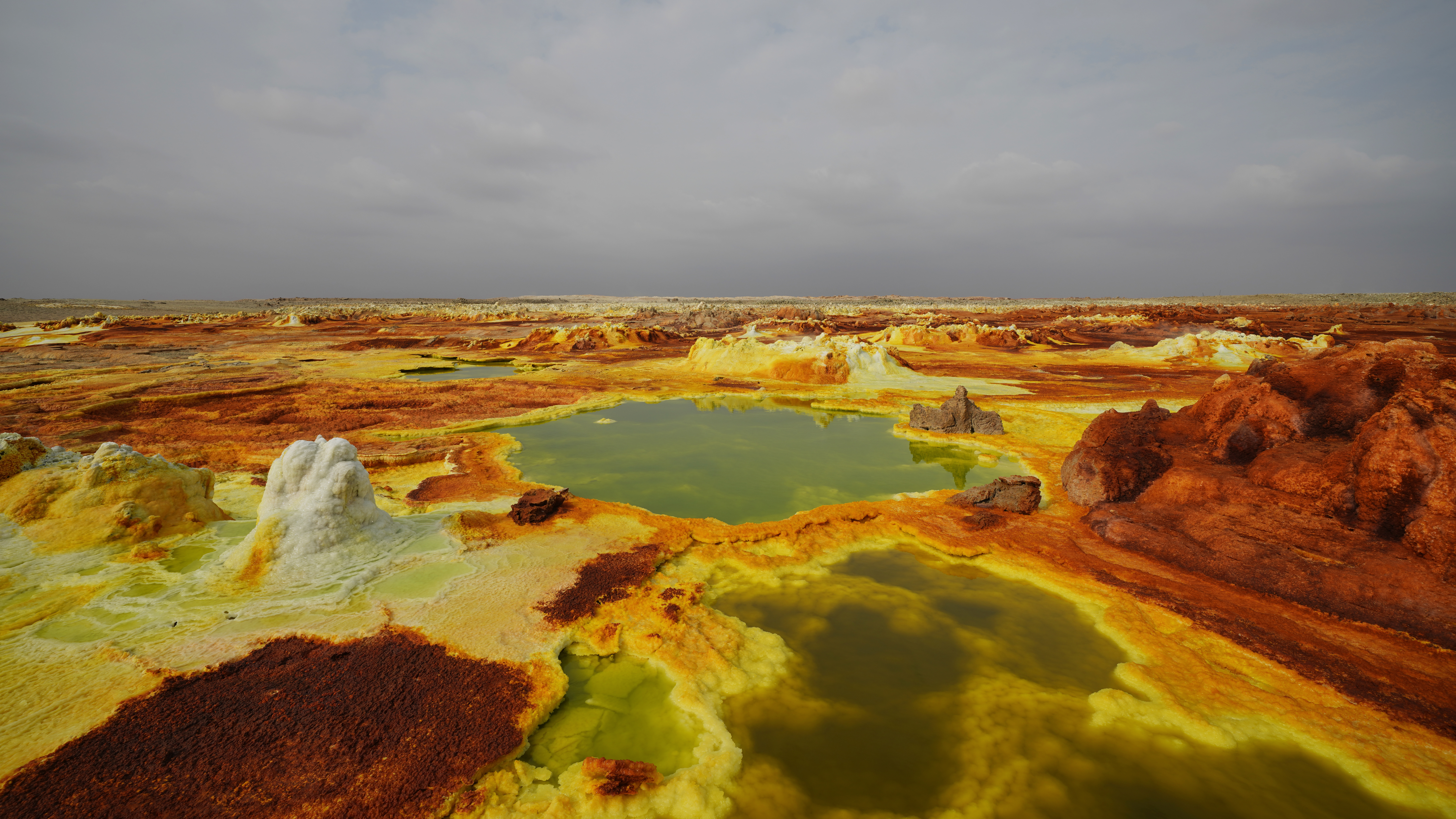
Dallol Hot Spring

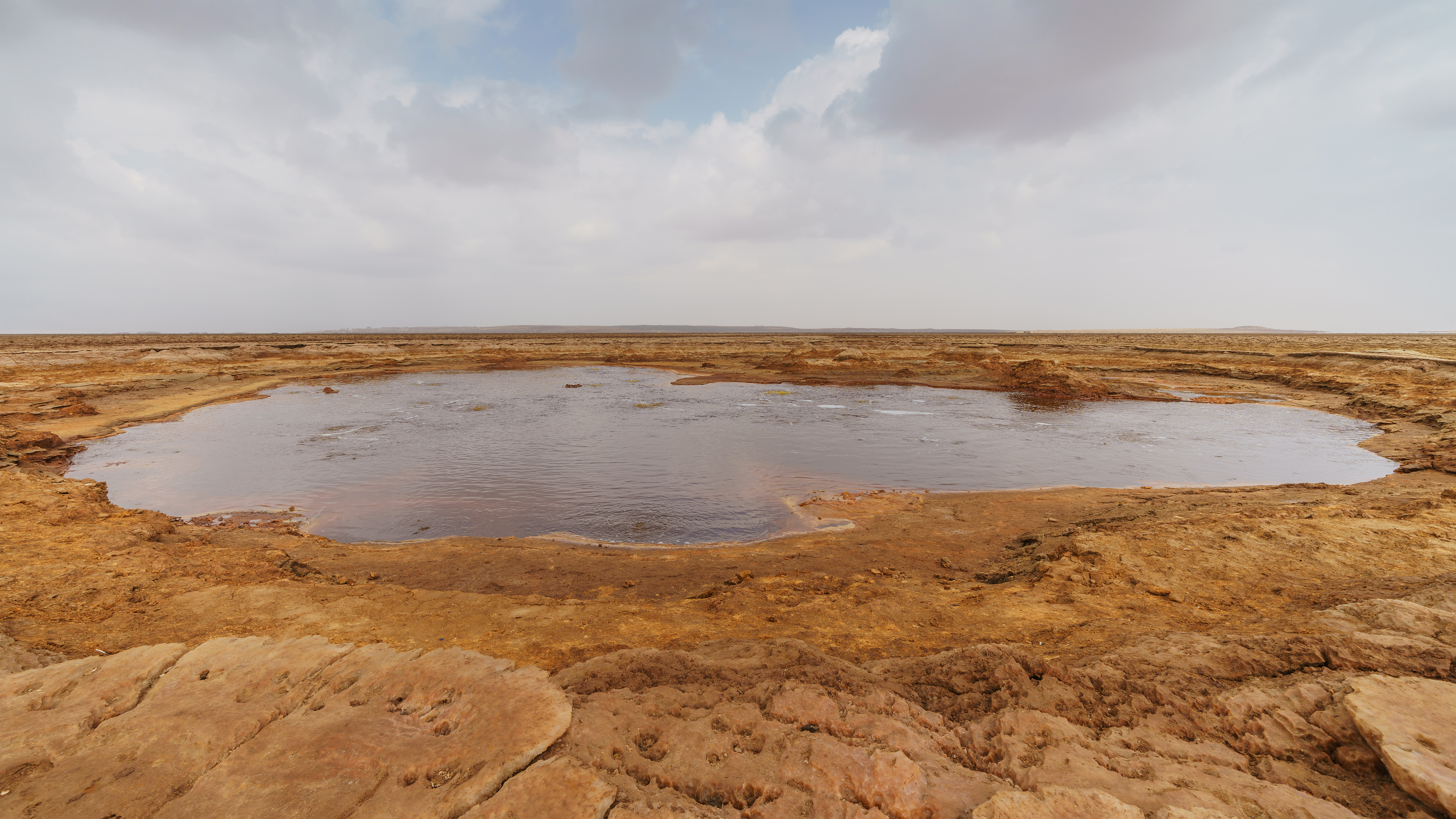
Dallol Volcano - lake with hot springs

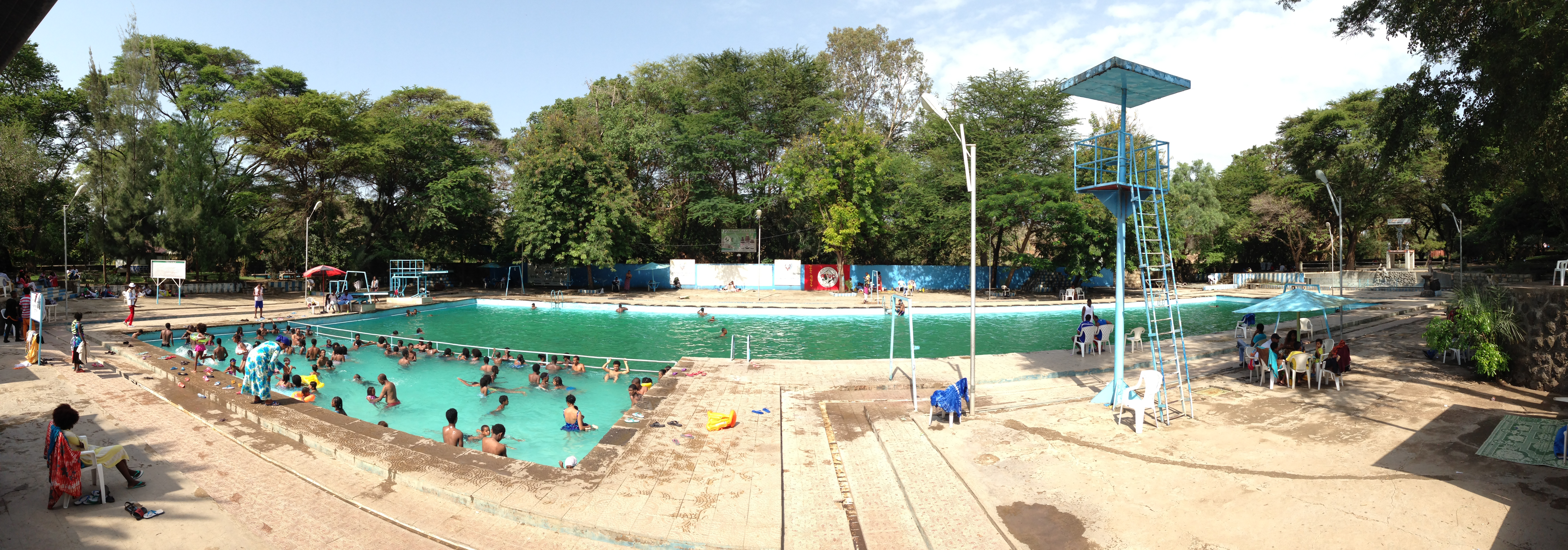
hot springs pool at Sodere, Ethiopia

- Dallol Hot Springs at Dallol volcano, Afar Region, Ethiopia
- Sodere (Oromo: Sodaree), a spa town in central Ethiopia

=== Morocco ===
- Abayou
- Ain al-Ati hot springs in Erfoud
- Ain Allah
- Ain Salama
- Fezouane
- Moulay Yacoub hot springs
- Sidi Harazem hot spring

=== Nigeria ===
- Ikogosi Warm Springs
- Wikki Warm Springs

=== Rwanda ===
- Bugarama Hot Springs, near Cyangugu
- Mashyuza Hot Springs
- Nyakabuye Hot Springs, near Cyangugu

=== South Africa ===
- Aliwal North, Eastern Cape
- Badplaas, Mpumalanga
- Brandvlei, Worcester area, Western Cape
- Caledon Spa
- Goudini Spa, Worcester area, Western Cape
- Montagu, Western Cape
- Tshipise, Limpopo
- Warmbaths, Limpopo

=== Tanzania ===
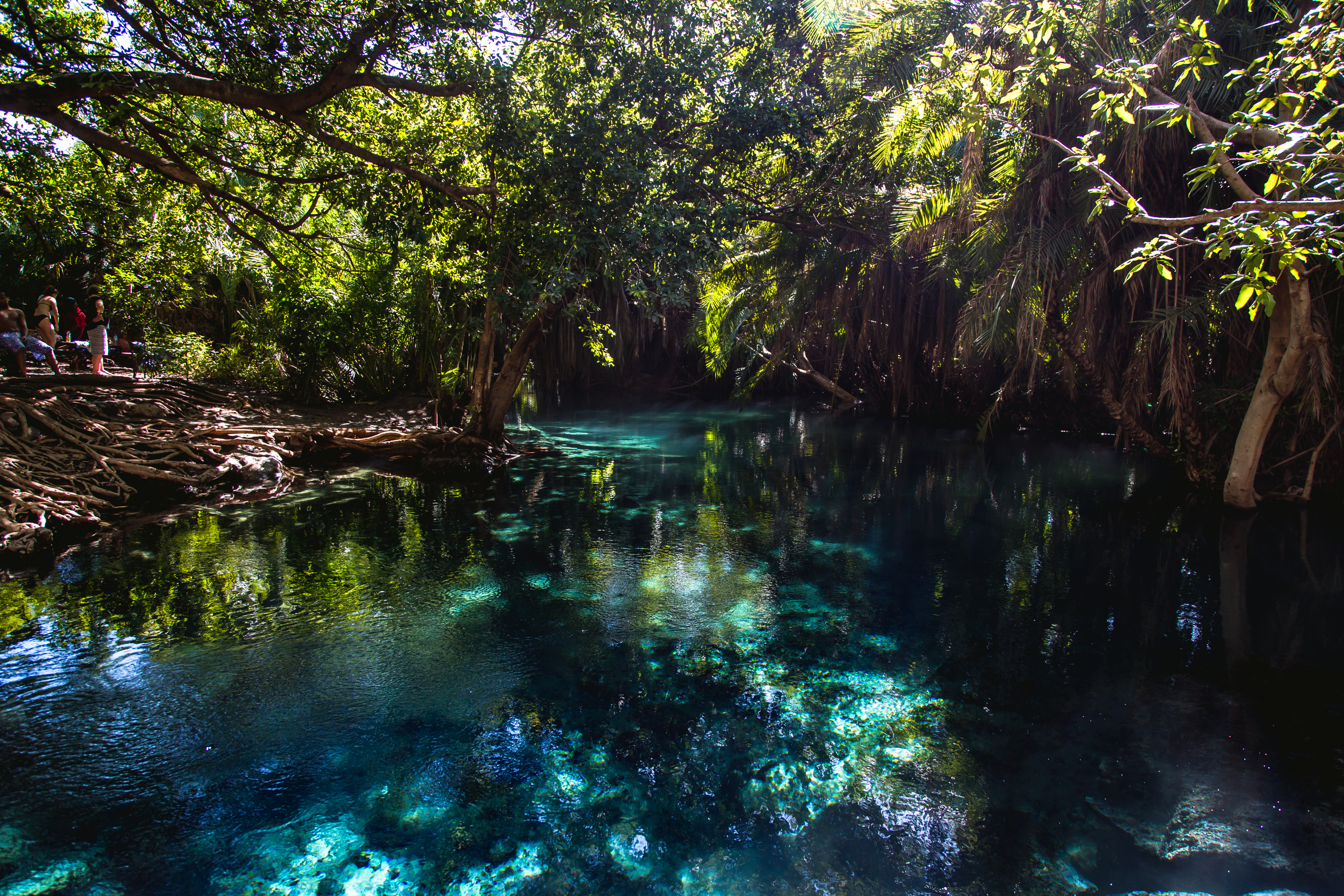
Kikuletwa (Chemka) Hot Springs

At least 15 geothermal areas exist in Tanzania.

- Kikuletwa Hot Springs, also known as Maji Moto, and as Chemka Hot Springs, in the Kilimanjaro region, 40 km from Moshi

=== Tunisia ===
- Abdelkader Hot Springs, near Tozeur
- Abdelkader Hot Springs Gabes, near Gabes
- Abdelkader Hot Springs Ichkeul, near Bizert

=== Uganda ===
- Birara Hot Springs
- Bubaare Hot Spring
- Buranga Hot Springs
- Ihimba Hot Springs
- Kabuga (Muhokya) Hot Springs
- Kagamba Warm Spring
- Kanyineabalongo Hot Springs
- Karungu Hot Springs
- Kibenge (Kyiriba Kya Kyathumba) Hot Springs
- Kibiro Hot Springs
- Kiruruma Hot Springs
- Kisiizi Hot Springs
- Kitagata Hot Springs
- Minera Hot Springs
- Nyamasizi Hot Springs
- Panyamulu Hot Springs
- Rubaare Hot Springs
- Rwagimba Hot Springs
- Rwimi Warm Springs

=== Zambia ===
- Chinyunyu Hot-Springs
- Gwisho Hot-Springs

=== Zimbabwe ===
- Hot Springs, Manicaland
- Binga hot springs, Matabeleland North.

== Americas ==
=== Argentina ===
==== Buenos Aires ====
- Carhué
- Termas de Dolores
- Termas de Luro Hotel & Spa, Pedro Luro
- Termas de Médanos
- Termas de Tapalqué
- Termas del Campo, Necochea
- Termas del Salado, General Belgrano
- Termas Marinas Park, San Clemente del Tuyú

==== Catamarca ====
- Aguas Termales Quebrada de Hualfin, Hualfin
- Complejo Termal La Aguadita, Tinogasta
- Termas de Fiambalá
- Termas de Villa Vil

==== Chaco ====
- Termas de Sáenz Peña

==== Córdoba ====
- Termas de El Quicho

==== Corrientes ====
- Termas de Monte Caseros

==== Entre Ríos ====
- Pozo de Aguas Termales, Santa Ana
- Termas de Basavilbaso
- Termas de Chajarí
- Termas de Colón
- Termas de Concepción del Uruguay
- Termas de Concordia
- Termas de Federación
- Termas de La Paz
- Termas de María Grande
- Termas de San José
- Termas de Victoria del Agua, Victoria
- Termas de Villaguay
- Termas de Villa Elisa
- Termas del Gualeguaychú
- Termas del Guaychú, Gualeguaychú

==== Jujuy ====
- Termas de Caimancito
- Termas de Reyes, San Salvador de Jujuy
- Termas de Tuzgle, Puesto Sey
- Termas del Río Jordán, Calilegua

==== La Pampa ====
- Bernardo Larroudé

==== La Rioja ====
- Termas de La Merced
- Termas de Santa Teresita

==== Mendoza ====
- Termas de Cacheuta
- Hotel Lahuen-Co
- Hotel Termas de Los Molles
- Termas Cajón Grande
- Termas de El Azufre

==== Neuquén ====
- Copahue
- Domuyo
- Termas de Epulafquen
- Termas de Queñi

==== Santiago del Estero ====
- Hostería Termal San Pedro, San Pedro de Guasayán
- Termas de Río Hondo

==== Salta ====
- Rosario de la Frontera
- Termas El Cayotal, Lipeo
- Termas El Sauce, El Bordo

==== San Juan ====
- Termas Pismanta Hotel & Spa

==== San Luis ====
- Balde
- San Gerónimo

==== Tucumán ====
- Hostería Termal Taco Ralo

=== Brazil ===
- Acquamotion, Gramado, Rio Grande do Sul
- Águas de Jurema, Iretama, Paraná
- Águas de Lindoia, São Paulo
- Águas de São Pedro, São Paulo
- Águas Quentes, Barra do Garças, Mato Grosso
- Balneário Pratas, São Carlos, Santa Catarina
- Balneário Thermas de Ouro, Ouro, Santa Catarina
- Caldas de Prata, Nova Prata, Rio Grande do Sul
- Caldas Novas, Goiás
- Grande Hotel Termas de Araxá, Araxá, Minas Gerais
- Foz do Iguaçu, Paraná
- Gravatal, Santa Catarina
- Hotel Thermas, Mossoró, Rio Grande do Norte
- Iraí, Rio Grande do Sul
- Itá, Santa Catarina
- Lagoa Santa, Goiás
- Machadinho, Rio Grande do Sul
- Maestro Thermas Park, Francisco Beltrão, Paraná
- Marcelino Ramos, Rio Grande do Sul
- Olímpia, São Paulo
- Parque Caldas da Imperatriz, Santo Amaro da Imperatriz, Santa Catarina
- Piratuba, Santa Catarina
- Poços de Caldas, Minas Gerais
- Rio Quente, Goiás
- Solar das Águas Quentes, Maringá, Paraná
- Termas de Erval, Erval Velho, Santa Catarina
- Termas do Verê, Paraná
- Termas São João, São João do Oeste, Santa Catarina
- Termas Leonense, Campos Novos, Santa Catarina
- Thermas Clube Parque das Águas, Farroupilha, Rio Grande do Sul
- Thermas de Lins Resort, Lins, São Paulo
- Thermas de Sulina, Paraná
- Vila Capuchinhos Touristic Complex, Vila Flores, Rio Grande do Sul

=== Canada ===
==== Alberta ====
- Banff Upper Hot Springs (Banff National Park), near the Town of Banff
- Cave and Basin National Historic Site, near Banff, Alberta
- Miette Hot Springs, near Jasper, Alberta

==== British Columbia ====
- Ahousat Hot Springs, Ahousat (Gibson Marine Provincial Park)
- Ainsworth Hot Springs and Cody Caves, south of Kaslo
- Bishop Bay Hot Springs, located in Devastation Channel, south of Kitimat, North Coast
- Boulder Creek Hot Springs (aka Pebble Creek Hot Springs and Keyhole Hot Springs) in the Pemberton Valley
- Brandywine Creek Hot Springs
- Canyon Hot Springs and Albert Canyon, near Revelstoke
- Dewar Hot Springs, Purcell Mountains
- Fairmont Hot Springs, near Invermere
- Frizzell Hotsprings, lower Skeena River
- Harrison Hot Springs, north of Agassiz
- Hotspring Island, Haida Gwaii
- Iskut River Hot Springs
- Lakelse Hot Springs, Terrace
- Liard River Hot Springs
- Lussier Hot Springs in Whiteswan Lake Provincial Park
- Meager Creek Hot Springs northwest of Pemberton
- Mount Cayley Hot Springs
- Mount Layton Hot Springs, near Kitimat
- Nascall Hot Springs, located in Dean Channel
- Nakusp and vicinity, along the Arrow Lakes:
  - Coyote Springs
  - Halcyon Hot Springs
  - Halfway River
  - Nakusp Hot Springs
  - Octopus Creek
  - Upper Halfway River
  - Wilson Lake
- Pitt River Hot Springs, on the upper Pitt River
- Prophet River Hot Springs, Alaska Highway
- Radium Hot Springs, Columbia Valley
- Ram Creek Hot Springs, Skookumchuck
- Ramsay Hot Springs near Ahousat
- Shearwater Hot Springs, south of Kitimat, North Coast
- Sherwin Hot Springs, west side of Kootenay Lake, north of Ainsworth Hot Springs
- Skookumchuck Hot Springs (aka Saint Agnes Well and T'sek Hot Spring) between Pemberton and Port Douglas near the town of Skatin (formerly Skookumchuck)
- Sloquet Hot Springs, east of Pemberton between Skatin and Port Douglas
- Stikine Hot Springs in Choquette Hot Springs Provincial Park
- Tallheo Hot Springs, South Bentinck Arm
- Toad River Hot Springs, Alaska Highway
- Weewanie Hot Springs

==== Northwest Territories ====
- Kraus Hot Springs
- Rabbitkettle Hot Springs, Nahanni National Park

==== Yukon ====
- Takhini Hot Springs

=== Chile ===
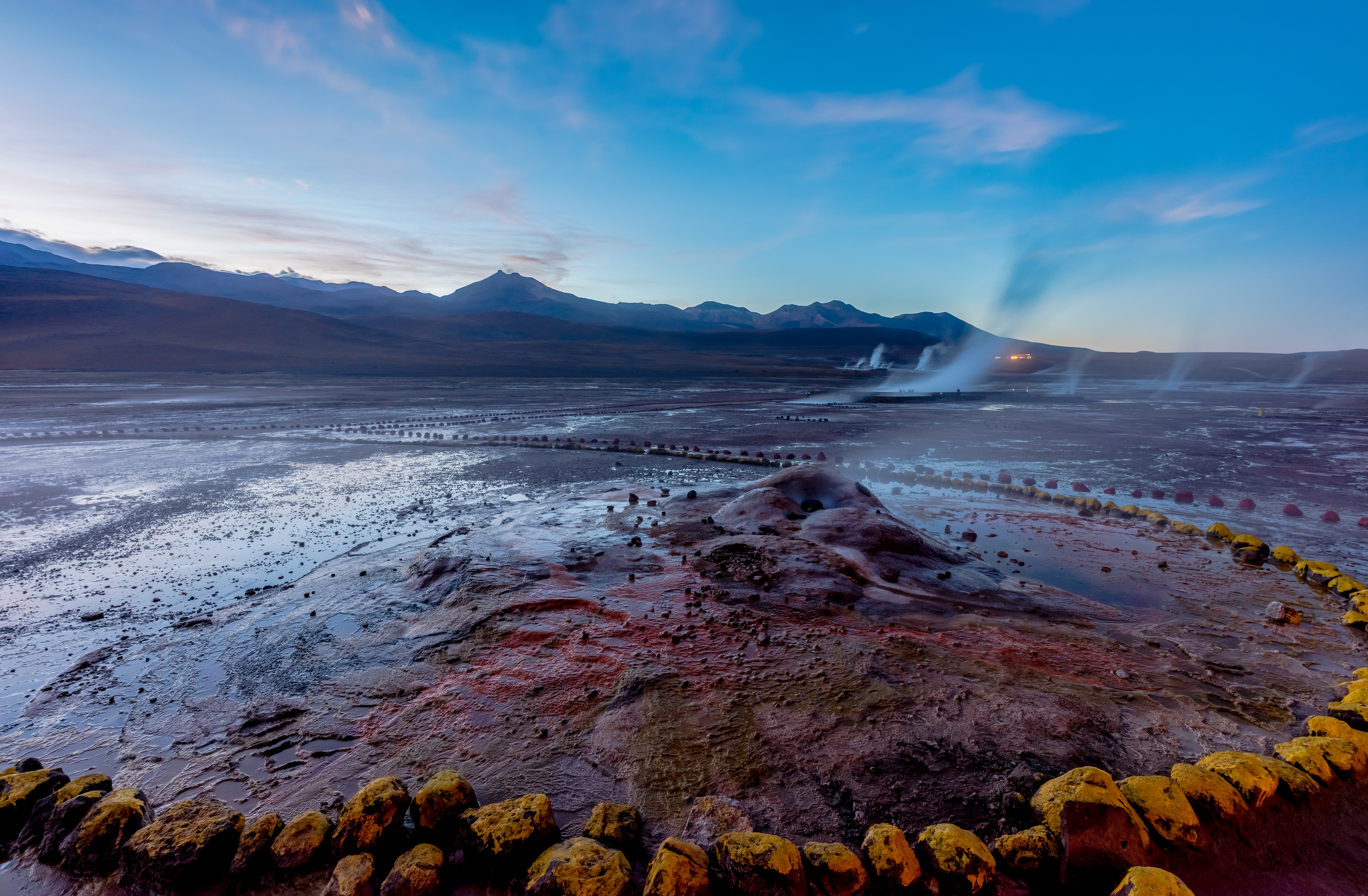
Hot spring geyser vent surrounded by yellow rocks in the El Tatio geothermal field, Chile

There are more than 275 hot springs registered in Chile.

- North Zone, Chile, Atacama Desert
  - Mamiña
  - Pica
  - Puritama
  - Socos
  - El Tatio
- Central Zone, Chile, near Santiago
  - Cauquenes
  - Chillán
  - Corazón
  - Jahuel
  - Panimávida
  - Termas de Catillo, near Parral
- South Zone, Chile, near volcanoes and lakes
  - Chihuío
  - Llifén
  - Malalcahuello
  - Pucón area
    - Huife
    - Menetúe
    - Palguín
    - Termas de San Luis
    - Termas de San Sebastián
    - Termas del Rincón
    - Termas Geométricas, near Coñaripe
    - Termas Vergara
  - Puyehue Lake area
    - Aguas Calientes
    - Los Baños, destroyed by the 2011–2012 Puyehue-Cordón Caulle eruption
    - Puyehue Hot Springs
  - Puyuhuapi
  - Quitralco
  - Seven Lakes area
    - Coñaripe
    - Termas de Liquiñe
  - Termas de Molulco (ei. Termas de Balboa)
  - Termas de Río Blanco
  - Tolhuaca

=== Colombia ===
- Aguas Termales El Raizón, Norte de Santander
- Termales Agua Hirviendo, Puracé, Cauca
- Termales Aguas Calientes, vía al Llano, Cundinamarca
- Termales Cascada Zetaquira, Boyaca
- Termales de Iza, Boyaca
- Termales de Las Juntas, Ibague, Tolima
- Termales de Machetá, Cundinamarca
- Termales de Paipa, Boyaca
- Termales de San Vicente, Santa Rosa de Cabal, Risaralda
- Termales de Santa Mónica, Choachi, Cundinamarca
- Termales de Santa Rosa, Santa Rosa de Cabal, Risaralda
- Termales de Tenjo, Cundinamarca
- Termales del Cañón, Ibague, Tolima
- Termales del Nevado del Ruiz, Manizales
- Termales del Otoño, Manizales, Caldas
- Termales del Zipa, Tabio, Cundinamarca
- Termales El Escondite, Samaná, Caldas
- Termales Tambujina, La Cruz, Narino

=== Costa Rica ===
- Baldi hot springs, Alajuela Province
- La Sierra de Abangares, Guanacaste, 10°17′5.0″N 84°55′39.46″W
- Orosí Valley, near Cartago
- Rincón de la Vieja Volcano & National Park, Guanacaste
- Tabacón, near Arenal Volcano
- The Springs Resort near the Arenal Volcano
- Arenal Springs located at the base of the Arenal Volcano
- Ecotermales Fortuna 2 miles from La Fortuna
- Rio Perdido Hot Springs, Located in the Guanacaste region

=== Dominican Republic ===
- Aguas Calientes Parque De Aguas Termas Naturales Los Montones, San José de las Matas

=== Ecuador ===
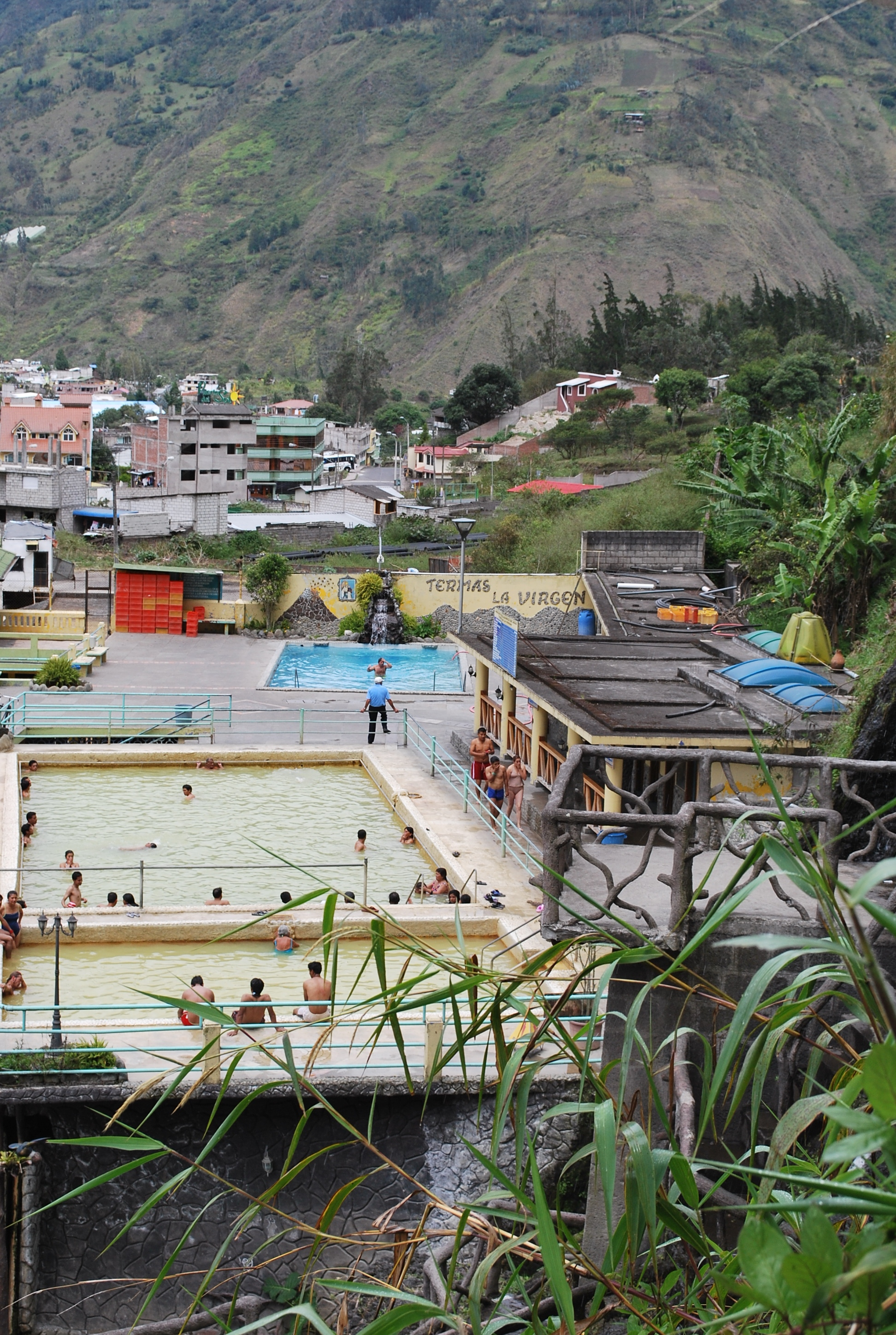
Hydrothermal baths in Baños de Agua Santa, Ecuador

- Aguas Hediondas, near Tulcán, Carchi Province
- Baños, Azuay Province
- Baños de Agua Santa, Tungurahua Province
- Baños de San Vicente, near Salinas, Santa Elena Province
- Chachimbiro, near Ibarra, Imbabura Province
- Nangulví, near Otavalo, Imbabura Province
- Oyacachi, near Papallacta, Napo Province
- Papallacta, Napo Province

=== El Salvador ===
- Los Ausoles, near Ahuachapan, Ahuachapan Department
- Salto de Malacatiupan, near Santa Ana, Santa Ana Department
- Thermales de Santa Teresa, near Ahuachapan, Ahuachapan Department

=== Greenland ===
There are numerous hot springs in Greenland:

- Disko Island, has over 2000 hot springs
- Uunartoq Island, near Alluitsup Paa

=== Guatemala ===
- Fuentes Georginas, Quetzaltenango
- Santa Teresita near Antigua Guatemala, in Amatitlán

=== Mexico ===
- Abasolo, Guanajuato
- Aguascalientes, Aguascalientes
- El Géiser in Tecozautla
- El Pandeño (aka San José de Pandos), outside the towns of Julimes and San Diego de Alcalá, Chihuahua
- Guadalupe Canyon Hot Springs, Mexicali
- Imala, Sinaloa
- La Gruta in San Miguel de Allende, Guanajuato
- Los Azufres, Michoacán
- Mission San Borja Hot Springs, east of the town of Rosarito, Baja California
- Ojo de Dolores and La Cueva del Diablo, in Jiménez, Chihuahua
- Russian Valley Hot Springs, south of Tecate in Baja California
- Tolantongo hot springs
- Tlacotlapilco, Hidalgo
- Valle Chico Hot Springs, southwest of San Felipe

=== Peru ===
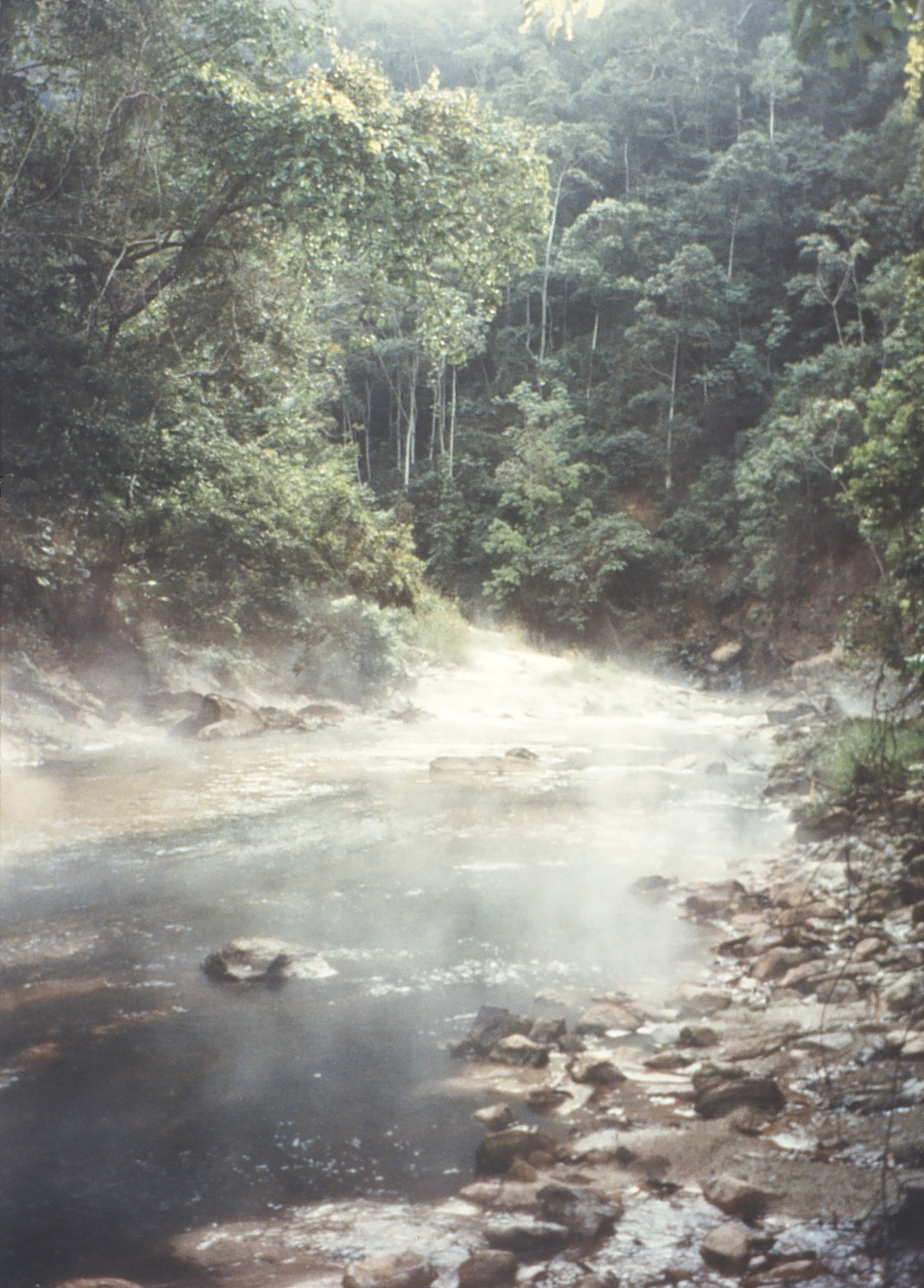
Hot springs in the region of Ayacucho

- Ayacucho Region, 13°09′47″S 74°13′28″W
- Cajamarca, 7°9′52″S 78°30′38″W
- Colca Canyon Hot Springs, near Coporaque, Peru, 15°38′21.9″S 71°39′23.2″W
- Huayhuash, in the Andes, 10°30′S 76°45′W
- Hot springs, Pachia, Tacna
- La Calera Springs, Chivay, 15°38′S 71°36′W
- Machu Picchu Pueblo (known colloquially as Aguas Calientes), near Machu Picchu, 13°9′17.4″S 72°31′31.2″W
- Monterrey Hot Spring, Carhuaz, 9°16′0″S 77°38′0″W
- Moyobamba Region, 6°02′S 76°58′W
- Shanay-Timpishka
- Zorritos, near Bocapán Beach, 3°40′21.6″S 80°39′12.8″W

=== United States ===
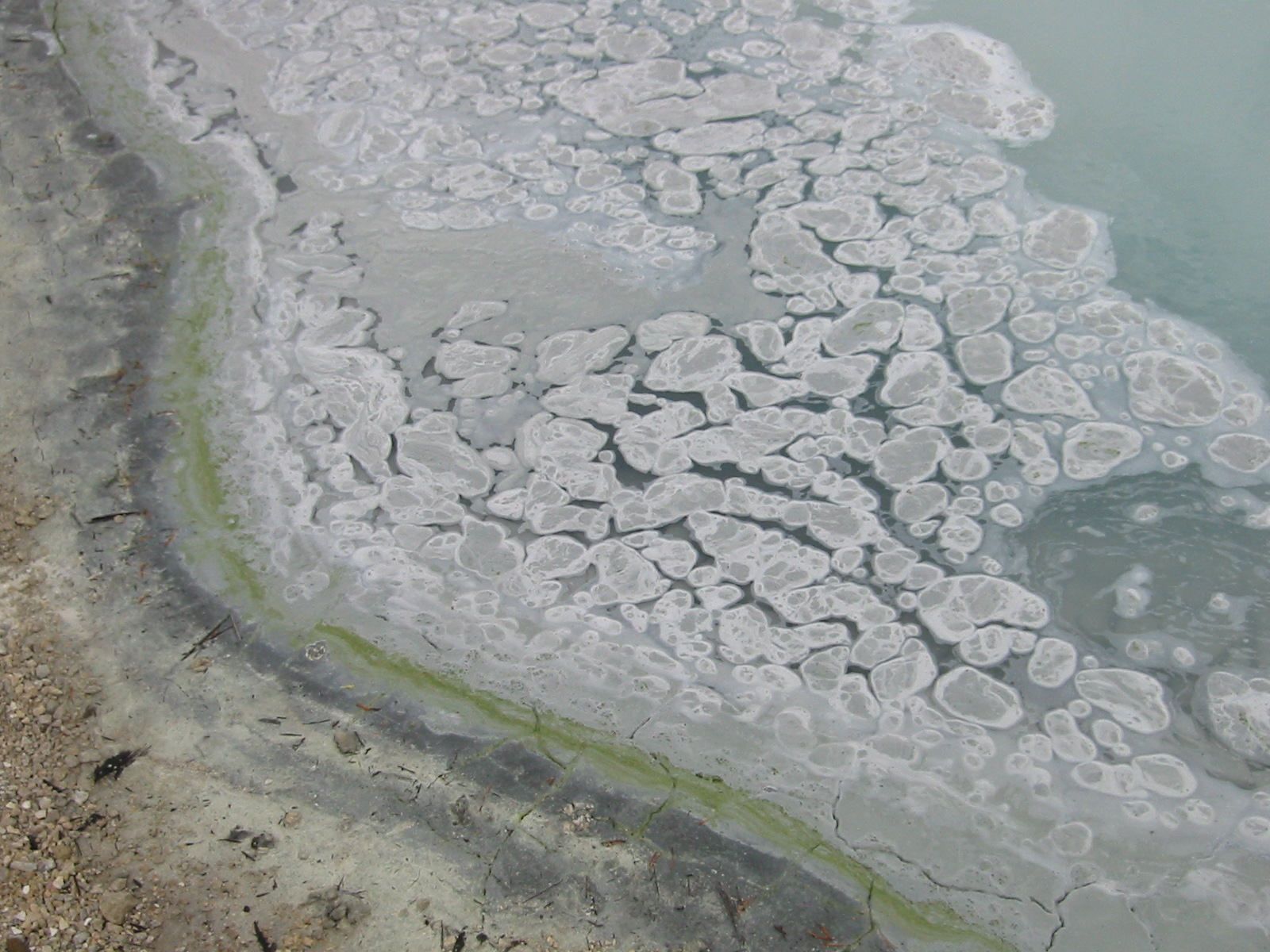
Hot Spring in Lassen Volcanic National Park

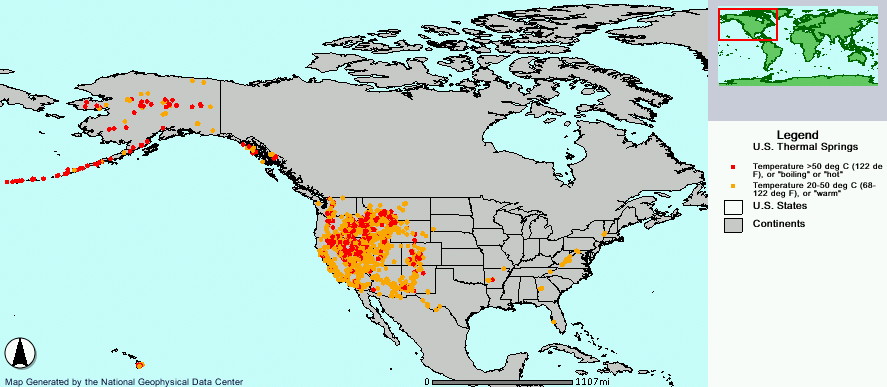
USA geothermal springs

==== Alaska ====
- Akutan Hot Springs
- Baranof Warm Springs (thermal mineral springs), 57°05′22″N 134°49′59″W (nine springs from lukewarm to 120 degrees F)
- Chena Hot Springs (thermal mineral springs), 65°3′11″N 146°3′20″W
- Circle Hot Springs, 65°29′00″N 144°38′03″W
- Kanuti Hot Springs
- Manley Hot Springs, 65°0′28″N 150°37′36″W
- Tolovana Hot Springs, 65°16′0″N 148°52′0″W

==== Arizona ====
- Arizona (Ringbolt) Hot Springs
- Buckhorn Baths, Mesa
- Castle Hot Springs, 33°58′57.9″N 112°21′42.84″W
- El Dorado Hot Springs, 33°29′37″N 112°56′14″W (70 °F/21 °C to 120 °F/49 °C)
- Essence of Tranquility
- Gold Strike Hot Springs
- Hot Well Dunes
- Indian Hot Springs
- Kaiser Hot Springs (latitude: 34.600033, longitude: -113.46285)
- Palm Pool Waterfall Hot Springs
- Pumpkin Spring, in the Grand Canyon
- Roper Lake State Park Hot Spring
- San Carlos Warm Springs
- Sheep Bridge Warm Spring
- Verde Hot Springs, 34°21′25.2″N 111°42′36″W (92° to 104 °F)

==== Arkansas ====
- Hot Springs, 34°29′50″N 93°3′19″W

==== California ====
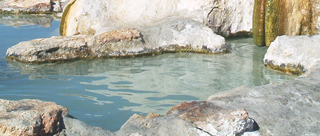
Bridgeport, California Springs

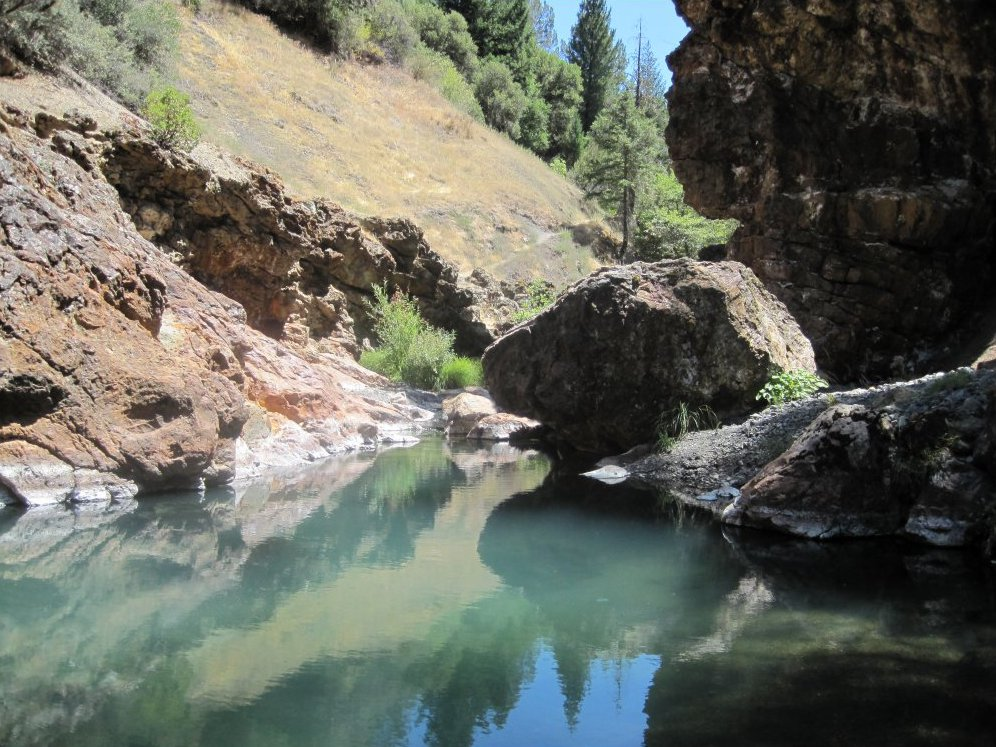
Crabtree Hot Springs, California

- Avila Hot Springs, Avila
- Beverly Hot Springs
- Big Bend Hot Springs, 41°1′11″N 121°54′28″W
- Big Caliente Hot Springs
- Bumpass Hell Creek, Lassen National Park
- Calistoga
- Calistoga Spa Hot Springs
- Campbell Hot Springs, Sierraville CA
- Coso Hot Springs, Inyo County
- Crabtree Hot Springs, on Rice Fork Eel River
- Deep Creek Hot Springs
- Delonegha Hot Springs
- Desert Hot Springs (thermal mineral springs)
- Encino Hot Springs
- Franklin Hot Springs, Paso Robles, California
- Gaviota Hot Springs
- Gilman Hot Springs
- Gilroy Yamato Hot Springs
- Grover Hot Springs State Park
- Harbin Hot Springs, Middletown
- Hot Creek
- Jordan Hot Springs
- Keough Hot Springs
- Mammoth Hot Springs
- Matilija Hot Springs
- Mercey Hot Springs
- Miracle Hot Springs
- Mono Hot Springs
- Montecito Hot Springs
- Murrieta Hot Springs
- Palm Springs
- Paso Robles Hot Springs
- Remington Hot Springs
- Saline Valley Hot Springs
- San Juan Hot Springs
- Scovern Hot Springs
- Sespe Hot Springs
- Slates Hot Springs, Esalen
- Tassajara Hot Springs
- Travertine Hot Springs
- Warner Springs
- Wilbur Hot Springs, in Colusa County
- Willett Hot Springs
- White Sulphur Springs (California)

==== Colorado ====
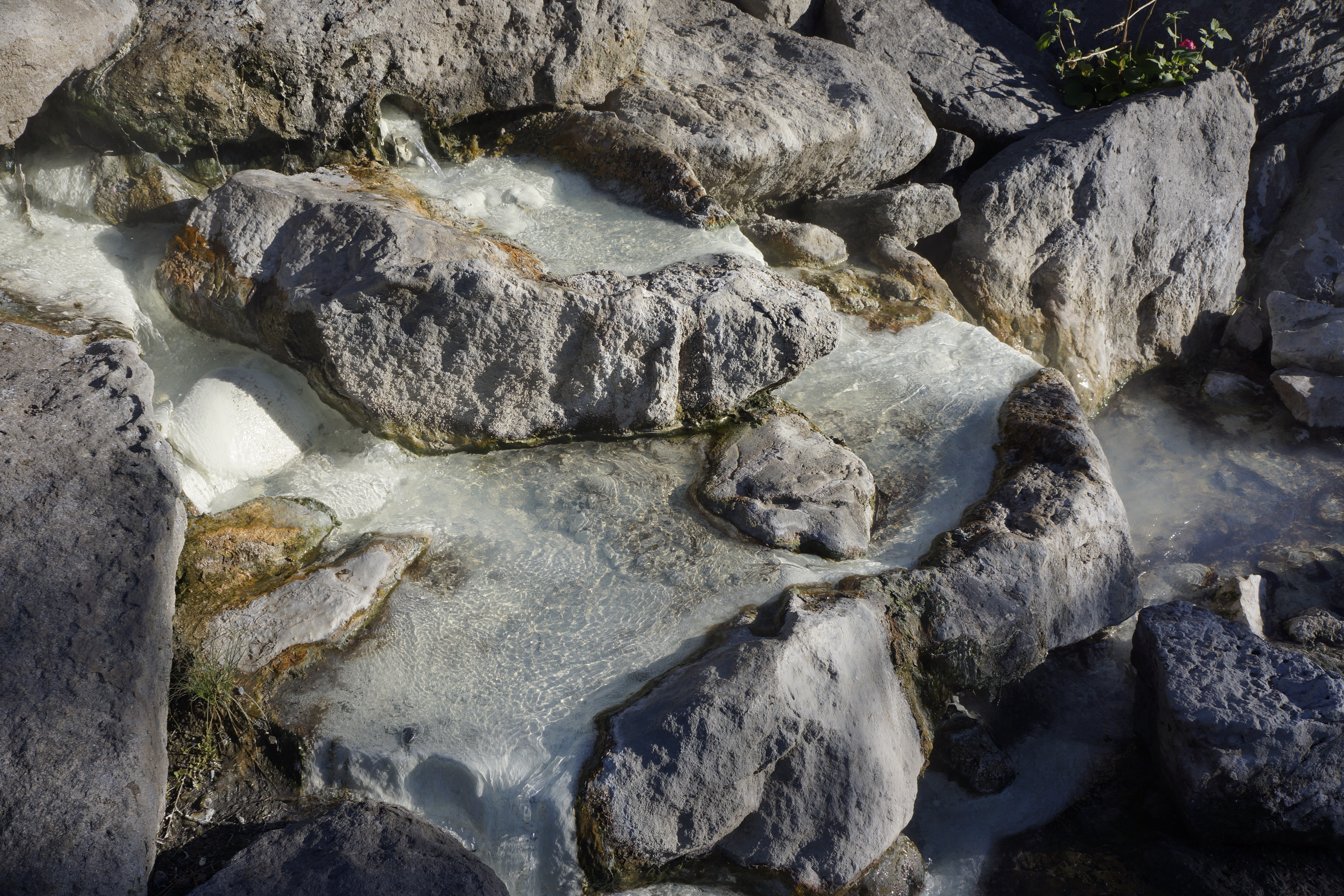
Pagosa Hot Spring, Colorado

- Conundrum Hot Springs
- Hot Sulphur Springs
- Idaho Springs
- Glenwood Springs
- Ouray
- Pagosa hot springs (110 °F to 144 °F/62 °C), 37°16′5″N 107°1′28″W
- Penny Hot Springs
- Radium Hot Springs
- Steamboat Springs

==== Florida ====
- Warm Mineral Springs

==== Georgia ====
- Radium Springs (20 °C, 68 °F)
- Warm Springs (90 °F)

==== Idaho ====
- Boat Box Hot Spring
- Frenchman's Hot Springs
- Goldbug Hot Springs
- Green Canyon Hot Springs
- Heise Hot Springs, Ririe (28 °C, 82 °F)
- Lava Hot Springs (thermal mineral springs)
- Silver Creek Hot Spring
- Stanley Hot Springs
- Sunflower Hot Springs

==== Illinois ====
- Little Hot Springs of Illinois

==== Massachusetts ====
- Sand Spring (75 °F / 24 °C)

==== Montana ====
- Chico Hot Springs (104 °F / 40 °C)
- Gregson Hot Springs
- Hot Springs
- Hunters Hot Springs
- Lolo Hot Springs Montana
- Sleeping Buffalo Hot Springs

==== Nevada ====
- Ash Springs, N 37° 27.810' W 115° 11.547' (95 °F)
- Bartine Hot Springs (108 °F)
- Bathtub Spring (Soldier Meadows)
- Bog Hot Springs (105 °F)
- Bowers Mansion Hot Springs (116 °F)
- Carson Hot Springs (95°–110 °F)
- Chukar Gulch (Soldier Meadows) (104 °F)
- Crescent View Hot Springs (185 °F)
- Crystal Springs hot springs, Crystal Springs, Nevada ghost town (81 °F–90 °F)
- Diana's Punchbowl (183°)
- Dry Suzie (Hot Sulphur) Hot Springs (145 °F)
- Duckwater Pond (90 °F)
- Dyke Hot Spring (150 °F)
- Elko Hot Hole
- Fish Lake Hot Well (102 °F)
- Fly Geyser
- Hot Creek Springs and Marsh Area (85 °F)
- Hyder Hot Springs (95°–150 °F)
- Jersey Valley Hot Springs (120 °F)
- McFarlane Hot Springs (140°–170 °F)
- New Wagner Warm Spring (87 °F)
- Panaca Warm Springs (78°–86 °F)
- Paradise Valley Hot Springs
- Pinto Hot Springs (East) (109 °F)
- Pott's Ranch Hot Spring (113 °F)
- Reese River Hot Springs (Valley of the Moon) (105 °F)
- Rogers Warm Spring
- Ruby Valley (106°–122 °F)
- Smith Creek (Rainbow) Hot Springs (197°)
- Soldier Meadows Hot Creek (106°–112 °F)
- Soldier Meadows hot spring system
- Soldier Meadows Warm Pond (85 °F)
- Spencer Hot Springs (101°)
- Steamboat Hot Well (204 °F)
- Trego Hot Springs (185 °F)
- Twelve Mile Hot Springs
- Virgin Valley Hot Springs
- Walker Warm Springs (110°–120°)

==== New Mexico ====
- Black Rock Hot Springs, near Taos
- Faywood Hot Springs
- Jordan Hot Springs (Gila National Forest)
- Manby Hot Springs, near Taos
- McCauley Hot Springs, Jemez Springs
- Melanie Hot Springs, near Silver City
- Middle Fork Hot Springs (Gila National Forest)
- Montezuma Hot Springs
- Ojo Caliente Hot Springs, Ojo Caliente
- Radium Hot Springs
- San Antonio Hot Springs, Jemez Springs
- Soda Dam Hot Spring
- Spence Hot Spring, Jemez Springs
- Stagecoach Hot Springs, near Aroyo Hondo, NM
- Truth or Consequences Hot Springs
- Turkey Creek Hot Springs (Gila National Forest)

==== New York ====
- Lebanon Springs
- Saratoga Springs (Roosevelt Spring, Lincoln Spring, etc.)

==== North Carolina ====
- Hot Springs

==== Oregon ====
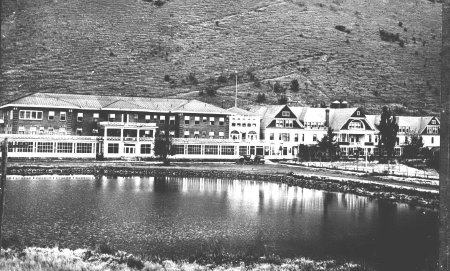
Hot Lake Hotel built in 1906 in Hot Lake, Oregon. The resort became a worldwide attraction for its geothermal mineral waters.

- Alvord Hot Springs
- Antelope Hot Springs
- Bagby Hot Springs
- Belknap Hot Springs
- Breitenbush Hot Springs (thermal mineral springs)
- Cougar Hot Springs
- Deer Creek Hot Springs
- Hart Mountain Hot Springs
- Hot Lake Springs
- Hunters Hot Springs
- McCredie Hot Springs
- Mickey Hot Springs
- Summer Lake Hot Springs
- Umpqua Hot Springs

==== South Dakota ====
- Hot Springs

==== Texas ====
- Chinati Hot Springs, near Ruidosa
- Hot Springs (Big Bend National Park)

==== Utah ====
- Baker Hot Springs, Fumarole Butte, Juab County
- Blue Lake, Wendover
- Crystal Hot Springs, Honeyville
- Fifth Water Hot Springs, Three Forks Trailhead, Diamond Fork Canyon, Uinta National Forest
- Homestead, Midway
- Meadow Hot Springs
- Mystic Hot Springs, Monroe, also known as Monroe Hot Springs and Cooper Hot Springs
- Pa Tempe Hot Springs, La Verkin
- Saratoga Springs
- Veyo Pool, Veyo

==== Virginia ====
- Hot Springs
- Warm Springs

==== Washington ====
- Carson Hot Springs
- Olympic Hot Springs
- Scenic Hot Springs
- Sol Duc Hot Springs

==== West Virginia ====
- Berkeley Springs State Park

==== Wyoming ====
- Black Sand Basin Hot Springs
- Boiling River (Yellowstone National Park)
- Brilliant Pool Hot Springs
- Hot Springs State Park, Thermopolis
- Mammoth Hot Springs
- Morning Glory Pool
- Saratoga

A list of 1661 hot springs can be found on the NOAA Thermal Springs List for the United States. The same list with added notes and links can be found on the USA Hotsprings Database.

=== Uruguay ===
- Termas de Almirón
- Termas de San Nicanor
- Termas del Arapey
- Termas del Daymán
- Termas del Guaviyú

=== Venezuela ===
- El Borbollon
- El Pilar (Rio Aguas Calientes)
- Las Trincheras

== Antarctica ==
- Deception Island

== Asia ==
=== Bhutan ===
- Bumthang
  - Dhur Tshachu
- Gasa
  - Gasa Tsachu
  - Gayza Tshachu
  - Wachey Tsachu
- Lhuntse
  - Khambalung gNey Tshachu
  - Pasalum Tshachu
  - Yoenten Kuenjung Tshachu
- Punakha
  - Chuboog Tshachu
  - Koma Tshachu
- Sarpang
  - Gelephu Tshachu
- Zhemgang
  - Duenmang Tshachu

=== China ===
- Anbo Hot Spring and Laotieshan Hot Spring, Dalian
- Conghua Hot Spring and Zhongshan Hot Spring, Guangdong Province
- Hailuogou Hot Spring, Sichuan Province
- Jinping Mengla Hot Spring, Yunnan Province
- Longsheng Hot Spring, Guangxi Province
- Tangchi Hot Spring and Xianning Hot Spring, Hubei Province
- Tanggangzi Hot Spring, Anshan
- Tibet Paillong Hot Spring, Tibet
- Wulongbei Hot Spring, Dandong
- Xanxi Hot Spring, Ningbo-Ninghai, Zhejiang Province
- Xiongyue Hot Spring, Yingkou, Liaoning Province

=== India ===
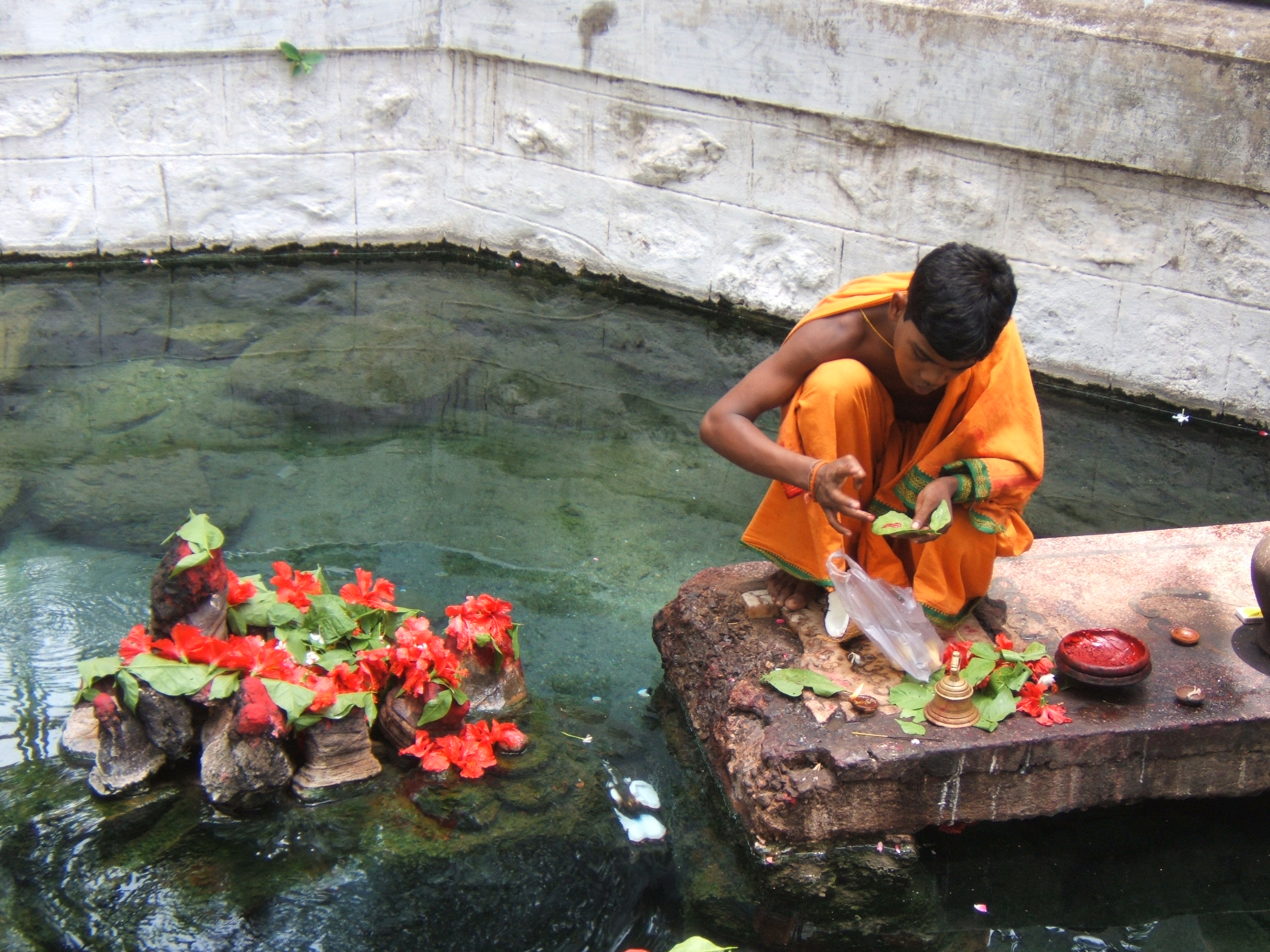
A young Hindu priest performing religious rituals at Taptapani hot spring in India

==== Assam ====
- Garampani, Garampani Wildlife Sanctuary, Karbi Anglong district

==== Bihar ====
- Rajgir, Nalanda
- Rishi Kund
- Sita Kund Hot Spring
- Suryakund, Near Gaya

==== Gujarat ====
Geological Survey of India has found 17 hot springs in Gujarat:

- Dholera
- Kavi/Kawa, Jambuasar Taluka, Bharuch district
- Lalpur
- Lasundra, Kathlal Taluka, Kheda district
- Savarkundla
- Tulsishyam, near Tulsishyam temple, Gir Forest, Junagadh district
- Tuwa, Godhra Taluka, Panchmahal district
- Unai, near Vansda
- Other dormant springs are located at Chabsar, Cambay Wells, Ghogha, Harsan, Khedapad, Khar, Maktapar, Warha and Mithapur.

==== Haryana ====
- Sohna hot spring, Sohna, Gurgaon, 56 kilometres (35 mi) from Delhi

==== Himachal Pradesh ====
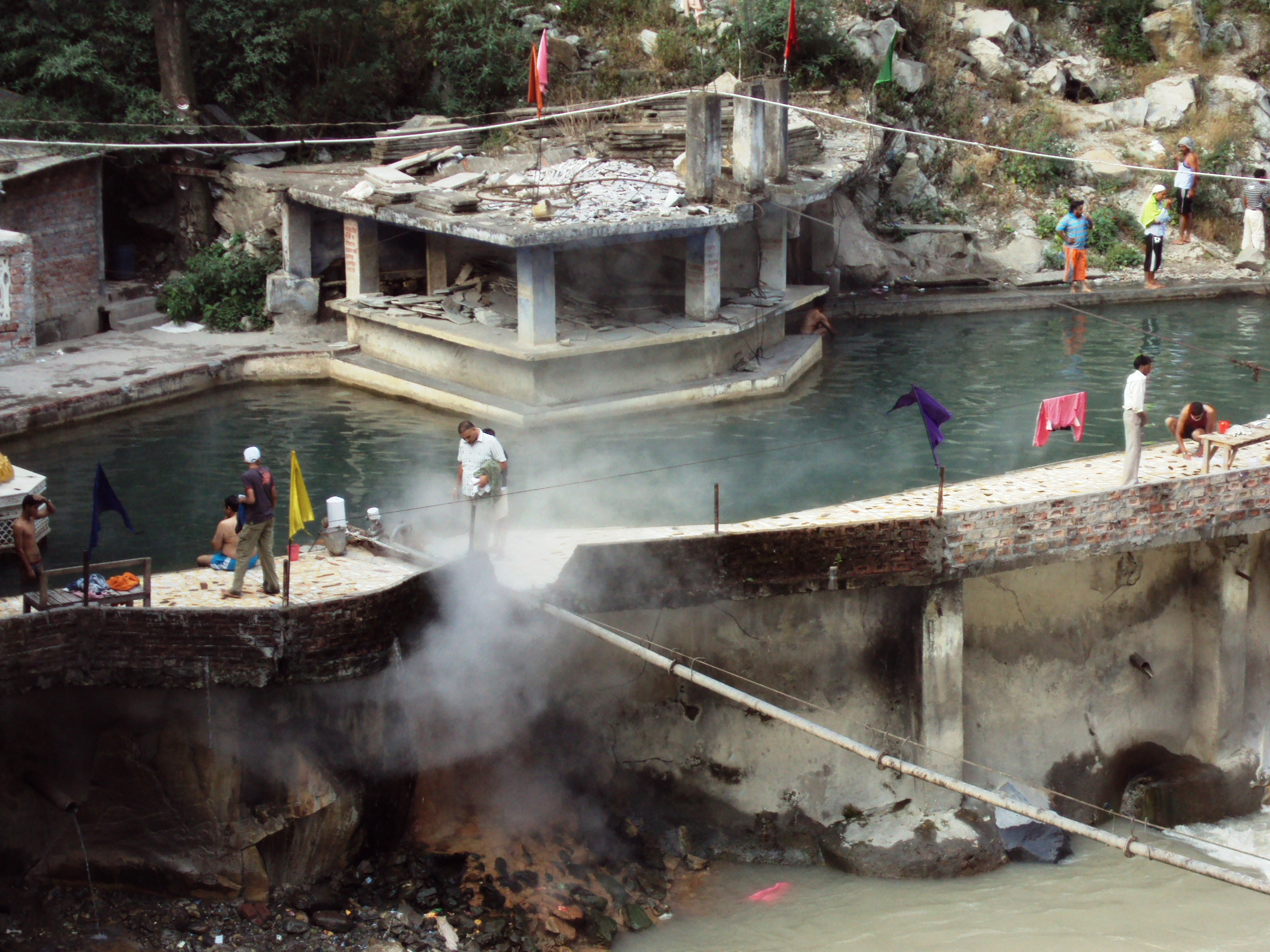
Hot springs at Manikaran, Himachal Pradesh

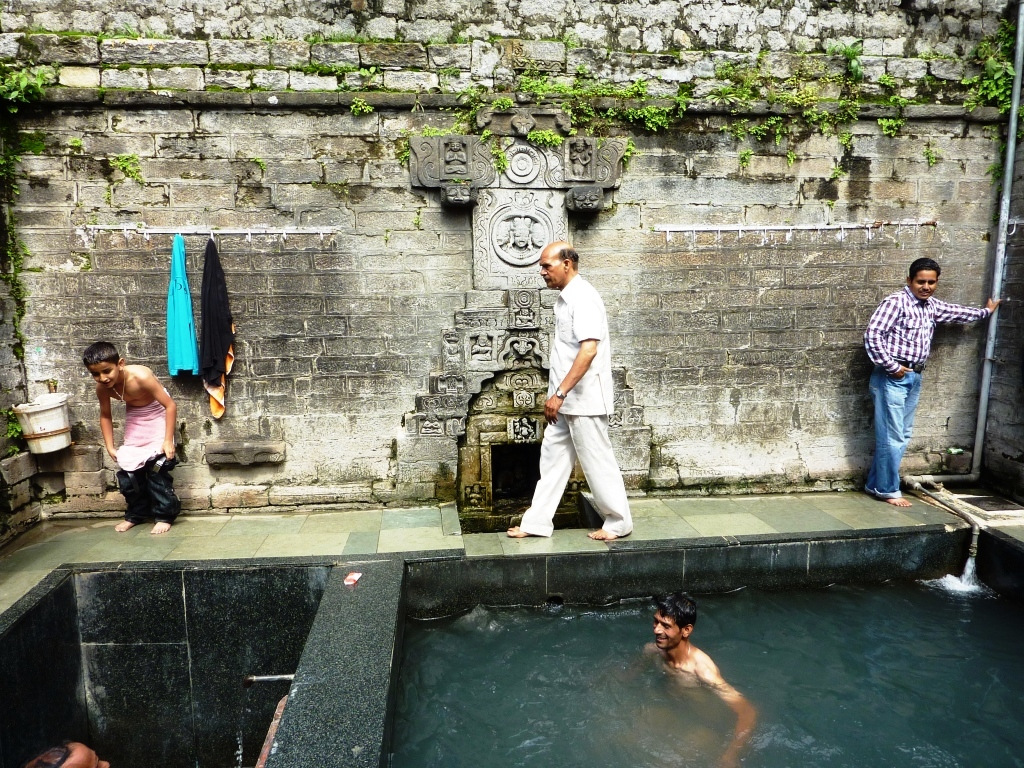
Hot springs near Manali, 2020

- Akhara Bazaar, Kullu
- Kasol, Kullu
- Kheerganga, Parvati Valley
- Manikaran hot springs, Kullu
- Tattapani, Karsog
- Vashisht, Kullu

==== Jammu & Kashmir ====
- Tatapani, Barmandal Kalakot Rajouri

==== Jharkhand ====
- Gandhaunia, near Mandu, Ramgarh district

==== Karnataka ====
- Bendru Theertha, Puttur

==== Ladakh ====
- Chumathang, Ladakh
- Hot Springs, Chang Chenmo Valley, Ladakh

==== Madhya Pradesh ====
- Babeha, Mandla-Jabalpur Road (now submerged under catchment water of Bargi Dam on river Narmada)
- Chavalpani, near Pachmarhi

==== Maharashtra ====
- Boisar Kokanee Hot Springs
- Ganeshpuri, Akloli, Vajreshwari
- Unapdev, and Sunapdeo
- Unhavare, Near Dapoli
- Unhere Kund, near Pali
- Unkeshwar hot spring, located at Unkeshwar Village in Kinwat Taluka, Dist. Nanded

==== Odisha ====
- Atri hot spring, Khordha, 42 km from Bhubaneshwar
- Deulajhari hot spring, Angul
- Taptapani, near Berhampur; Atri, near Bhubaneswar, on Tarabalo in Nayagarh District of Orissa

==== Sikkim ====
- Sikkim has many hot springs, including:
  - Borang
  - Phurchachu (Reshi)
  - Ralang
  - Taram-chu
  - Yumey Samdong
  - Yumthang

All these hot springs have a high sulfur content and are located near the river banks. The average temperature of the water in these hot springs is 50 °C (122 °F).

==== West Bengal ====
- Bakreshwar, Birbhum, West Bengal

=== Indonesia ===
==== Bali ====
- Banyuwedang (Gerokgak, Buleleng)
- Yeh Panes Panetahan (Tabanan Regency)

==== Java ====
- Cangar, Mount Arjuna, Malang
- Ciater, Subang, West Java
- Cipanas, Garut, West Java
- Cisolok, Pelabuhan Ratu, West Java
- Maribaya Hot Spring, Lembang
- Pacet, Mojokerto
- Pancuran Tujuh, Mount Slamet, Central Java
- Parang Wedang, Parangtritis

==== Lesser Sunda Islands ====
- Mengurada Hot Spring, Bajawa city, Flores

==== Maluku Islands ====
- Ambon Island, Maluku

==== Sumatra ====
- Danau Linting (Hot Spring Lake about 8000 m2 near tiga juhar village), Deli Serdang, North Sumatra
- Dolok Tinggi Raja white crater, Simalungun District, North Sumatra; dubbed mini Pamukkale or mini Yellowstone
- Gemuhak, Muara Anip Regency, South Sumatra
- Ie Seum (Aceh Language: Hot Water), near Port Malayahati Krueng Raya, Aceh Besar, Nanggroe Aceh Darussalam
- Sei Batang Serangan Hot Spring (at Ekowisata Tangkahan), Langkat, North Sumatra
- Sei Wampu Hot Spring (White Water Hot Spring at Wampu River near Marike Estate of PTPN II), Langkat, North Sumatra
- Hot Semurup, Air Hangat Subdistrict, Kerinci
- Sibayak Hot Spring (at Lau Debuk-Debuk Village), Karo District, North Sumatra
- Tarutung Hot Spring (many Hot Spring Like Hutabarat, Sipaholon), North Tapanuli, North Sumatra

=== Iran ===
- Ferdows Hot Spring
- Kousar Hot Spring
- Meshkin Shahr (Ghoutor Soee, Ilanjigh, Gheynarjeh, Shabil)
- Sar-Ein Hot Springs, more than 20 traditional and modern thermal springs
- Sardabeh Hot Spring

=== Israel ===
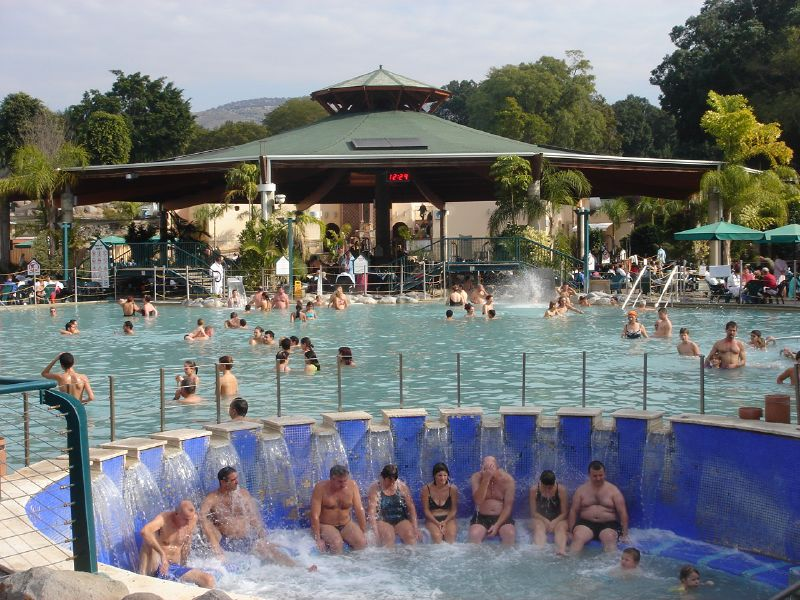
Hamat Gader

- Ein Gedi
- Hamat Gader
- Hamei Ga'ash
- Hamei Yoav
- Tiberias

=== Japan ===
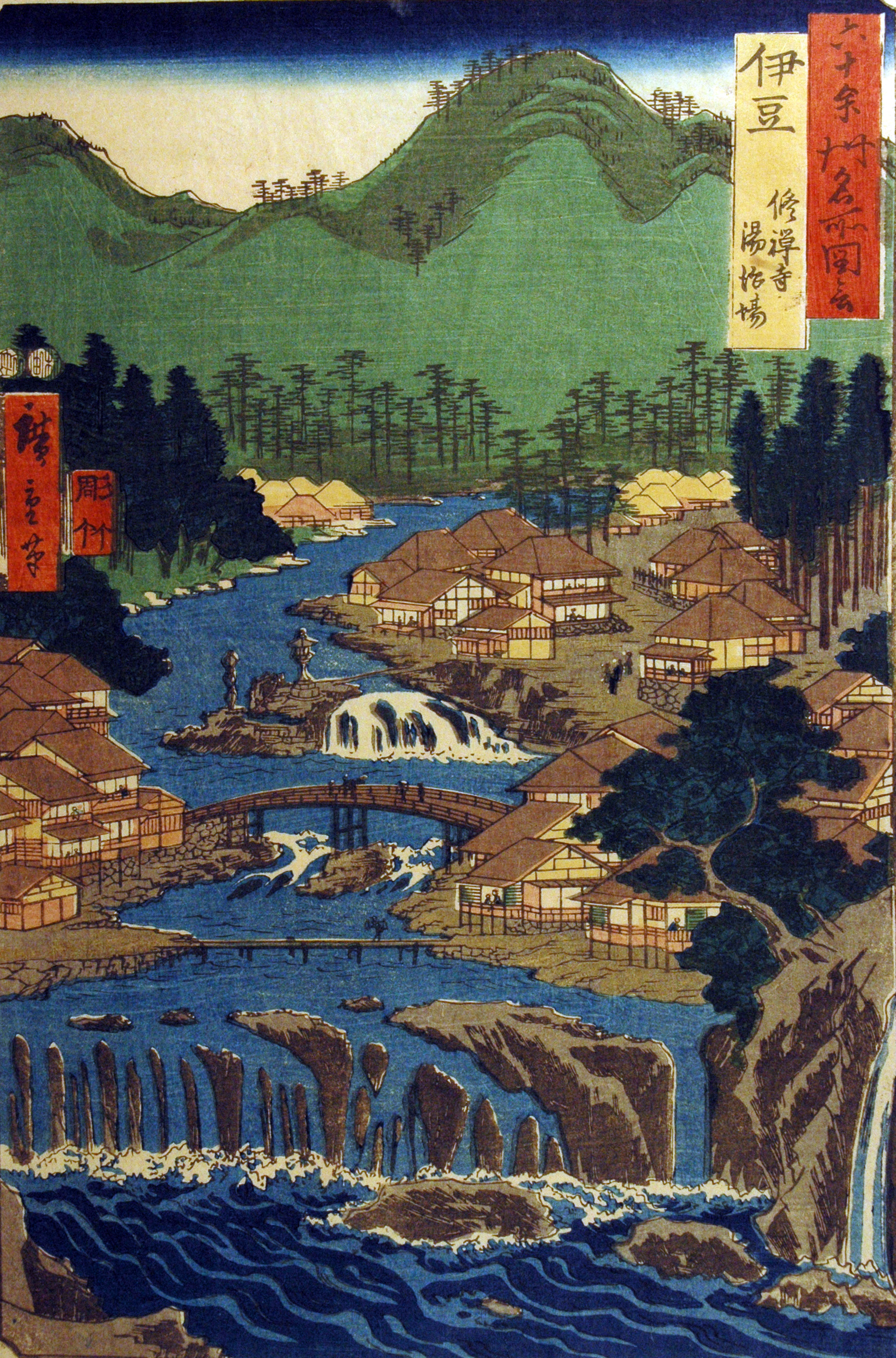
Izu Province, The Hot Springs of the Shuzen Temple woodcut by Utagawa Hiroshige

Being located in the "Pacific Ring of Fire", Japan is in a volcanic region, and is home to many hot springs. The onsen (a Japanese word for "hot spring") plays a notable role in Japanese culture.

In March 2003 it was reported that there were 3,102 spa resorts in 2,292 municipalities in Japan. There were also 15,400 lodging facilities with 6,740 public hot spring baths. About 138 million people a year visit these facilities.

Noted hot springs areas in Japan

- Arima Onsen, Hyogo
- Atami, Shizuoka
- Beppu, Oita see Hells of Beppu and Beppu Onsen
- Gero, Gifu, Gifu
- Hakone, Kanagawa see also Ōwakudani
- Ikaho, Gumma, also known as Ikaho Onsen, Kogane-no-Yu (The Golden Waters), Kodakara-no-Yu (Child Waters)
- Kinugawa, Tochigi Kinugawa Onsen
- Kirishima, Kagoshima
- Kusatsu, Gunma
- Noboribetsu, Hokkaido Jigokudani, or Hell Valley, the main source of the Noboribetsu onsen
- Nyuto, Akita
- Shibu, Nagano
- Shirahama, Wakayama see Nanki-Shirahama Onsen and Tsubaki Onsen
- Shuzenji Onsen
- Toyako, Shikotsu-Toya National Park, Hokkaido
- Unzen Onsen
- Yunomine Onsen, Tanabe, Wakayama, site of the UNESCO World Heritage Tsuboyu bath
- Yufuin, Oita

Disputed territory between Japan and Russia:

- Iturup Baransky volcano Hot Springs

=== Jordan ===
- Ma'in Hot Springs, near Madaba

=== South Korea ===
- Heosimcheong Spa, Busan
- Yusong Foot Spa, near Daejon

=== Kyrgyzstan ===
- Issyk-kul
- Jeti-Ögüz resort

=== Laos ===
- Meuang Hiam Hot Springs

=== Malaysia ===
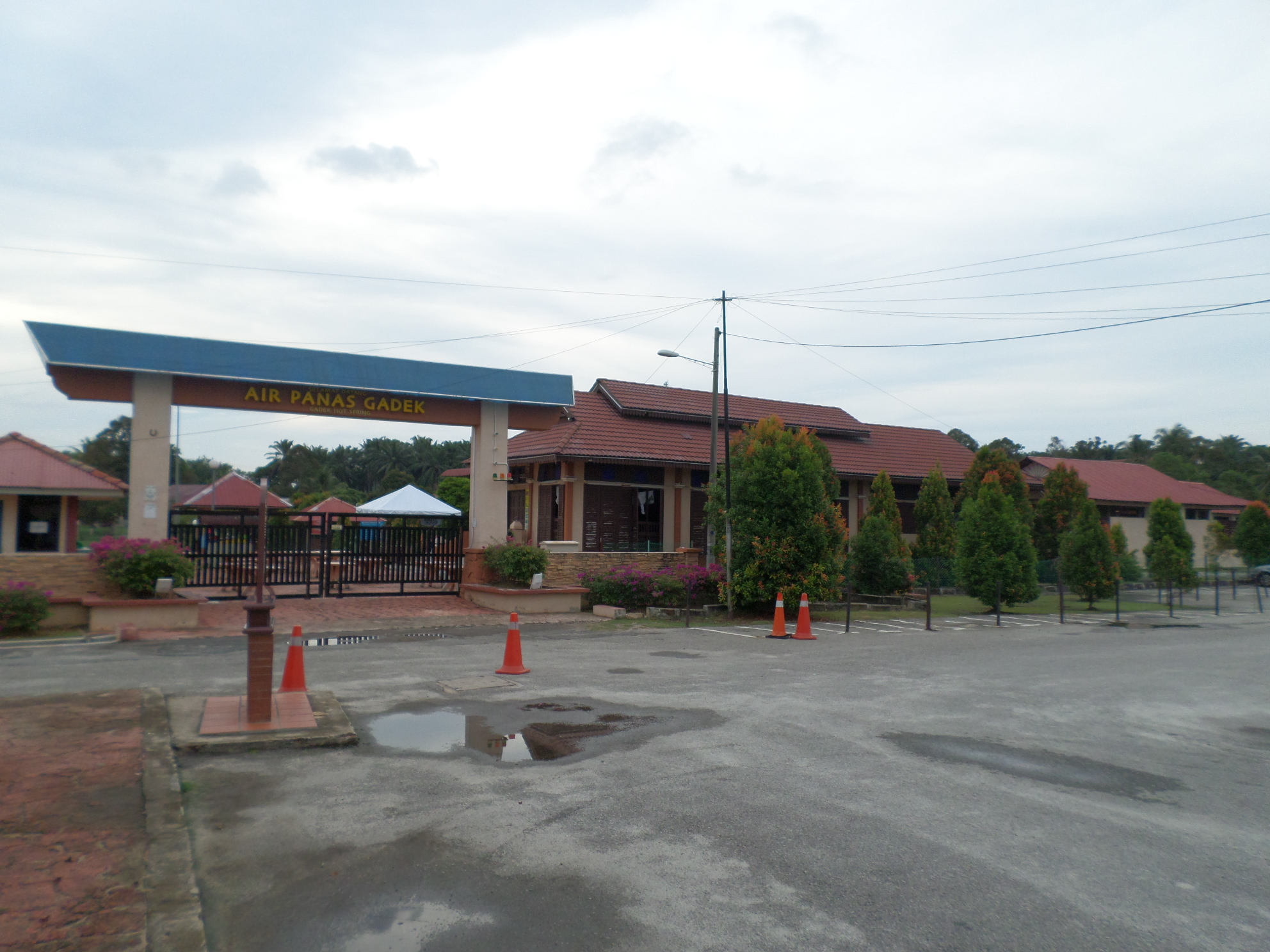
Gadek Hot Spring in Malacca

Various hot springs, all nonvolcanic. They include the following.

==== Johor ====
- Grisek, 10 km from Parit Jawa, Muar district
- Labis

==== Kedah ====
- Air hangat, Langkawi

==== Malacca ====
- Gadek Hot Spring
- Jasin Hot Spring

==== Negeri Sembilan ====
- Chengkau Hot Spring
- Pedas Hot Spring

==== Pahang ====
- Bentong
- Gunung Tapis, Sungai Lembing

==== Perak ====
- Ayer Panas, Grik
- Kampung Ulu Slim (Slim River)
- Lost World of Tambun - Hot Springs & Spa
- Mangong, Kuala Kangsar
- Pengkalan Hulu
- Sg Klah, developed commercially

==== Sabah ====
- Poring hot springs, Kinabalu National Park

==== Sarawak ====
- Annah Rais Hotspring, Padawan
- Kampung Panchor Dayak Hotspring, Padawan
- Paku Hotspring, Bau
- Merarap Hotspring Lodge, Lawas

==== Selangor ====
- Kalumpang, south of Tanjung Malim, north of Kerling
- Kerling, near Batang Kali
- Selayang, 15 km north of Kuala Lumpur
- Ulu Tamu, near Tanjung Malim

==== Terengganu ====
- LA hot spring, Besut

=== Nepal ===
- Bhulbhule Khar, Tanahu district
- Bhurung, Do Khola, Singha, Chhumrung and Dhadkharka, Myagdi district
- Chame and La Ta, Manang district
- Dhanachauri (Luma) and Tila river, Jumla
- Hotiyana, Sankhuwasabha, Koshi zone, eastern Nepal
- Jomsom and Dhima, Mustang
- Riar, Saghu Khola, Sarai Khola, middle development region of Nepal
- Srikaar, Sina and Chamlaiya, Darchula
- Syabrubesi and Chilime, Rasuwa, north of Kathmandu
- Tapoban, Bajhang district

=== Oman ===
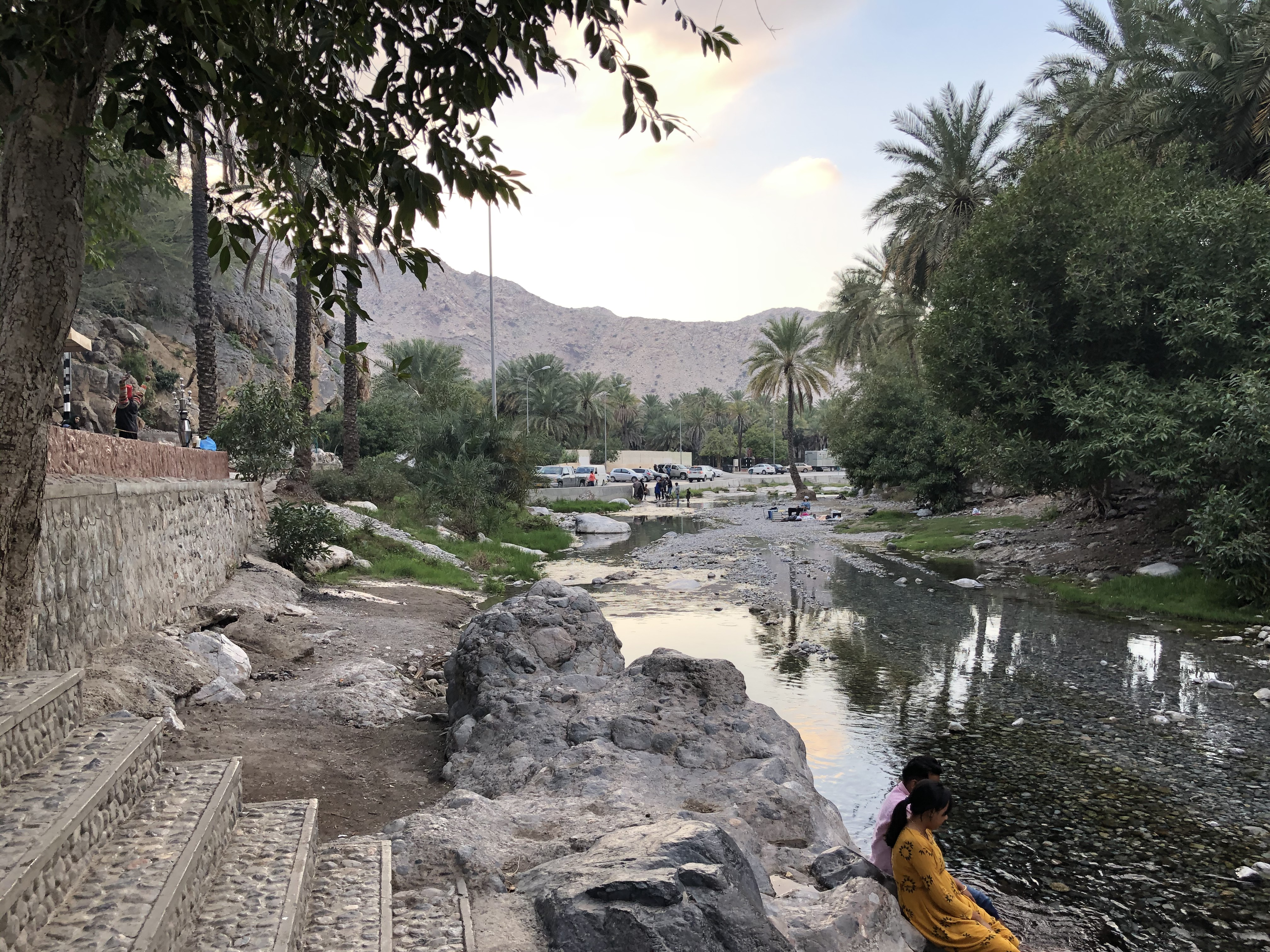
Athawarah Hot Spring

- Athawarah Hot Spring

=== Pakistan ===
- Garam Chashma, Lower Chitral
- Thandiani, Abbottabad
- Tatta Pani, Azad Kashmir
- Chitral-Gobore, Pech uch and Yurjogh
- Mandi Nara
- Nara Matora Kahuta

=== Philippines ===
- Mainit Hot Spring
- Mambukal Mountain Resort, hot soda and sulfur springs slightly above 30 °C
- Puning Hot Spring, in Sitio Puning, Barangay Inararo, Municipality of Porac, Pampanga Province; accessed through Sitio Target, Barangay Sapang Bato, Angeles City

=== Singapore ===
- Pulau Tekong
- Sembawang Hot Spring Park

=== Sri Lanka ===
About 10 thermal springs have been identified in Sri Lanka.

- Embilinne
- Kanniya hot water spring
- Kapurella
- Kivulegama
- Maha-oya
- Maha-pelessa
- Marangala
- Mutugalwela
- Nelumwewa/Galwewa
- Rankihiriya

=== Taiwan ===
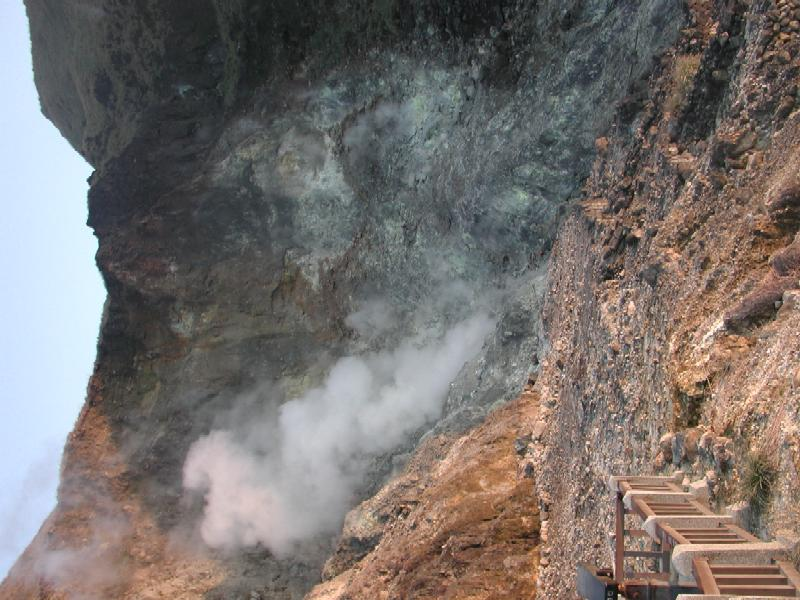
Yangmingshan hot springs in Taiwan

- Beitou
- Chiao Hsi
- Dakeng
- Green island, undersea spas
- Guanziling Hot Spring
- Guguan
- Jhiben Hot Spring
- Jiaoxi
- Ruisui, Hualien
- Sichongxi Hot Spring
- Tai-an Hot Spring
- Wulai
- Yangmingshan
- Zhaori Hot Spring

=== Tajikistan ===
- Gharm-Chashma

=== Thailand ===
- Ban Huay Zai Kao Hot Spring
- Ban Pong Krathing Hot Spring (Ban Bueng Hot Spring)
- Bo Khloung Hot Stream
- Jae Son hot spring
- Khlong Thom hot stream (hot spring)
- Muang Paeng hot spring
- Pa Bong hot spring
- Pong Krathing Hot Spring
- Rung Arun hot spring
- Thai Prachan Hot Spring
- Wieng Pa Pao hot spring
- Krabi hot spring (Nuae Khlong)

=== Tibet Autonomous Region ===
- Yangbajing hot springs

=== Timor-Leste ===
- Marobo Hot Springs, Bobonaro Municipality

=== Vietnam ===
There are over 280 hot springs in Vietnam.

- Bang Spa, Quảng Bình Province
- Bình Châu, Bà Rịa–Vũng Tàu province
- Kim Boi, Hòa Bình Province
- Nha Trang

=== Yemen ===
- Al-Sukhna Natural Springs

== Europe ==
=== Albania ===
- Banjat e Bënjës, near Petran

=== Belgium ===
- Chaudfontaine

=== Bulgaria ===
- Bedenski bani
- Hissarya
- Kyustendil
- Narechen
- Pavel Banya
- Pomorie
- Sandanski
- Sapareva Banya
- Sofia (Bankya), in and around
- Velingrad

=== Czech Republic ===
- Karlovy Vary
- Teplice
- Teplice nad Bečvou
- Velké Losiny

=== Georgia ===
- Tbilisi, Sulphur Baths

=== Germany ===
- Aachen, 74 degrees C, 165 degrees F
- Bad Oeynhausen, 36 degrees C, 97 degrees F, with a depth of 725 m and 3000 L/min, largest carbonated brine water source in the world
- Wiesbaden, 66 degrees C, 151 degrees F

=== Greece ===
Spring	Region	Temperature °C max. (min.)	Type of mineral spring	Alleged therapeutic properties
Agiasmata spring	Chios	57.5		Endocrine and musculoskeletal system, degenerative arthritis, rheumatisms, spondyloarthritis, lumbago, sciatica, ankylosis, gynecological ailments, vasculopathies, tendonitis etc.
Agios Fokas	Kos	46 (45)		Balneotherapy for ailments of the musculoskeletal and integumentary system
Agistro	Serres	39 (34)		Hydrotherapy for rheumatism
Apollonas Thermon Saline Spring	Ikaria	47.8	Radioactive	
Asclepius Saline Spring	Ikaria	40	Radioactive super warm spring	
Edipsos	Evia	80 (57)	Saline water spring	Chronic rheumatisms, degenerative arthritis, spondyloarthritis, neuritis, sciatica, lumbago, post trauma ankylosis and deformations, gynecological ailments
Eftalou	Lesvos	46 (43)		Hydrotherapy for chronic rheumatisms, arthritis, sciatica, lumbago, neuralgia, lymphatism, kidney grains, cholelithiasis, gynecological ailments, chest ailments, myositis, chronic degenerative arthritis, injuries, post surgery phase for hemorrhoids, paradontopathia, leucorrhea, skin ailments
Eleftheron thermal spa	Kavala		Alkaline saline water spring	
Genisaia (Potamia)	Xanthi	70 (55)		Chronic rheumatisms, gynecological ailments, neuralgia, neuritis, allergic skin ailments
Kaiafas	Ilia	33.5 (32)	H_{2}S saline water spring	Rheumatisms, autoimmune ailments, rheumatoid arthritis, osteoarthritis of the hip and knee, fibromyalgia, skin ailments The spa facility in Kaiafas
Kalymnos	Kalymnos	38.1		Arthritis, rheumatisms, sciatica, lumbago
Kamena Vourla	Fthiotida	42 (30)	Radioactive saline water spring	Balneotherapy for ailments of the musculoskeletal and integumentary system
Kimolos	Kimolos	46		
Kolpou Geras	Lesvos	39.7		Rheumatisms, arthritis, neurological ailments, chronic injuries
Kyllini	Ilia		H_{2}S saline water	
Kythnos	Kyklades	38–52	Chalybeate acid water spring	Chronic and subacute rheumatisms, gynecological ailments, arthritis, neuralgia, skin ailments, cervical syndrome, lumbago- sciatica etc. syndromes, chronic gout Agioi Anargyroi saline spring: 38 °C; Kakavos ferrous spring:52 °C
Lagadas	Thessaloniki	39	Akratothermi	Balneotherapy for rheumatism, arthritis, gynecological disorders, skin diseases, kidney diseases
Lakkos Adamanta	Kyklades (Milos)	38		Chronic rheumatisms, arthritis, gynecological ailments, neuralgia, neuritis
Lefkada's Thermo Saline Spring	Ikaria	58		
Loutraki	Korinthia	30	Slightly warm – saline water, hypotonic	Hydrotherapy for chronic rheumatisms, chronic rheumatoid arthritis, spondylarthrite, sciatica, infections of the skin, allergic skin ailments, psoriasis, eczema
Mandraki	Nisyros	48		Rheumatisms, arthritis, gynecological ailments, ailments of the circulatory system
Methana	Attiki		Sulphurous brine water spring, warm	
Nea Apollonia	Thessaloniki	57 (38)		Balneotherapy for rheumatism, arthritis, peripheral nerve disorders, gynecological disorders, fractures, sprains
Nigrita's Thermes	Serres	56 (25)	Alkaline carbonated water spring	Balneotherapy for arthritis, rheumatisms, skin ailments, gynecological ailments. Mineral water drinking therapy for ailments of the gastrointestinal system.
Palia Kameni hot springs	Kyklades (Santorini)			
Paranesti Thermia	Drama	54		
Platystomo	Fthiotida	32	Alkaline sulphurous spring	Hydrotherapy for rheumatisms, arthritis, skin ailments, gynecological ailments
Polichnitos	Lesvos	92 (67)		Rheumatisms, arthritis, sciatica, gynecological ailments, neuritis, skin ailments
Pozar Spa	Pella	37		Balneotherapy for rheumatism, arthritis, peripheral nerve disorders, gynecological and skin diseases, sprains, fractures
Psarotherma	Samothraki	100		Rheumatoid arthritis, chronic rheumatisms, gynecological ailments, peripheral vasculopathies, secondary skin ailments, obesity
Sedes	Thessaloniki	38 (32)		Rheumatisms, arthritis, ailments of the peripheral nerves, skin ailments, post trauma conditions, gynecological ailments
Sidirokastro	Serres	55 (43.7)		Rheumatisms, spondylitis, spilled disc, neuralgia, myalgia, sciatica, joint ailments, gynecological ailments
Smokovo	Karditsa	42	Alkaline sulphurous spring	Chronic rheumatisms, arthritis, ailments of the respiratory system, ailments of the digestive system, skin ailments, endocrine failures, gynecological ailments
Spilaio Ikarias	Ikaria	54		
Therma Lemnou	Lemnos	43 (39)		Hydrotherapy for rheumatisms, arthropathy, arthritis, osteoporosis, spondyloarthritis, kidney stones, cholelithiasis
Thermopylae spring	Fthiotida	40	H_{2}S saline water spring, warm	Rheumatisms, gynecological ailments and ailments of the peripheral nerves
Traianoupoli	Evros	52 (51)		Balneotherapy for ailments of the integumentary system and the musculoskeletal system, as well as for rheumatisms and autoimmune diseases
Vouliagmeni	Attiki		Saline water spring, hypertonic	
Ypati Baths	Fthiotida	32	H_{2}S saline water spring	Ailments and syndromes of the vessels, arterial hypertension, ailments of the heart and the skin, chronic ailments of the nervous system

=== Hungary ===
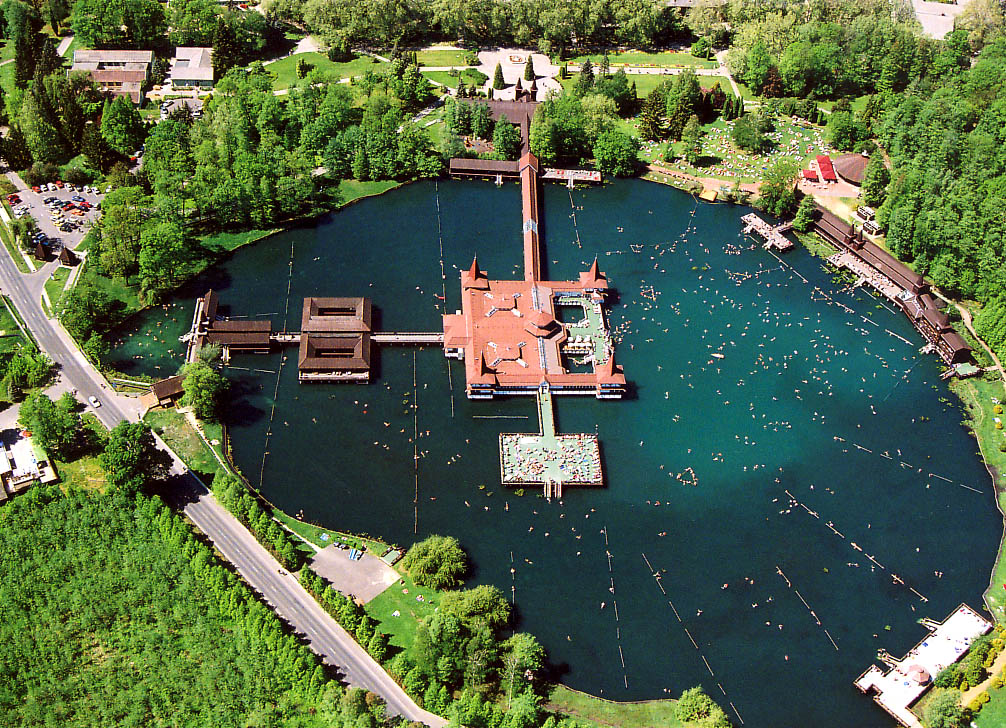
Lake Hévíz

- Bogács
- Budapest, Rudas
- Budapest, Széchenyi
- Bükfürdő
- Bükkszék
- Csisztapuszta
- Csokonyavisonta
- Egerszalók
- Hajdúszoboszló
- Harkány
- Igal
- Jászárokszállás
- Lake Hévíz is the largest thermal lake in Europe. It is close to the city of Hévíz, Hungary. The lake water temperatures range between 23 and 25 °C in winter and 33–36 °C in summer.
- Mezőkövesd
- Miskolctapolca
- Sárvár
- Zalakaros

=== Iceland ===
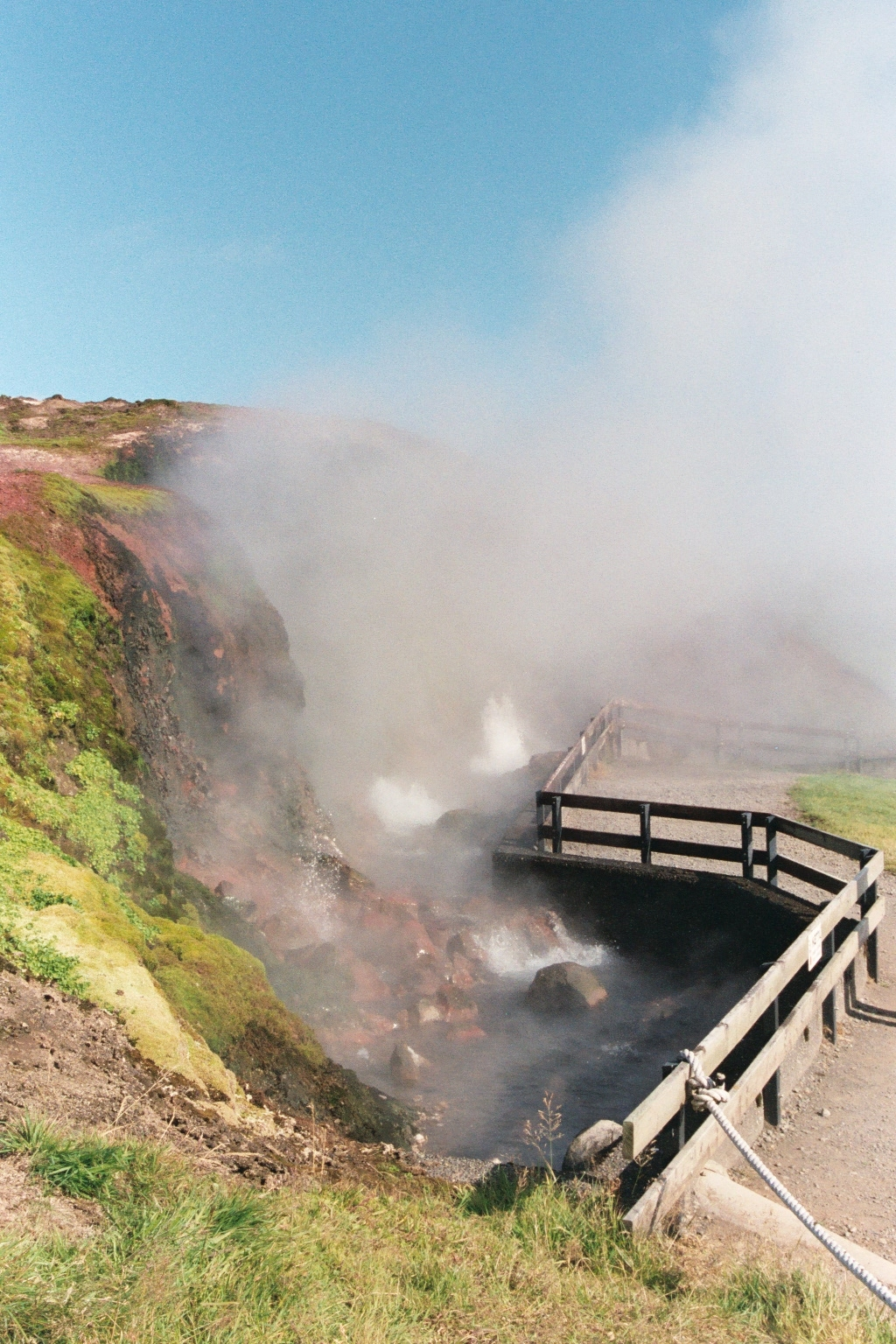
Deildartunguhver, Iceland: the highest flow hot spring in Europe

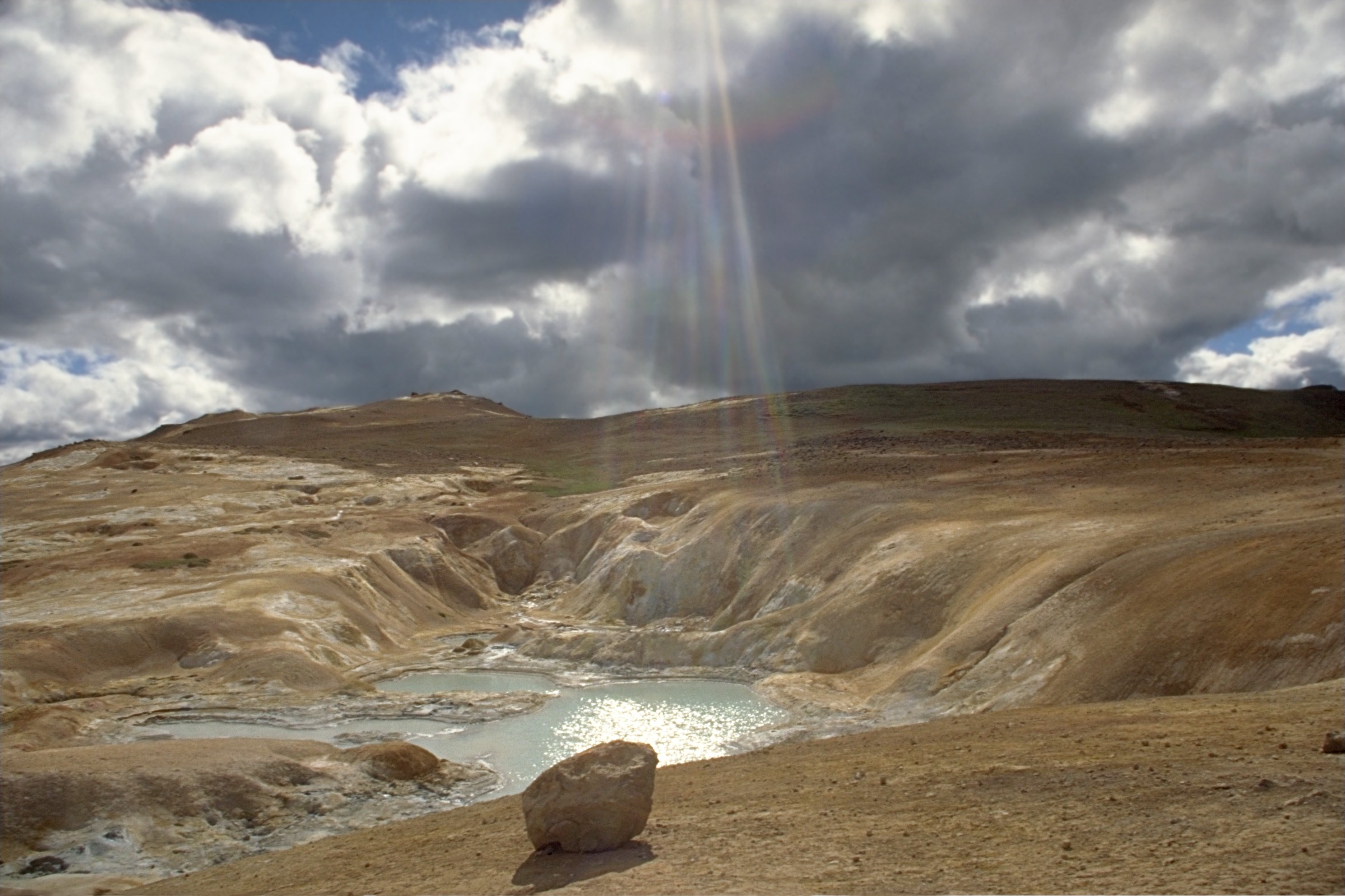
Hot spring at volcano Leirhnjukur, Iceland

- Blue Lagoon, Grindavík, 36 °C
- Deildartunguhver 97 °C
- Geysir hot springs
- Grjótagjá
- Gunnuhver hot springs
- Guðrúnarlaug hot spring
- Hellulaug
- Hrunalaug (Hruni hot springs)
- Hveragarðurinn
- Hveravellir
- Hverir
- Kualaug hot spring
- Mývatn Nature Baths
- Pollurinn hot springs
- Reykjadalur Hot Spring Thermal River
- Seltún Hot Springs
- Sky Lagoon

=== Italy ===
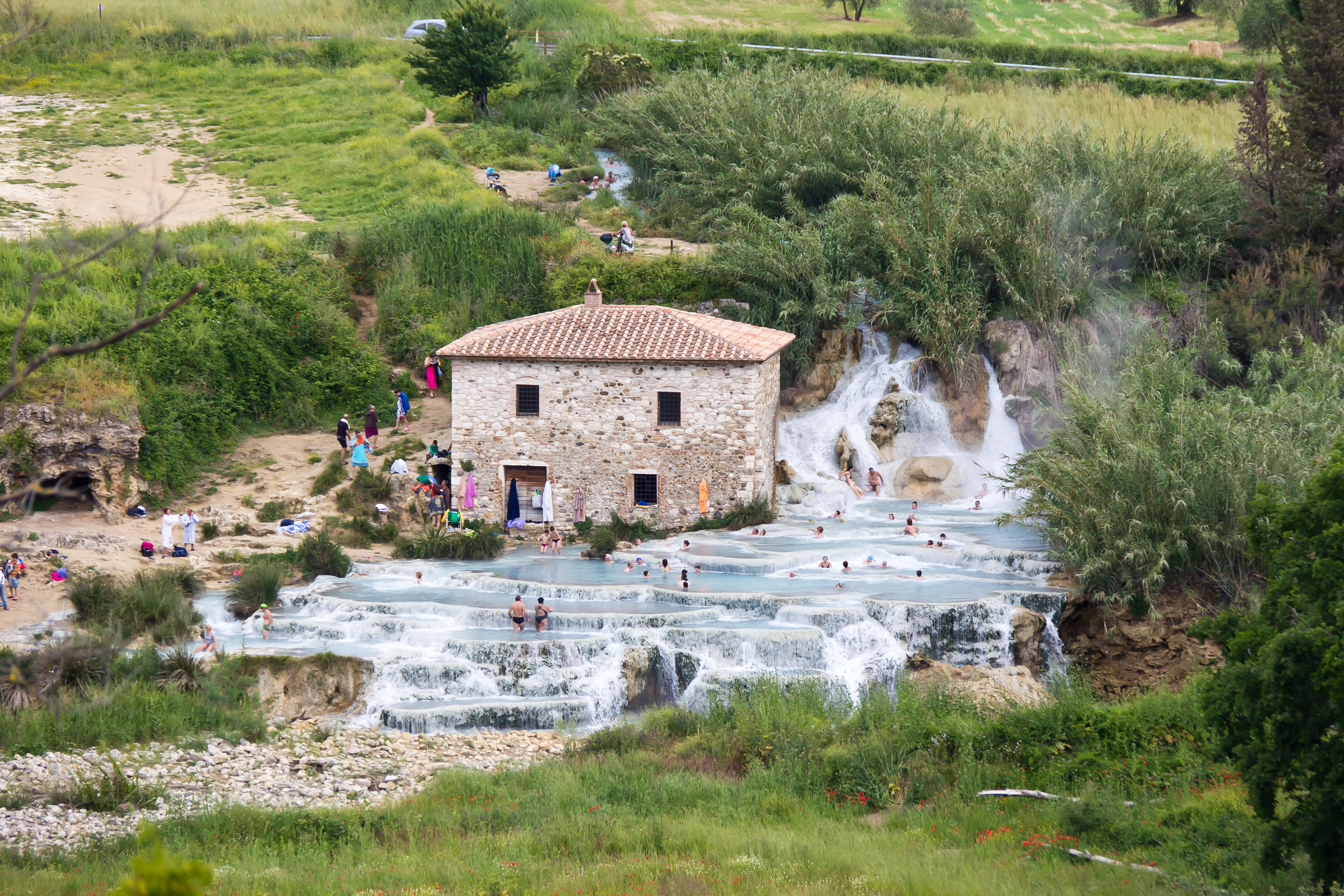
Hot springs of Saturnia, Waterfall Mulino, Tuscany

- Abano Terme, Veneto, 130 hot springs
- Aeolian Islands, Sicily, hot springs
- Arta Terme, Friuli Venezia Giulia, sulphurous springs
- Bagni di Craveggia, Valle Onsernone, hot springs, 28 degrees C
- Bagni di Lucca, Tuscany, thermal springs
- Bagni San Filippo, near Monte Amiata, Tuscany
- Bagni di Tivoli, Lazio, sulphurous springs
- Bagno Vignoni, near Val d'Orcia, Tuscany
- Baiae, ancient Roman volcanic hot springs town on the shore of the Gulf of Naples, now partially submerged
- Bormio, Sondrio Province, Lombardy (geothermal spa), 36–43 degrees C
- Brisighella, Emilia Romagna, sulphorus waters
- Caramanico Terme, Abruzzi, two springs
- Chianciano Terme, Tuscany
- Ischia, Campania, volcanic heat source
- Islands Sciacca, Sicily, sulphurous waters
- Monsummano, Grotta Parlanti and Grotta Giusti, Northern Tuscany
- Montecatini Terme, Tuscany, thermal springs
- Montegrotto Terme, Veneto
- Petriolo, Tuscany
- Piemonte Acqui Terme, Piedmont, sulphurous spring
- Rapolano Terme, Tuscany
- San Casciano dei Bagni, Tuscany
- San Giuliano Terme, Pisa, Tuscany, thermal springs
- Santa Cesarea Terme, Lecce Province, Apulia Region, coastal thermal spring along the Adriatic Sea
- Sassetta, Tuscan coastal area
- Saturnia (Terme di Saturnia), southern Tuscany, 37 degrees Celsius pouring out at 800 litres per second into terraced pools that are free to dip in day or night
- Spezzano Albanese, Cosenza, Calabria
- Tabiano Terme, Lombardy, sulphurous springs
- Termini Imerese, Sicily, sulphur springs
- Uliveto Terme, Pisa, Tuscany, thermal springs
- Venturina Terme , Tuscan coastal area
- Viterbo, Lazio, sulphurous springs

=== North Macedonia ===
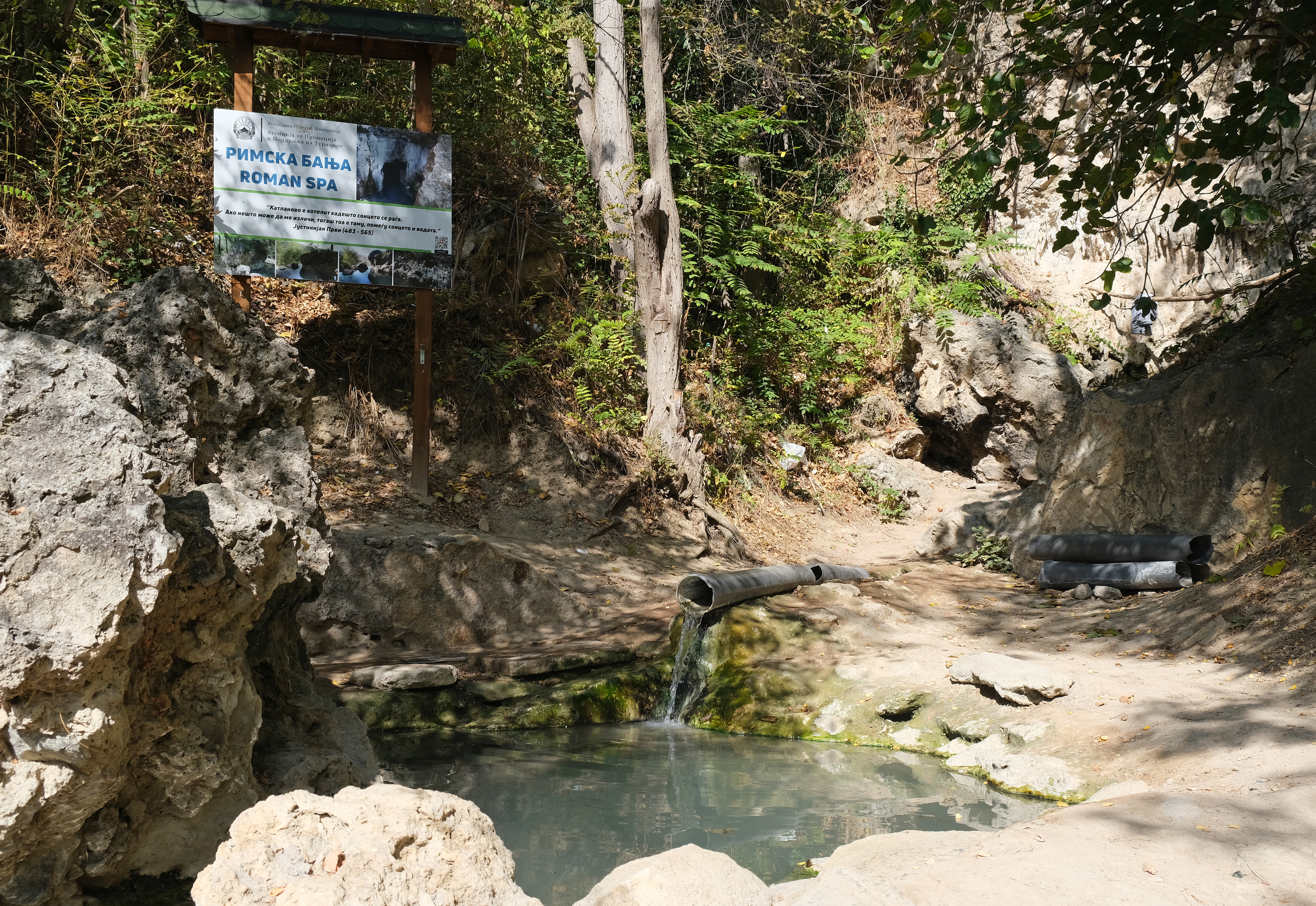
Katlanovo hot springs

- Banja Banishte
- Banja Bansko
- Banja Car Samoil
- Banja Kežovica
- Banja Kochani
- Banja Strnovec
- Debarski Banji
- Katlanovska Banja
- Kumanovska Banja
- Negorski Banji

=== Norway ===
- Northwest Spitsbergen National Park, Spitsbergen at 80°N, contains two of Earth's most northerly hot springs, including Troll Hot Springs and Jotun Hot Springs.

=== Portugal ===
Hot springs in Portuguese are Caldas

Azores

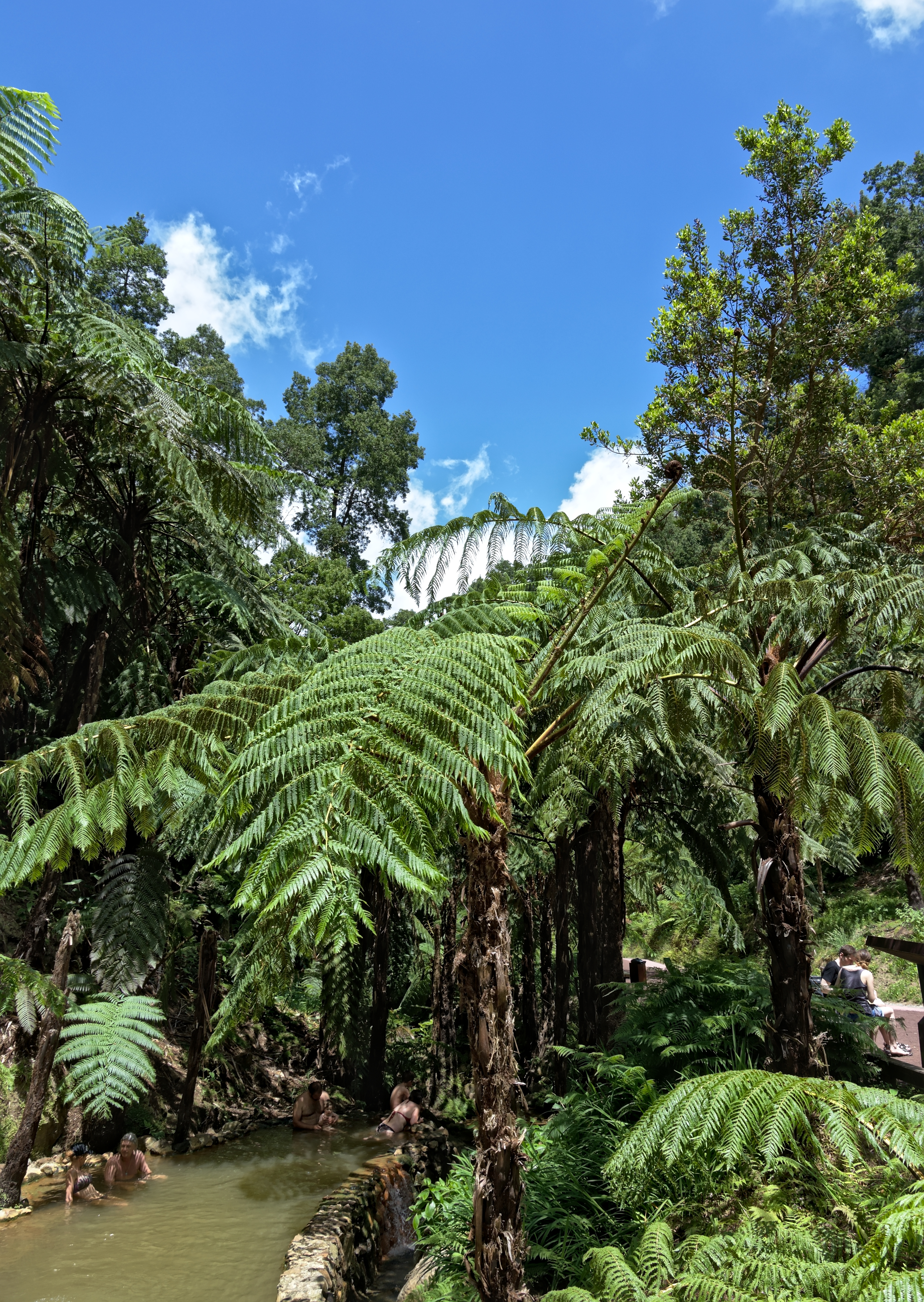
Hot springs, Azores

- Monumento Natural da Caldeira Velha, Azores
- Parque Terra Nostra, Azores
- Poça Dona Beija, Azores
- Ponta da Ferraria, Azores, ocean hot springs
- São Miguel Island hot springs, Azores
  - Caldeira das Furnas, high sulphur content with characteristic sulphuric scent, Azores
  - Caldeira Velha, near Lagoa do Fogo nature park with two thermal springs, Azores
  - Poca da Dona Beija, 82 °F to 102 °F, Azores
  - Ponta da Ferraria, hot springs cove with underwater hydrothermal vents at the ocean front, Azores
  - Terra Nostra Park, 95 to 113 °F, soaking pool built in 1700s, Azores

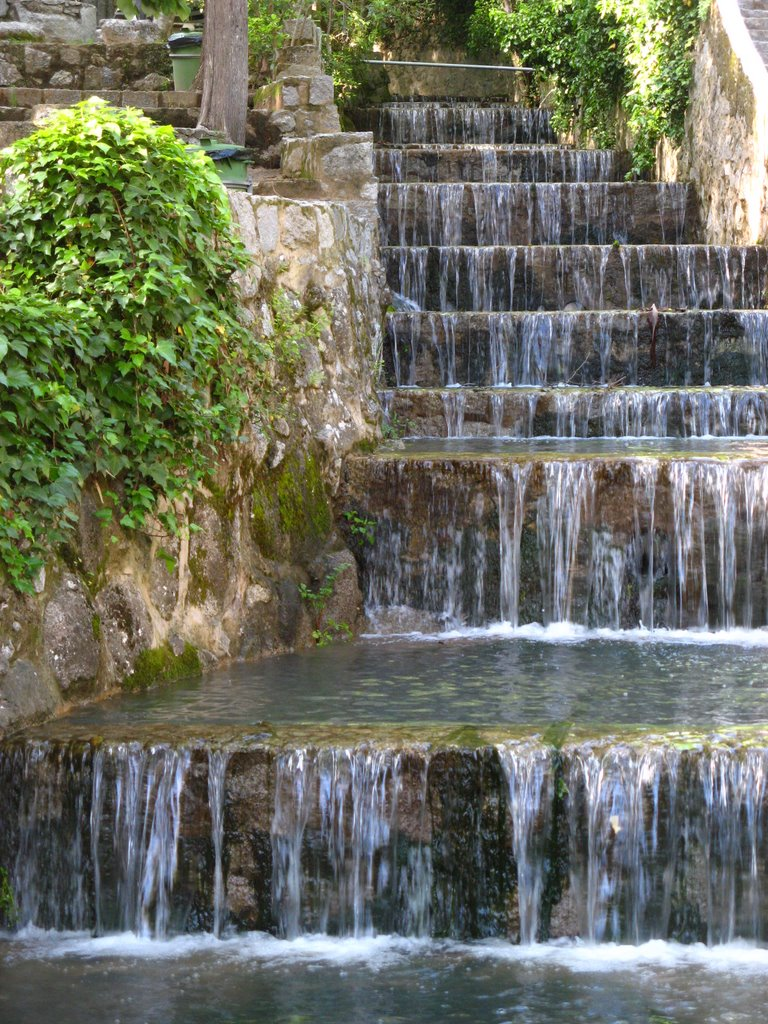
Waterfall in Caldas de Monchique

Continental Portugal

- Caldas de Vizela, Braga District
- Caldas da Rainha ("Queen's Hot Springs"), founded in the 15th century by Queen Dona Leonor, established as hospital at the site of therapeutic hot springs
- Caldas das Taipas
- Caldas de Moledo
- Caldas de Monchique, since Roman times
- Termas do Gerês
- Chaves, since Roman times with temperatures reaching 73 °C, mineral springs (bicarbonates, sodium, silicates and fluoride)
- São Pedro do Sul
- Caldas da Felgueira located in Viseu District, and 5 km from Nelas
- Termas de Monfortinho
- Caldas de São Jorge

=== Romania ===
- Băile Felix, 20–48 degrees C
- Băile Herculane, 30–80 degrees C
- Hârșova, 30–40 degrees C
- Sânmihaiu Român, 66 degrees C
- Siriu Hot Spring at Băile Siriu, 30–60 degrees C, under water (Siriu Lake) most of the year

=== Russia ===
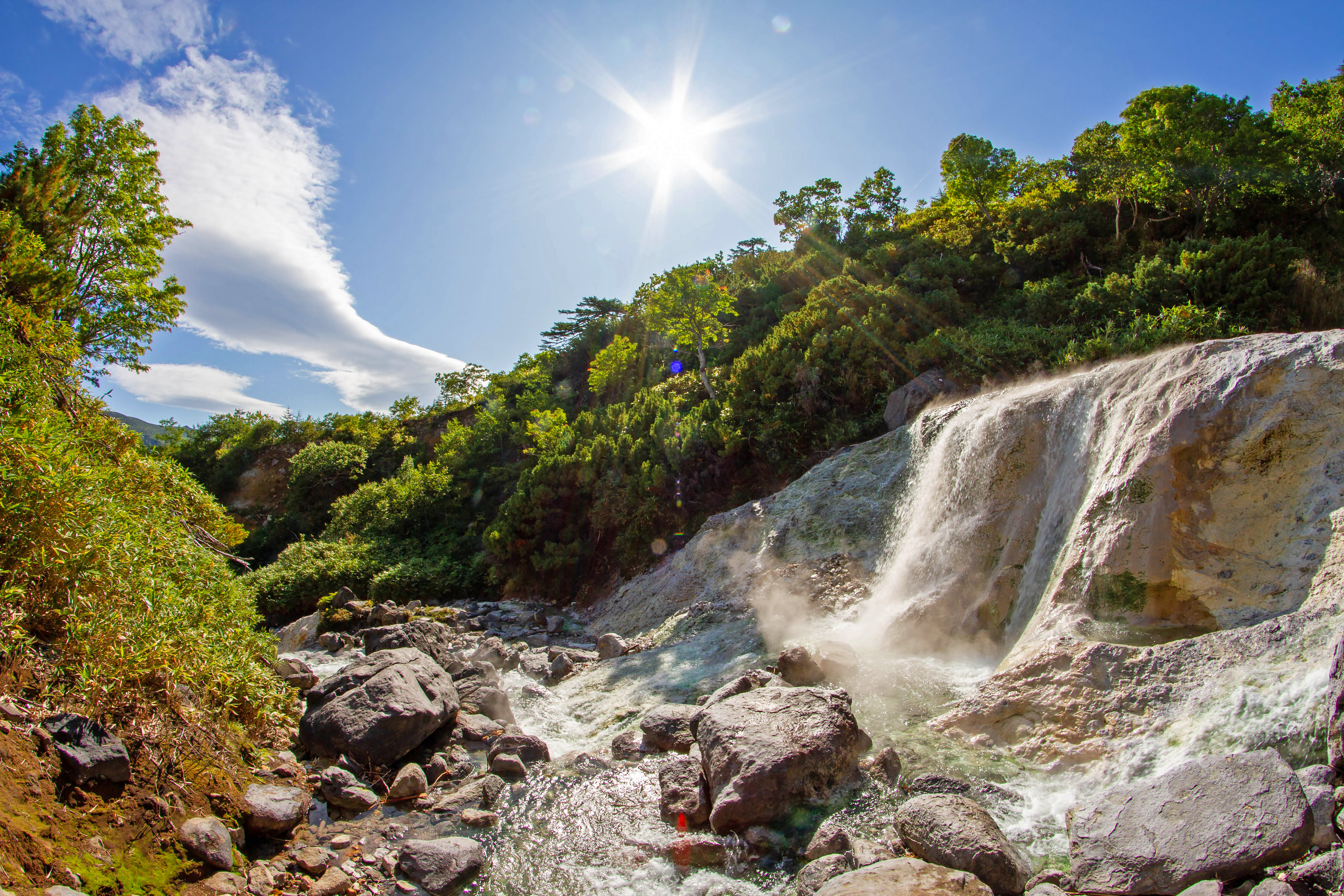
Iturup Baransky volcano Hot Springs

- Iturup Baransky Volcano Hot Springs (disputed territory between Russia and Japan)
- Malka, Kamchatka Krai, up to 84 °C (183 °F)
- Yessentuki, 35.5–46 °C (95.9–114.8 °F)

=== Serbia ===
- Jošanička Banja, 78 °C, the second hottest spring in Serbia
- Kuršumlijska banja, 58 °C
- Lukovska banja, 56 °C, located at an altitude of 700 m
- Mataruška banja, 38–40 °C
- Niška banja, 39 °C
- Sijarinska Banja, 18 different springs with temperatures between 16 and 71 °C and a natural 8-meter-tall (26 ft) geyser around an artificial pool
- Vranjska Banja, 96 degrees C (205 degrees F), in the depth up to 111 degrees C (232 degrees F), the world's hottest spring

=== Slovakia ===
123 hot springs with temperature above 25 degrees C (77 degrees F)

- Číž – spring BČ 3, 32 degrees C (89 degrees F)
- Dudince, 28 degrees C (82 degrees F)
- Liptovský Ján – 14 springs, 15 – 29 degrees C (59 – 85 degrees F)
- Sklené Teplice, several hot springs, 28 – 53 degrees C (82 – 127 degrees F)
- Spa Bešeňová

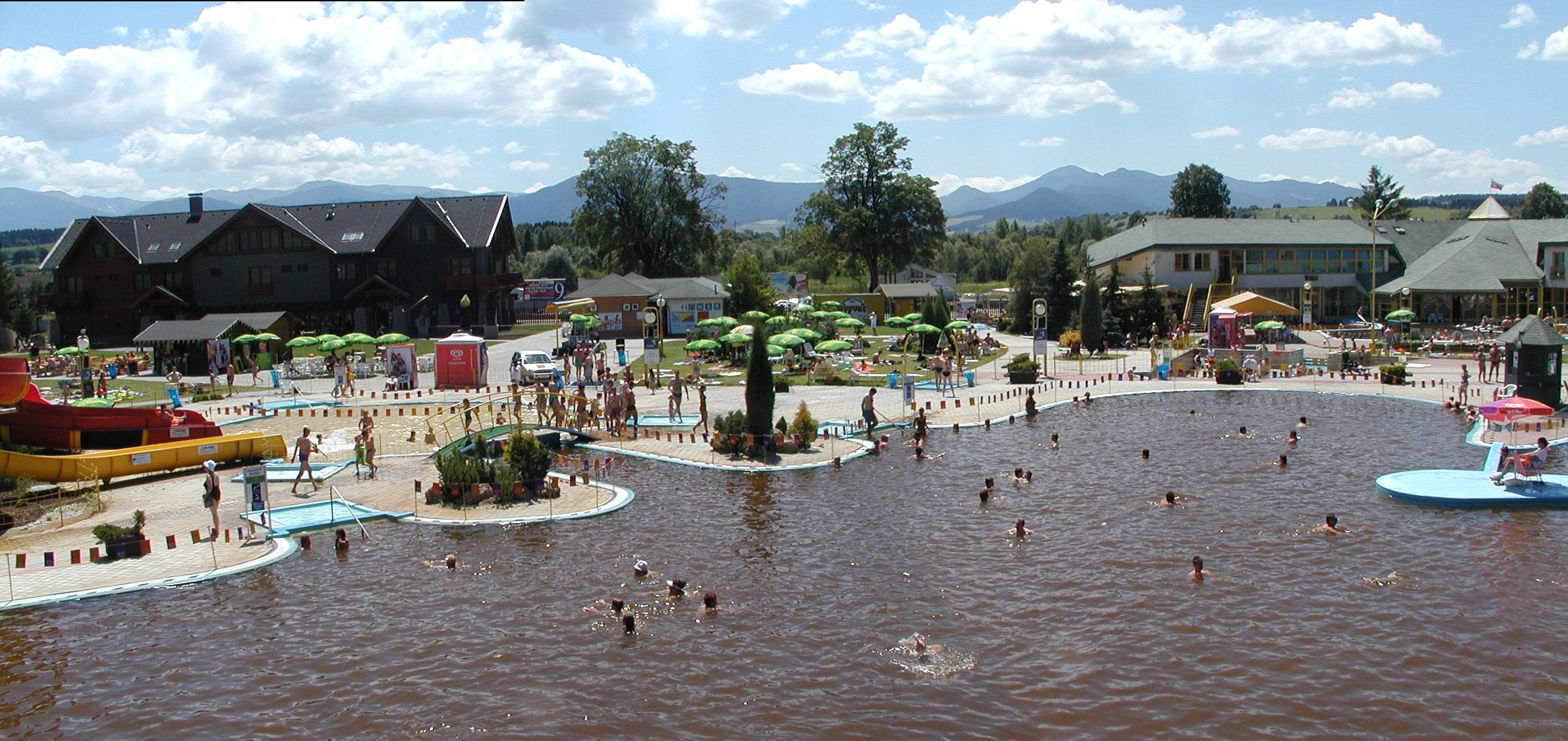
Thermal water park in Bešeňová, Slovakia

- Spa Bojnice, 9 springs, up to 52 degrees C (126 degrees F)
- Spa Kováčová, 49 degrees C (120 degrees F)
- Spa Lúčky, 32 degrees C (88 degrees F)
- Spa Piešťany, 67 – 69 degrees C (153 – 156 degrees F)
- Spa Rajecké Teplice, 38 degrees C (100 degrees F)
- Spa Sliač, several springs, up to 33 degrees C (92 degrees F)
- Spa Trenčianske Teplice, several hot springs, up to 40 degrees C (104 degrees F)
- Spa Turčianske Teplice, several hot springs, up to 47 degrees C (116 degrees F)
- Spa Vyšné Ružbachy, several springs, up to 22 degrees C (72 degrees F)
- Veľký Meder, 94 degrees C (201 degrees F), the hottest spring in Slovakia

=== Spain ===
- Alhama de Almería, Andalusia
- Alhama de Granada, Andalusia
- Caldes de Malavella, Girona, Catalonia
- Caldes de Montbui, Barcelona, Catalonia
- Caldas de Reis, Galicia
- Fuente Santa, La Palma, Canarias
- La Hermida, Cantabria
- Ourense, Galicia
- Panticosa, Huesca
- Torneiros, Galicia

=== Turkey ===
- Afyonkarahisar (Gazlıgöl, Heybeli, Ömer, Hüdai, Gecek)
- Aksaray (Ihlara Valley, Ziga)
- Amasya (Terziköy, Hamamözü, Gözlek)
- Ankara (Ayaş, Beypazarı, Dutlu, Kapullu, Haymana, Kızılcahamam)
- Aydın (Alangüllü, Germencik, İmamköy Kızıldere, Kuşadası)
- Ağrı (Didaydın)
- Balıkesir (Balya, Bigadiç, Edremit, Ferman, Güre, Pamukçu, Sındırgı, Gönen)
- Bolu (Karacasu, Babas, Sarot, Seben, Çatak)
- Bursa (Çelik Palas, Kükürtlü, Karamustafa, Kaynarca, Eski Kaplıca)
- Çanakkale (Afrodit, Külcüler, Çan, Tepeköy, Hıdırlar, Kestanbolu, Kızılca, Küçük Çeymi)
- Çankırı (Çavundur, Acısu)
- Denizli (Pamukkale, Gölemezli, Babacık, Tekkeköy, Kızıldere, Çizmeli, Karahayıt)
- Diyarbakır (Çermik)
- Erzurum (Pasinler, Ilıca, Köprüköy)
- Eskişehir (City center, Sakarılıca, Hamamkarahisar, Yarıkçı, Kızılinler)
- Istanbul (Tuzla)
- İzmir (Balçova, Nebiler, Reisdere, Karakoç, Gülbahçe)
- Kahramanmaraş (Ekinözü, Büyük Kızılcık, Zeytun)
- Kayseri (Bayramhacı, Yeşilhisar, Tekgöz, Hacı Veli)
- Konya (Ilgın, İsmil, Seydişehir, Karasu, Kuşaklı)
- Kütahya (Harlek, Yoncalı, Yeşil, Kaynarca, Murat Dağı, Simav-Eynal, Tavşanlı-Göbel, Hisarcık-Esire, Çıtgöl, Dereli)
- Kırşehir (Terme, Karakurt, Bulamaçlı, Mahmutlu)
- Manisa (Kurşunlu, Sart, Urganlı, Emir, Saraycık, Hisar, Menteşe, Ilıcak)
- Muğla (Fethiye, Bodrum, Dalaman)
- Nevşehir (Kozaklı)
- Rize (Ayder)
- Sakarya (Kuzuluk, Acısu, Taraklı, Çökek)
- Sivas (Akçaağıl, Alamani, Kangal, Balıklı, Ortaköy, Sıcak/Soğuk Çermiği)
- Tokat (Sulusaray, Reşadiye)
- Yalova (Termal, Armutlu)
- Yozgat (Sarıkaya, Saraykent, Karadikmeni, Boğazlıyan, Sorgun, Yerköy)

=== United Kingdom ===
There are many geothermal springs in the UK, but the hot springs found in the town of Bath, Somerset are the only true hot springs (defined as those hotter than 37 degrees C):

- Bath
  - Cross Bath, 42.8 °C, 109 °F
  - Hetling Spring, 45.4 °C, 113.7 °F
  - Hot Bath, 47.2 °C, 117 °F
  - King's Bath, 45.6 °C, 114 °F
  - Stall Street Fountain, 45.4 °C, 113.7 °F

Other thermal or warm springs in the UK include:

- Buxton Baths warm spring, 27 °C / 80 °F
- Hotwells spring in Bristol 25 °C, 77 °F
- Matlock Bath warm spring, 20 °C / 68 °F
- St Ann's Well, Buxton, Derbyshire, 28 °C, 82.4 °F
- Taff's Well Thermal Spring, Cardiff, South Wales, 21.6 °C, 70.9 °F

== Oceania ==
=== Australia ===
Hot springs can be found in all six states of Australia as well as the Northern Territory, but apparently not Australian Capital Territory.

- Dalhousie Springs, South Australia, 38–43 degrees C
- Elizabeth Springs, Queensland
- Hastings Caves and Thermal Springs, Tasmania, south of Hobart, 28 degrees C
- Innot Hot Springs, Queensland
- Katherine Hot Springs, Northern Territory
- Kimberley Warm Springs, near Devonport, Tasmania 25 degrees C
- Mataranka Hot Springs, Northern Territory
- Muckadilla Hot Springs, near Roma, Queensland
- Paralana Hot Springs, near Arkaroola, South Australia, issue at 62 degrees C from uranium-rich granite, and contain radon
- Peninsula Hot Springs, Victoria, on the Mornington Peninsula
- Pilliga, Moree, Lightning Ridge, New South Wales
- Tjuwaliyn (Douglas) Hot Springs, Northern Territory
- Yarrangobilly Caves thermal pool, New South Wales
- Zebedee Springs, within El Questro Station, and Bibawarra Bore near Carnarvon, Western Australia

=== Fiji ===
Hot springs are in the town of Savusavu where local people use the hot springs to cook their food. Some of the springs are situated on the beach and steam can be seen rising from the water at low tide.

=== New Zealand ===
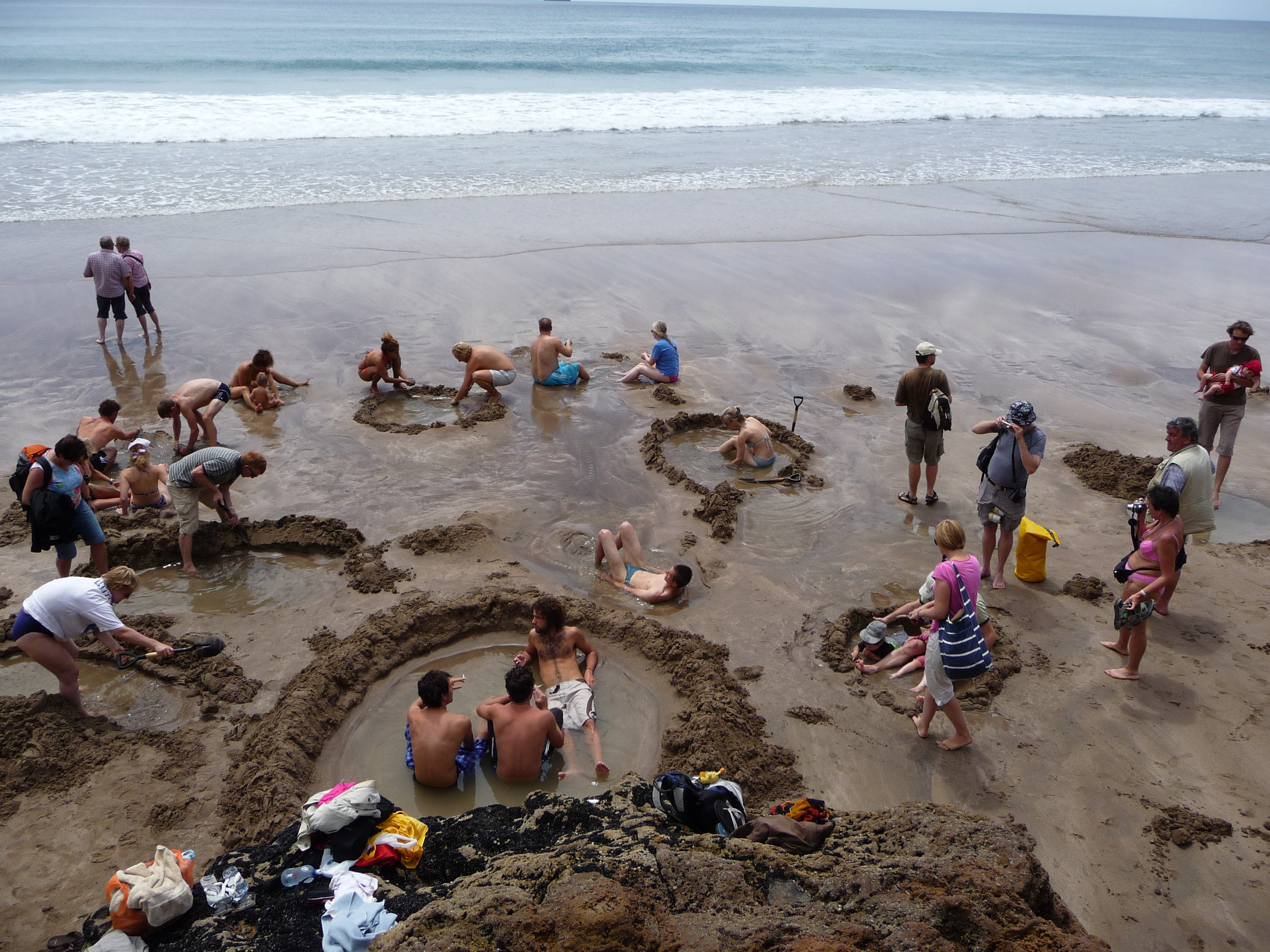
Excavations on Hot Water Beach, New Zealand

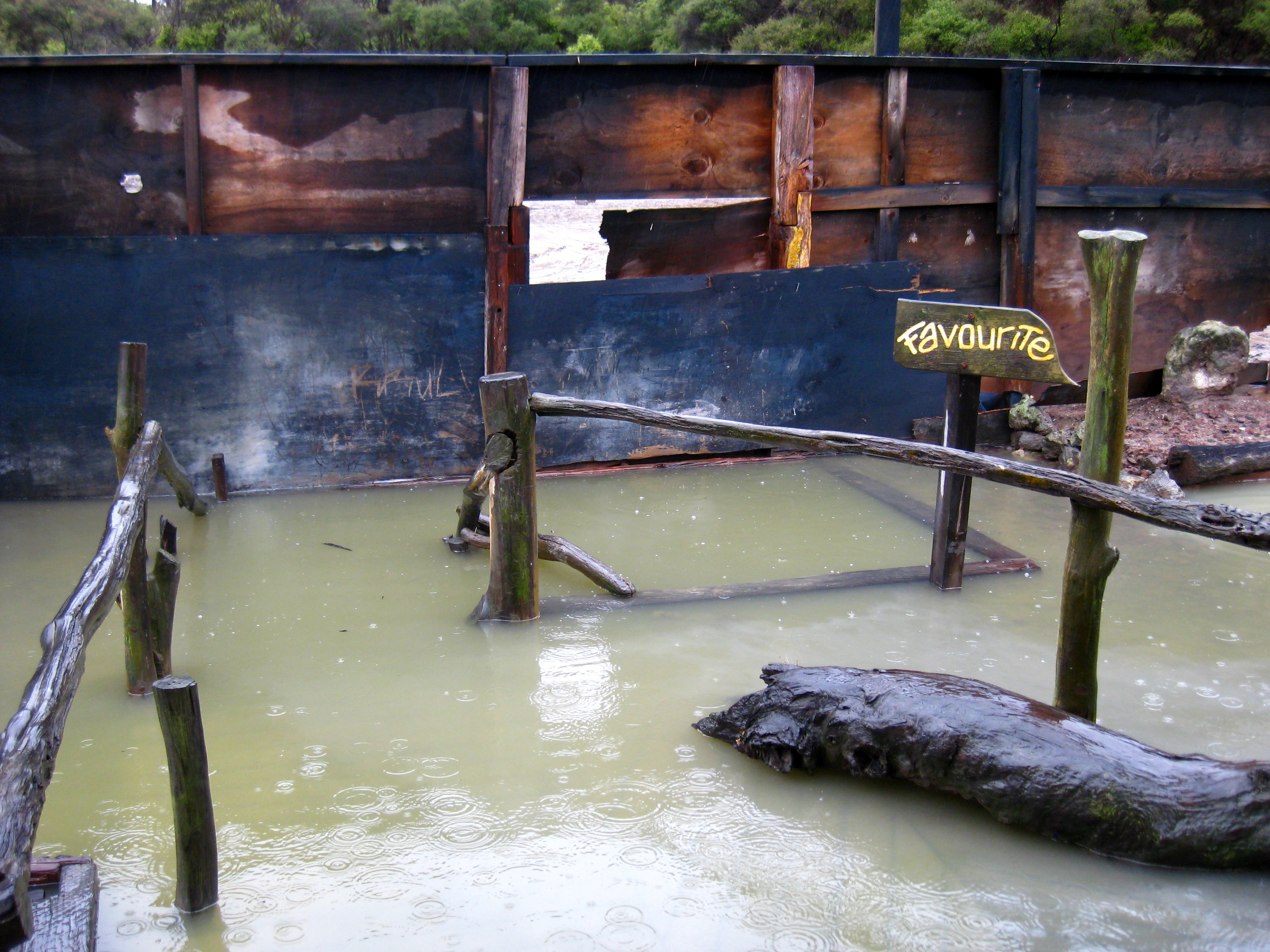
Ngawha Springs, New Zealand

There are numerous hot springs in New Zealand, predominantly in the Taupō Volcanic Zone, and in particular around Rotorua. Well known springs outside the Taupō Volcanic Zone include:

- Hanmer Springs
- Hot Water Beach
- The Lost Spring in Whitianga, Coromandel Peninsula
- Maruia Springs
- Morere Hotsprings in Wairoa District, Hawke's Bay
- Ngawha Springs
- Waimangu Volcanic Rift Valley
  - Frying Pan Lake now known as Waimangu Cauldron
  - Pink and White Terraces
- Waingaro
- Waiotapu
- Waiwera
- Welcome Flat, on the Copland Track
- Whakarewarewa

== Hot springs parks ==
It is common to create parks around hot springs:

- Banff National Park and Jasper National Park in Canada
- Gorongosa National Park in Mozambique
- Sembawang Hot Spring Park in Mandai, Singapore
- Shikotsu-Toya National Park in Hokkaidō, Japan
- Sitakunda Eco Park in Sitakunda, Bangladesh
- Yangmingshan National Park in Taiwan
- Yankari Games Reserve in Bauchi, Nigeria

United States

- Arkansas
  - Hot Springs National Park
- California
  - Death Valley National Park
  - Lassen Volcanic National Park
- Idaho, Montana & Wyoming
  - Yellowstone National Park
- Texas
  - Big Bend National Park
- Washington
  - Olympic National Park

== See also ==
- List of spa towns
- List of hot springs in the United States
- List of Hot Springs and Mineral Springs of Bhutan
