= List of hot springs in the United States =

Hot springs in the United States
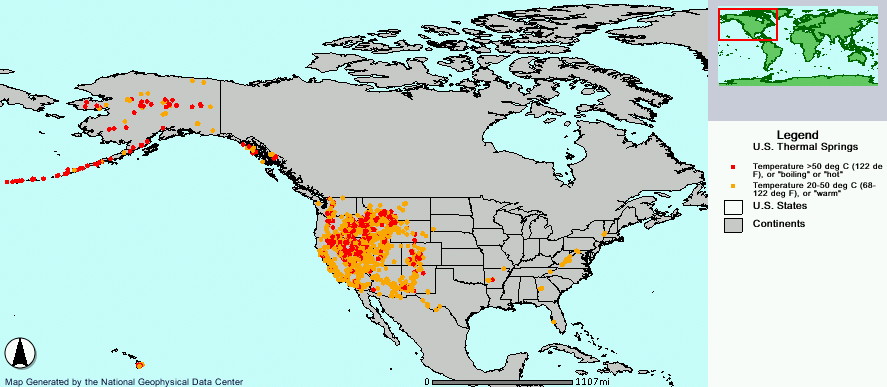

This is a dynamic list of hot springs in the United States. The Western states in particular are known for their thermal springs: Alaska, Arizona, California, Colorado, Idaho, Montana, Nevada, New Mexico, Oregon, Utah, Washington, Wyoming; but there are interesting hot springs in other states throughout the country. Indigenous peoples' use of thermal springs can be traced back 10,000 years, per archaeological evidence of human use and settlement by Paleo-Indians. These geothermal resources provided warmth, healing mineral water, and cleansing. Hot springs are considered sacred by several Indigenous cultures, and along with sweat lodges have been used for ceremonial purposes. Since ancient times, humans have used hot springs, public baths and thermal medicine for therapeutic effects. Bathing in hot, mineral water is an ancient ritual. The Latin phrase sanitas per aquam means "health through water", involving the treatment of disease and various ailments by balneotherapy in natural hot springs.

There are several types of hot springs, including those with tasteless, colorless and odorless water; sulfur springs with a distinctive smell of "rotten eggs"; sodium chloride springs with a high salt content; iron springs which tend to be red in color and have a high iron content; copper springs that contain both copper and iron with yellow tinted water; bicarbonate or hydrogen carbonate springs containing alkaline water that can be a skin irritant; carbon dioxide springs with colorless water through which carbon dioxide gas percolates through the water giving it a "fizzy" quality; radon or radium springs that contain small quantities of naturally occurring radioactive materials; and sulphate springs that often have viscous water that is bitter in taste.

Many hot springs are natural rock soaking pools that are only accessible on foot or horseback, while others are developed into resort spas.

== Alaska ==
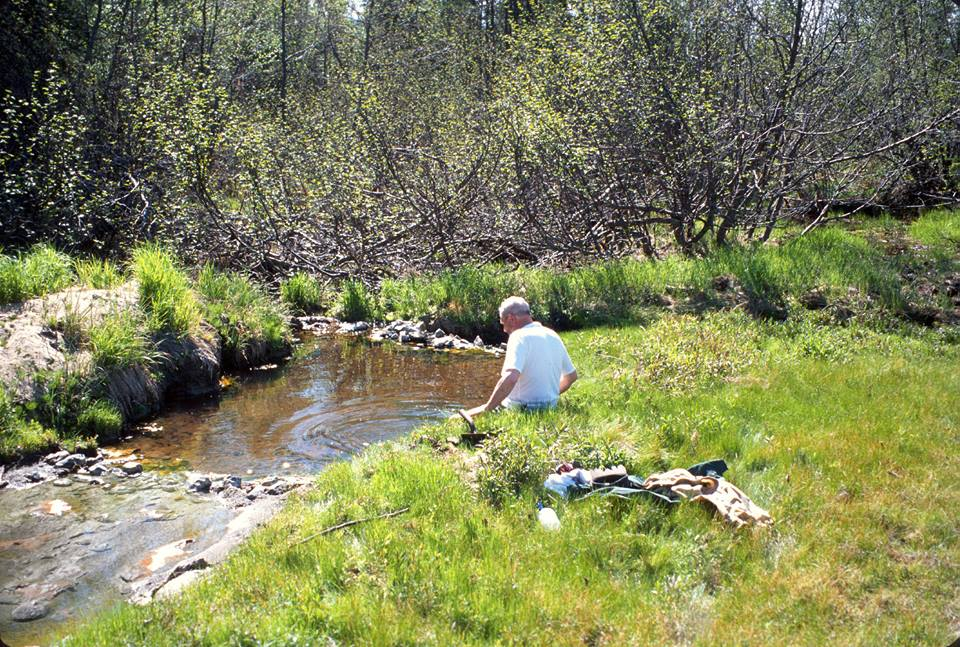
Kanuti Hot Springs Area of Critical Environmental Concern, Alaska

- Akutan Hot Springs
- Baranof Warm Springs (thermal mineral springs)
- Chena Hot Springs
- Chief Shakes Hot Springs
- Circle Hot Springs
- Hutlinana Hot Springs
- Kanuti Hot Springs
- Manley Hot Springs
- Tolovana Hot Springs

== Arizona ==
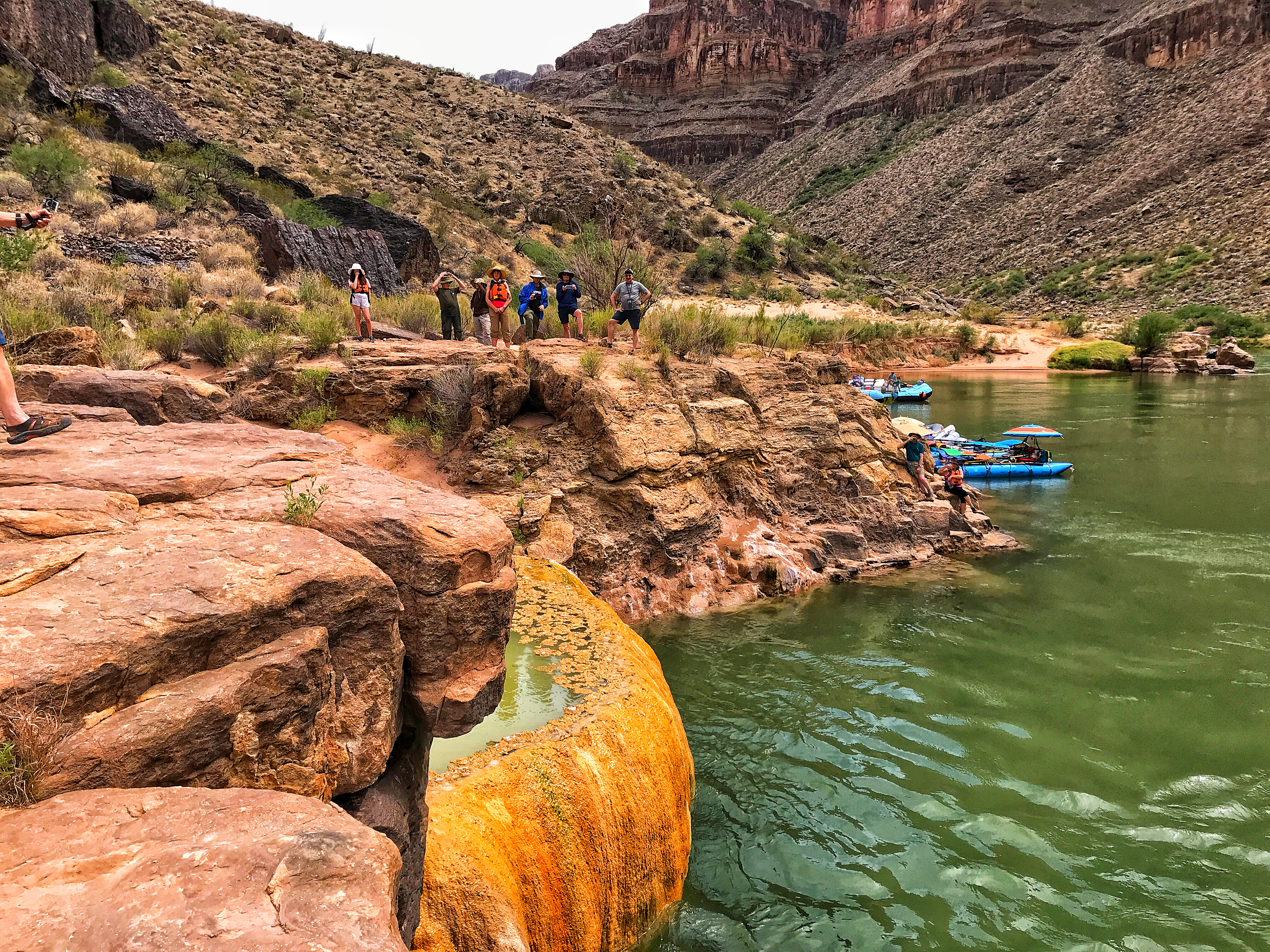
Pumpkin Spring, Grand Canyon

- Arizona (Ringbolt) Hot Springs
- Buckhorn Hot Mineral Wells and Buckhorn Baths
- Castle Hot Springs
- El Dorado Hot Springs
- Gold Strike Hot Springs
- Hot Well Dunes
- Indian Hot Springs
- Pumpkin Spring
- Roper Lake State Park Hot Spring
- Sheep Bridge Hot Spring
- Tonopah
- Verde Hot Springs

== Arkansas ==
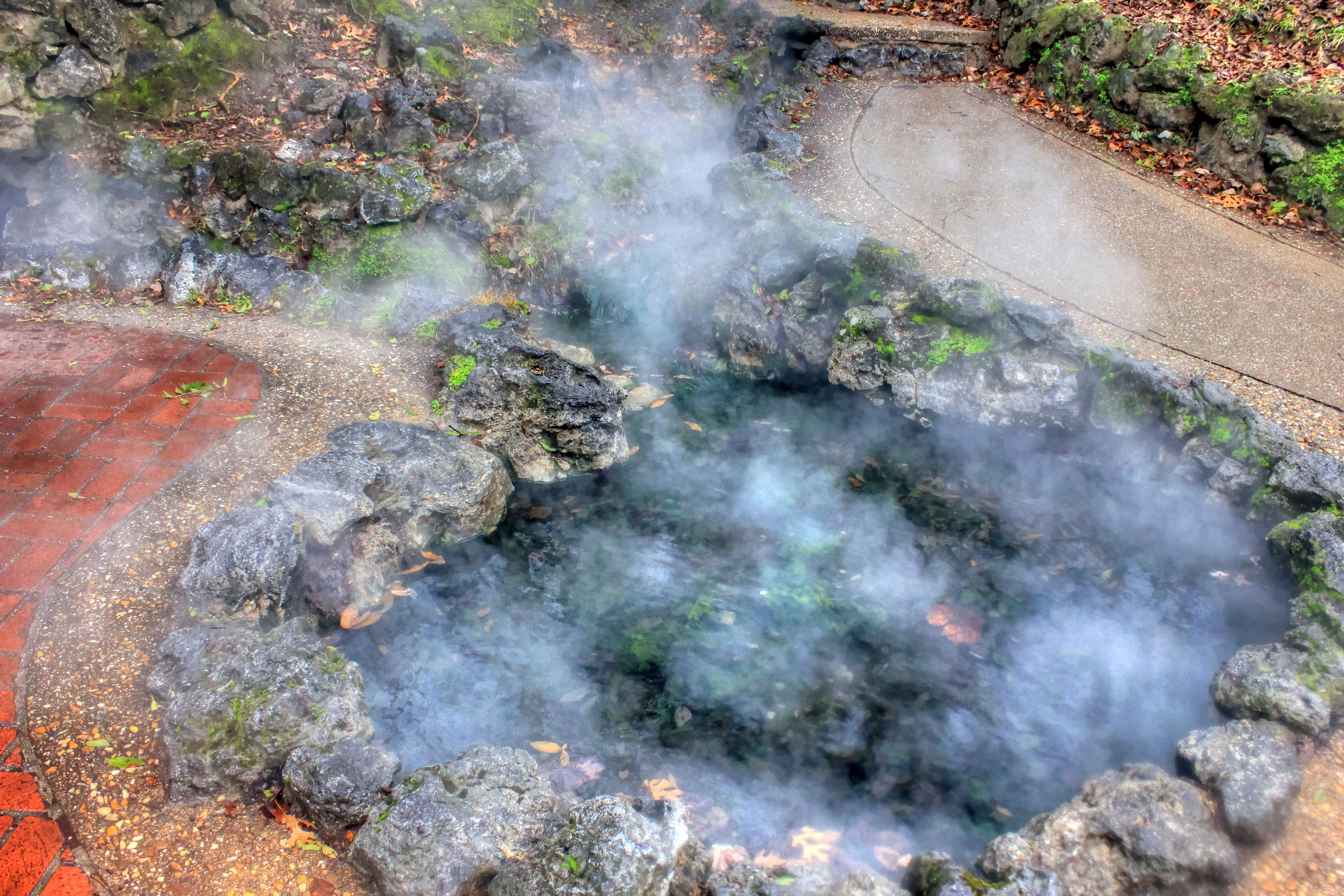
Arkansas hot springs, steam from spring

- Hot Springs

== California ==
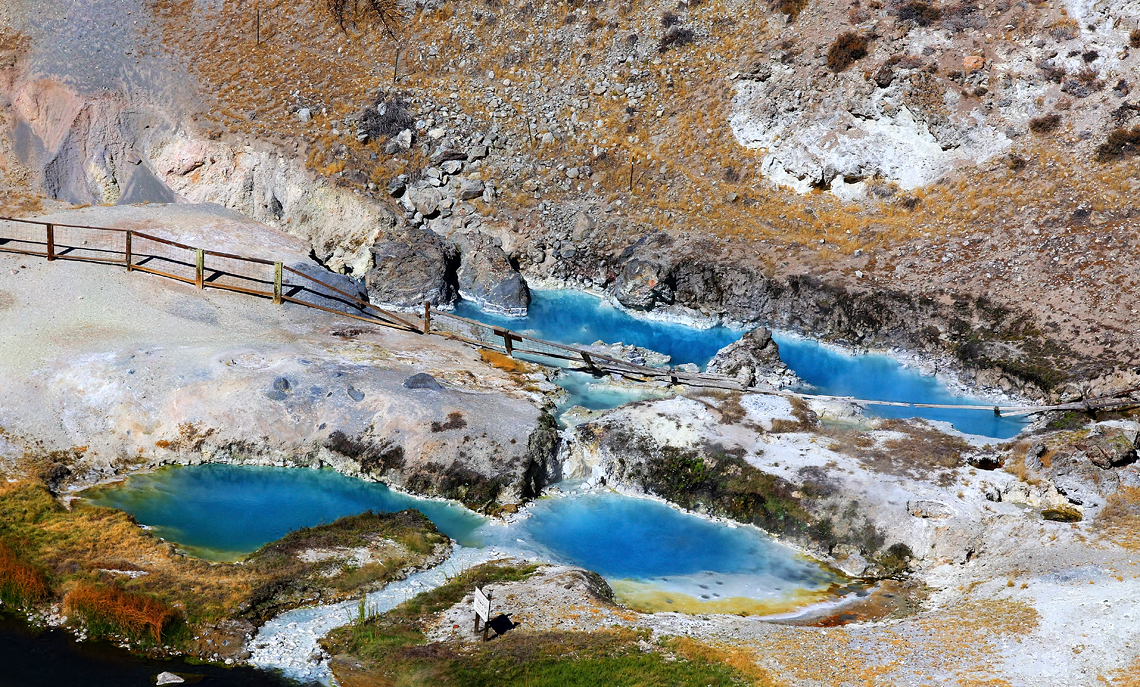
Mammoth Hot Creek Pools

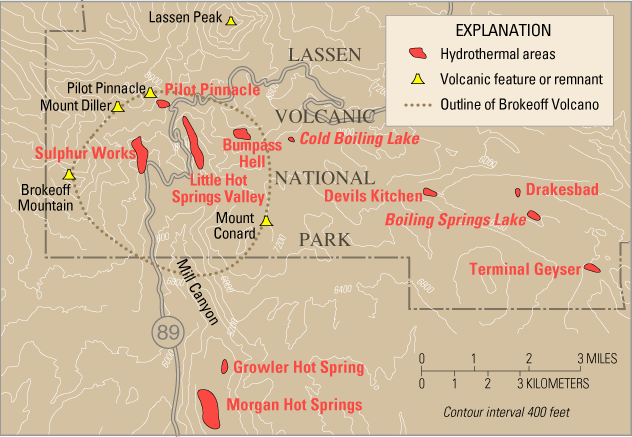
Geothermal areas in Lassen area

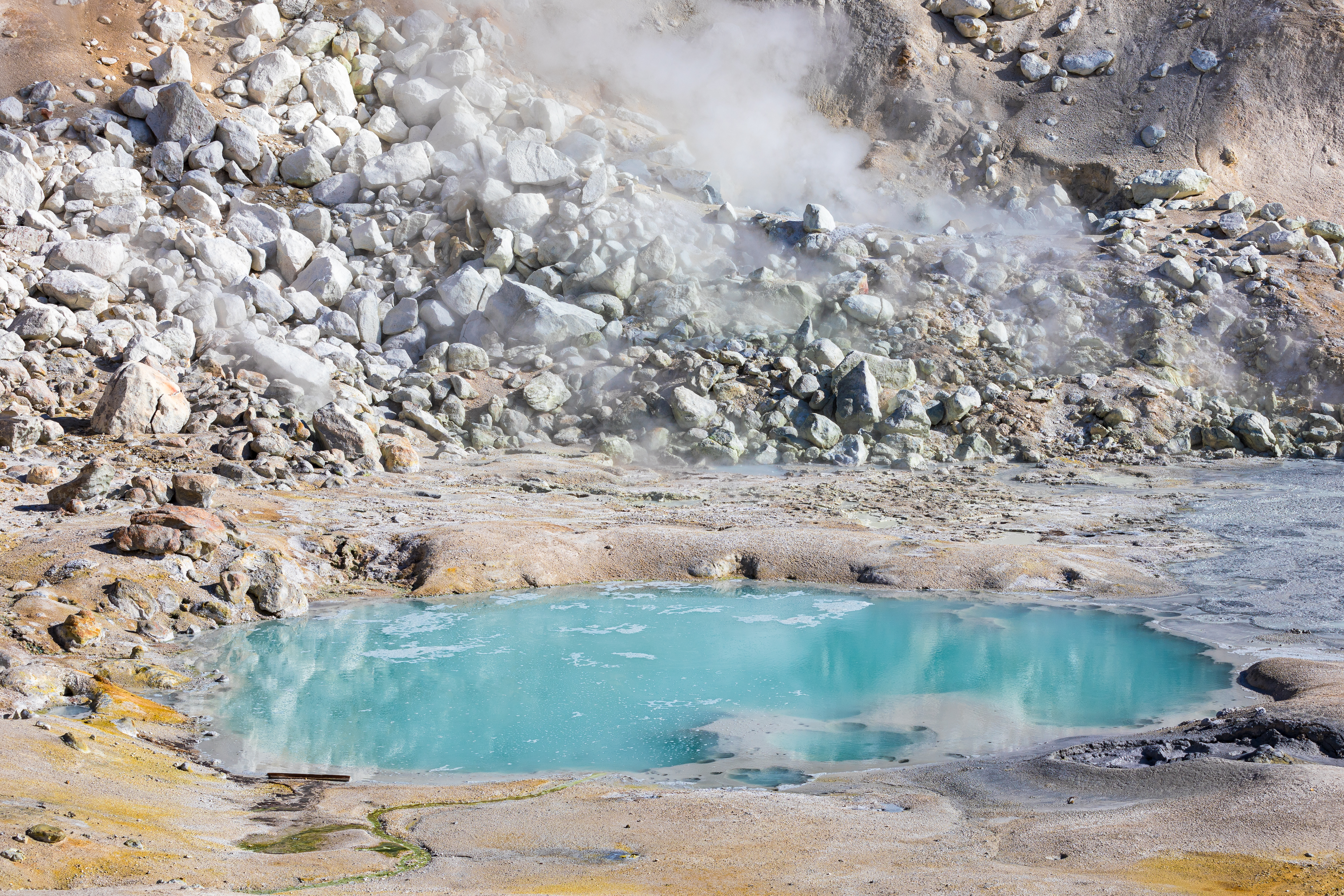
Aquamarine water pool at Bumpass Hell

- Avila Hot Springs, previously known as Ontario Hot Springs
- Beverly Hot Springs
- Big Bend Hot Springs
- Big Caliente Hot Springs (Los Padres National Forest)
- Bumpass Hell Creek (Lassen National Park)
- Calistoga
- Calistoga Spa Hot Springs
- Campbell Hot Springs
- Casa Diablo Hot Springs
- Coso Hot Springs (Inyo County)
- Crabtree Hot Springs
- Crab Cooker Hot Springs
- Deep Creek Hot Springs
- Delonegha Hot Springs
- Democrat Hot Springs
- Desert Hot Springs (Riverside County)
- Dirty Socks Hot Spring
- Encino Hot Springs
- Esalen Hot Springs
- Franklin Hot Springs (San Luis Obispo County)
- Gaviota Hot Springs
- Gilman Hot Springs
- Gilroy Yamato Hot Springs
- Grover Hot Springs
- Harbin Hot Springs (Lake County)
- Hot Creek
- Jordan Hot Springs (Sequoia National Forest)
- Keough Hot Springs
- Long Valley Caldera
- Matilija Hot Springs
- Mercey Hot Springs
- Miracle Hot Springs
- Mono Hot Springs
- Montecito Hot Springs
- Murrieta Hot Springs
- Ojai Hot Springs
- Paso Robles Hot Springs
- Palm Springs
- Remington Hot Springs
- Saline Valley Hot Springs
- San Juan Hot Springs
- Scovern Hot Springs
- Sespe Hot Springs
- Slates Hot Springs
- Tassajara Hot Springs
- Tecopa Hot Springs
- Travertine Hot Springs
- Warner Springs
- White Point Hot Springs
- White Sulphur Springs (Napa County)
- Wilbur Hot Springs
- Wild Willy's Hot Springs
- Willett Hot Springs

== Colorado ==
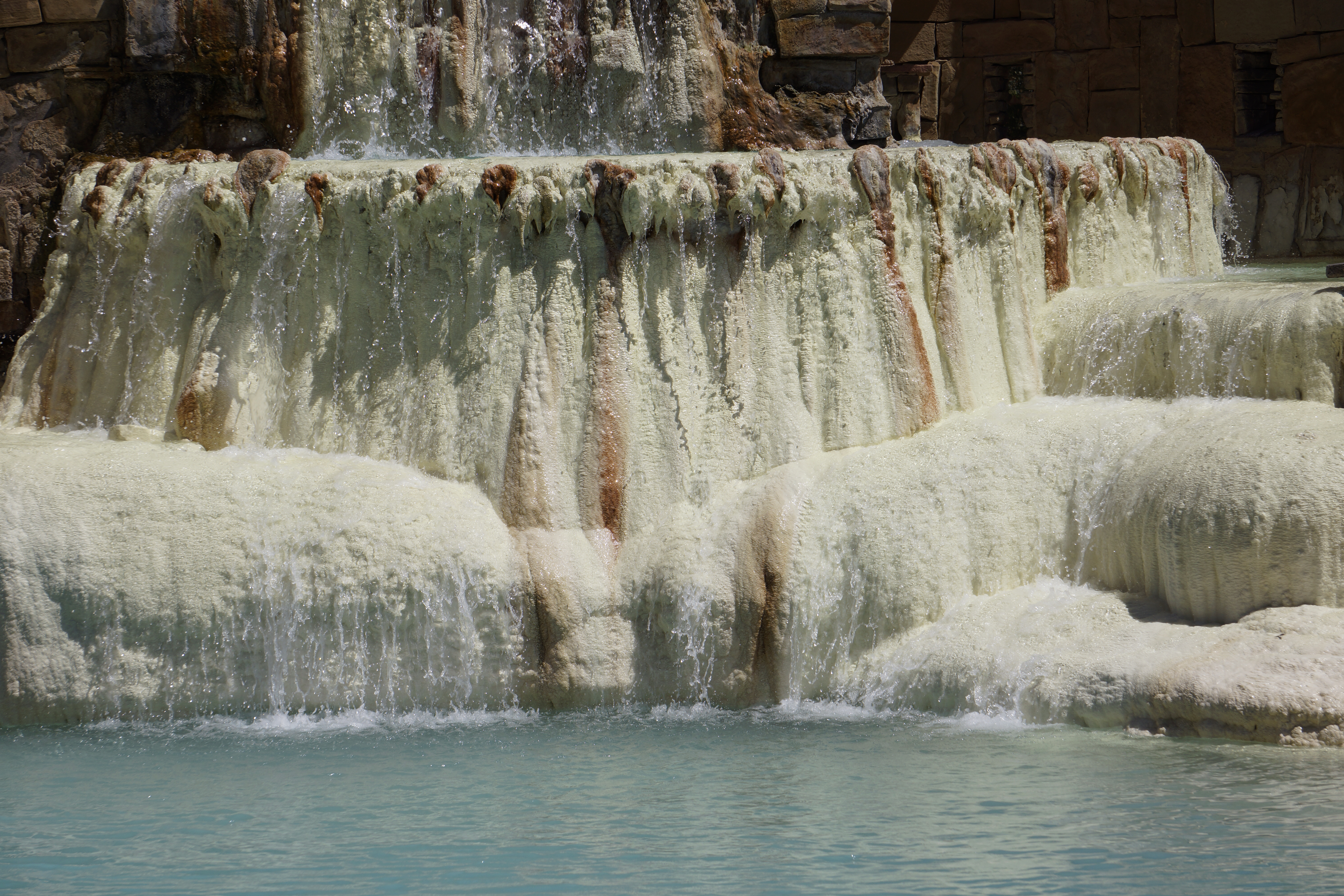
The Mother Spring, Pagosa Hot Springs, Colorado

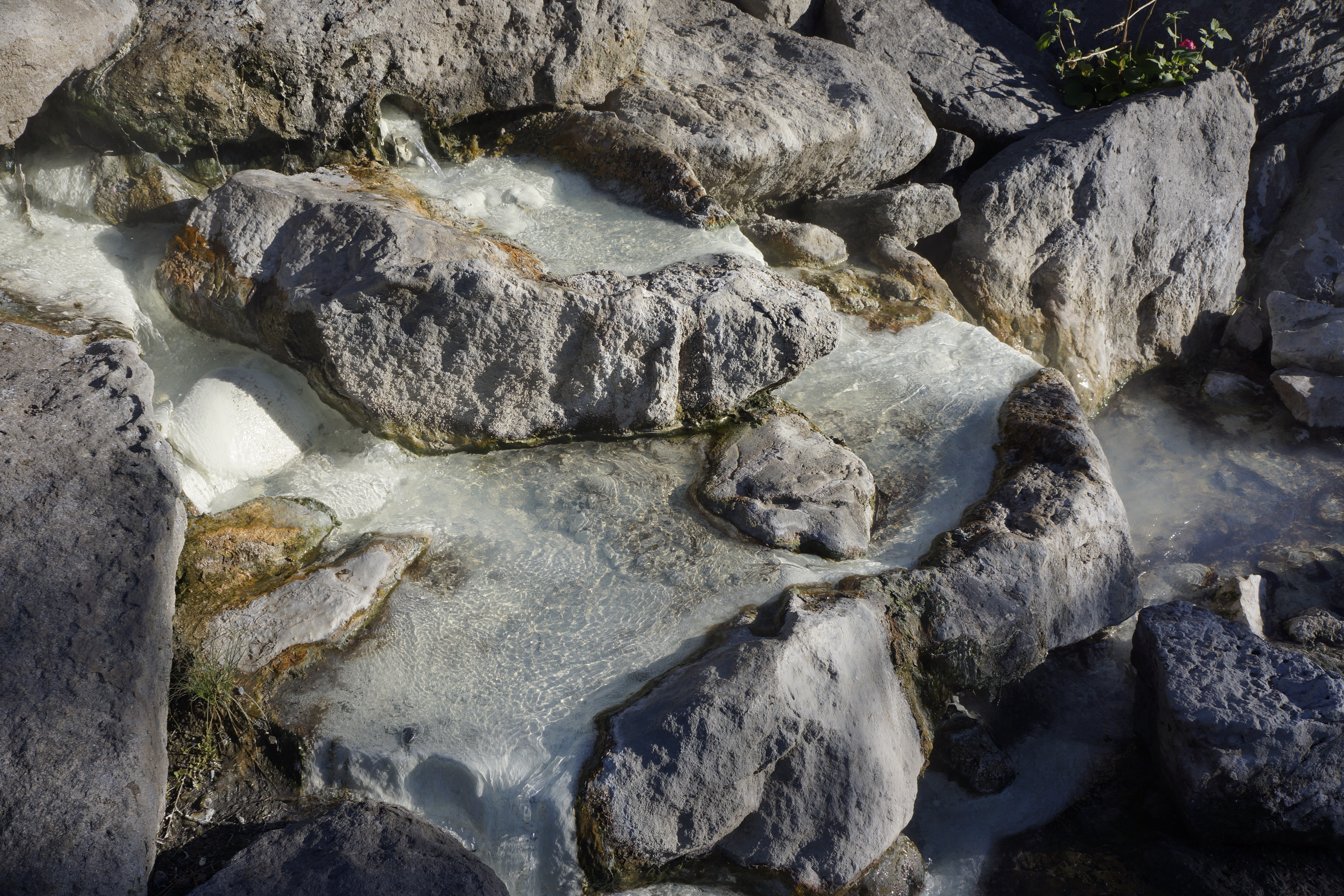
Pagosa Hot Spring, Colorado

- Conundrum Hot Springs
- Dunton Hot Springs
- Glenwood Springs
- Hot Sulphur Springs
- Idaho Springs
- Nathrop
- Orvis Hot Springs
- Ouray
- Pagosa hot springs
- Penny Hot Springs
- Radium Hot Springs
- Salida
- Santa Maria warm spring
- Steamboat Springs
- Wiesbaden Hot Springs

== Florida ==
- Warm Mineral Springs, Florida

== Georgia ==
- Radium Hot Springs, Georgia
- Warm Springs, Georgia

== Hawaii ==
- Ahalanui Hot Pond
- Kapoho Warm Springs Tide Pools, some on private property
- Pohoiki Warm Spring, one of several warm springs, part of the Isaac Hale Park warm springs system

== Idaho ==
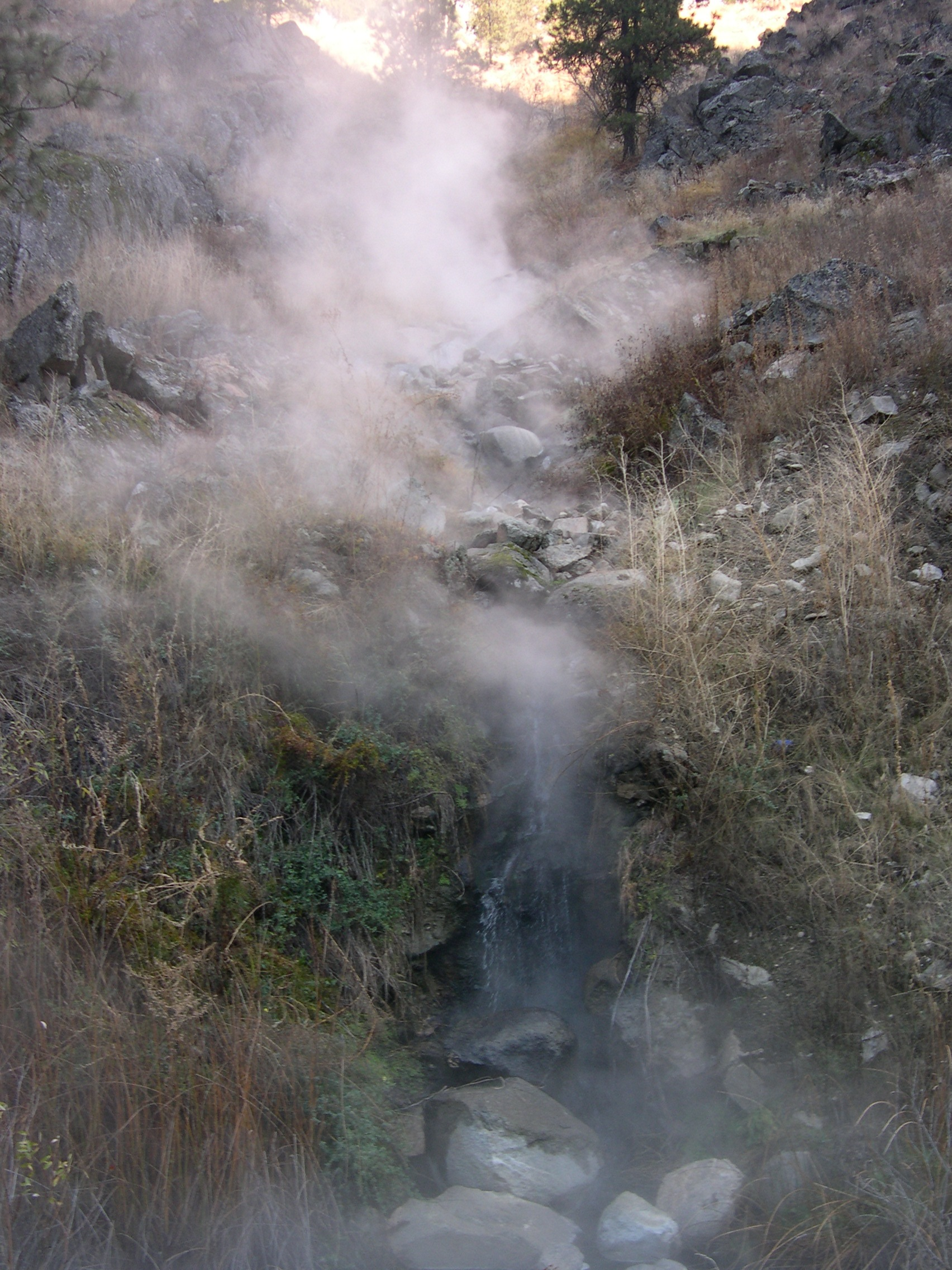
Hot spring near Garden Valley Idaho

- Boat Box Hot Spring
- Burgdorf Hot Springs
- Frenchman's Hot Springs
- Goldbug Hot Springs
- Gold Fork Hot Springs
- Green Canyon Hot Springs
- Heise Hot Springs, Ririe
- Hopkins Hot Springs, also known as Maple Grove hot springs, Thatcher, Idaho
- Kirkham Hot Springs
- Lava Hot Springs
- Pine Flat Hot Springs
- Silver Creek Hot Spring
- Stanley Hot Springs
- Sunflower Hot Springs

== Illinois ==
- Little Hot Springs of Illinois

== Indiana ==
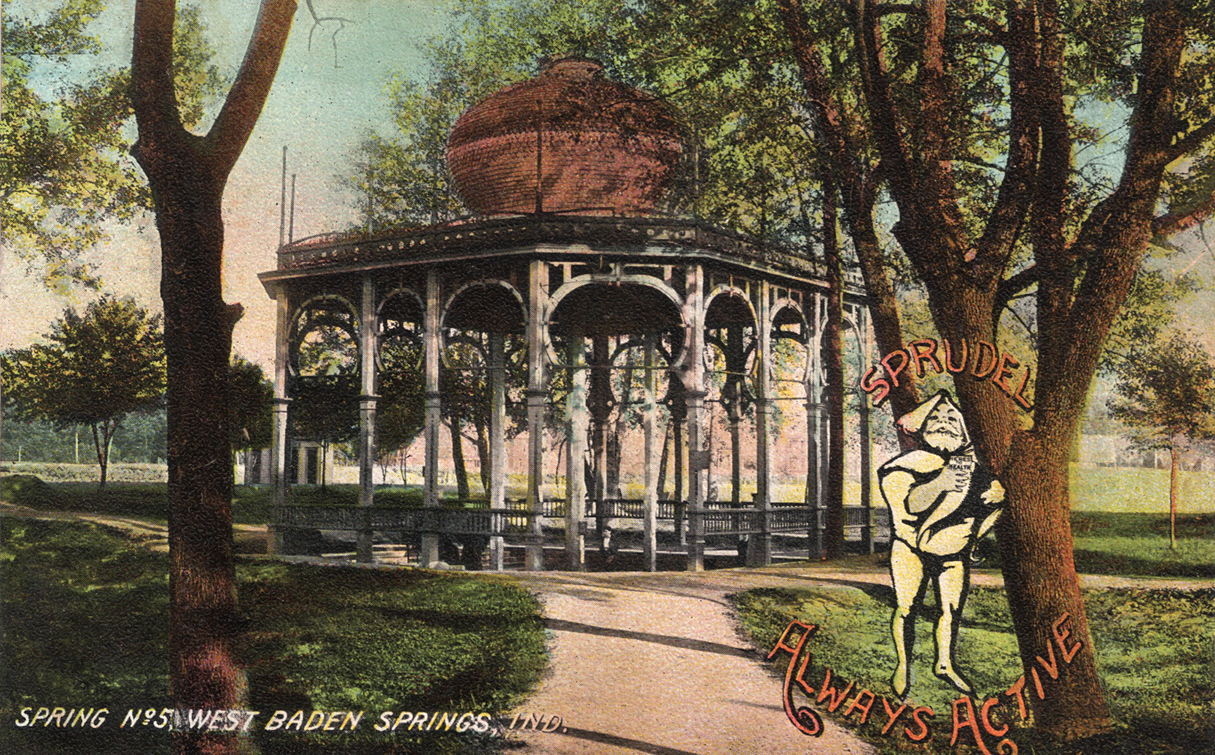
West Baden Springs Indiana 1906

- West Baden Springs

== Massachusetts ==
- Sand Spring (75 °F / 24 °C)

== Montana ==
- Alhambra Hot Springs
- Barkels Hot Springs
- Big Hole Hot Springs
- Boulder Hot Springs
- Broadwater Hot Springs
- Camas Hot Springs
- Chico Hot Springs
- Corwin Hot Springs
- Elkhorn Hot Springs
- Gregson Hot Springs
- Hunters Hot Springs
- Lolo Hot Springs
- Medicine Rock Hot Springs
- Norris Hot Springs
- Pipestone Hot Springs
- Potosi Hot Springs
- Pullers Hot Springs
- Sleeping Buffalo Hot Springs
- Sleeping Child Hot Springs
- White Sulphur Hot Springs
- Wild Horse Hot Springs
- Zeigler Hot Springs

== Nevada ==
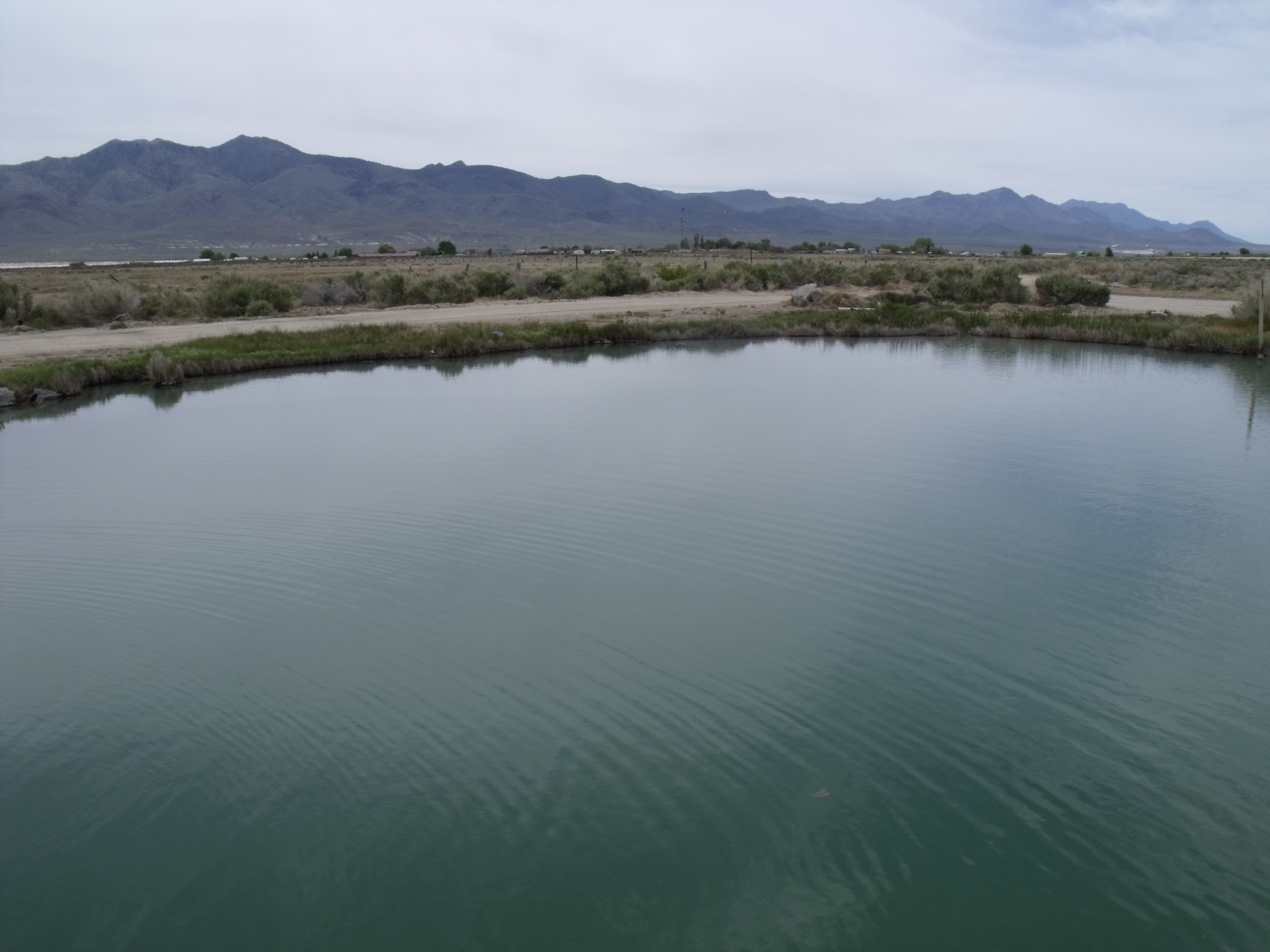
Great Boiling Spring near Gerlach, Nevada

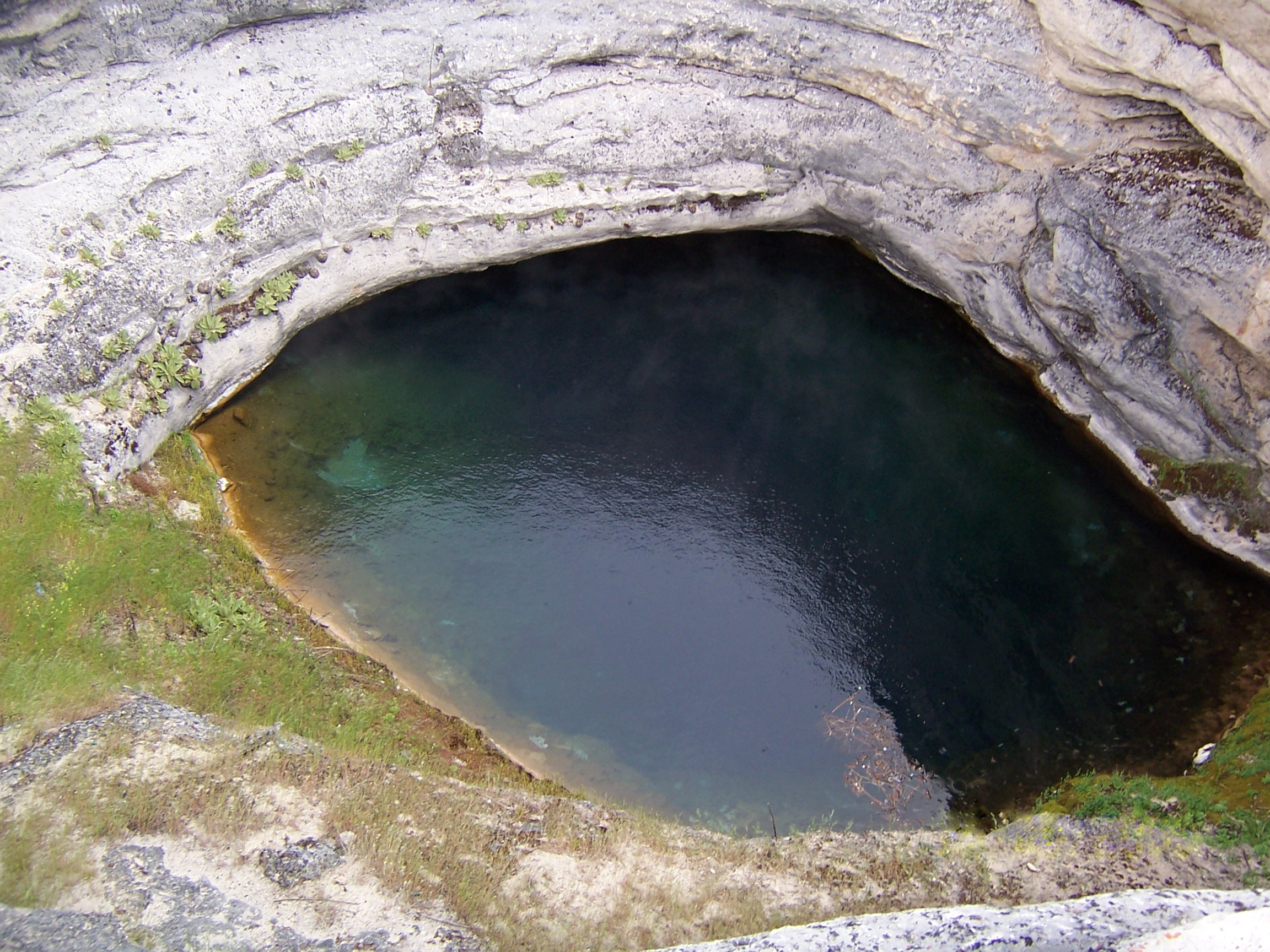
Diana's Punchbowl, Nevada

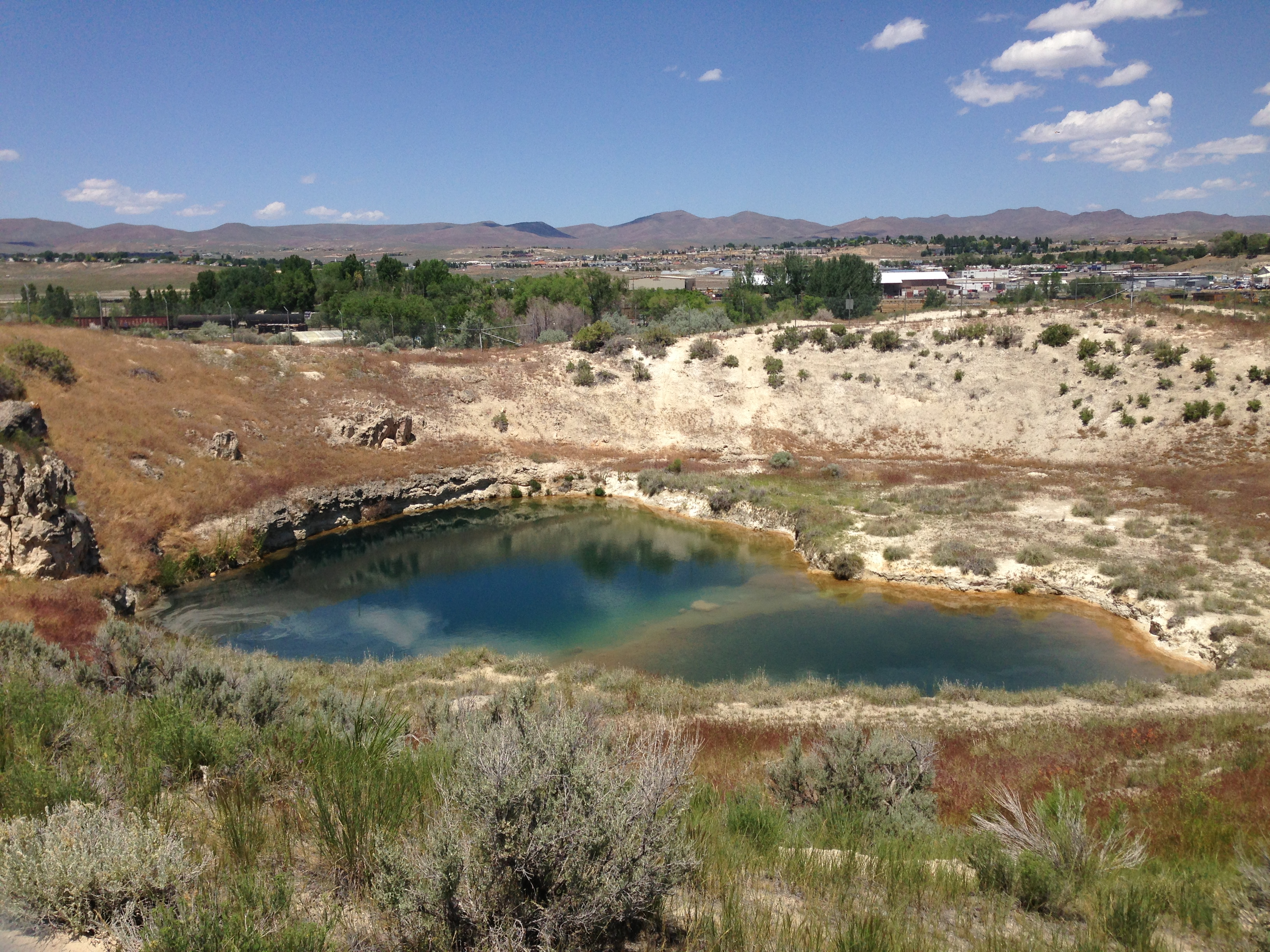
View across the Elko Hot Hole

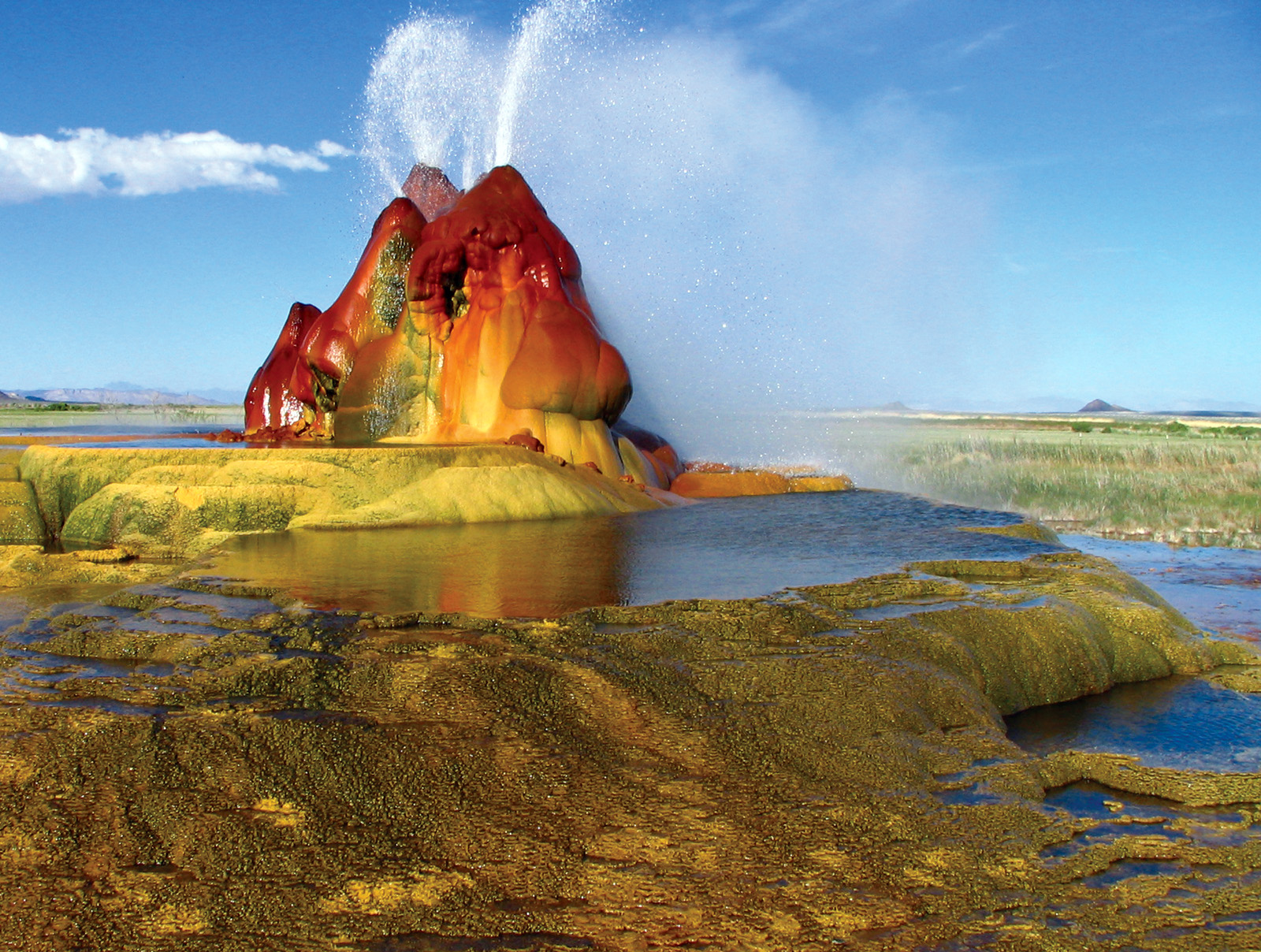
Fly geyser

- Ash Springs, N 37 27.810 W 115 11.547 (95 °F)
- Bartine Hot Springs (105 °F)
- Bathtub Spring (Soldier Meadows)
- Bog Hot Springs (105 °F)
- Bowers Mansion Hot Springs (116 °F)
- Carson Hot Springs (95°–110 °F)
- Chukar Gulch (Soldier Meadows) (104 °F)
- Crescent View Hot Springs (185 °F)
- Crystal Springs hot springs, Crystal Springs, Nevada ghost town (81 °F-90 °F)
- Diana's Punchbowl (183°)
- Dry Suzie (Hot Sulphur) Hot Springs (145 °F)
- Dyke Hot Spring (150 °F)
- Elko Hot Hole
- Fish Lake Valley Hot Well (120 °F)
- Fly Geyser
- Great Boiling Spring
- Hot Creek Springs and Marsh Area (85 °F)
- Hyder Hot Springs (95°–150 °F)
- Jersey Valley Hot Springs (120 °F)
- Panaca Warm Springs (78°–86 °F)
- Paradise Valley Hot Springs
- Pott's Ranch Hot Spring (113 °F)
- Rainbow Hot Springs (Smith Creek) (197°)
- Reese River Hot Springs (Valley of the Moon) (105 °F)
- Rogers Warm Spring
- Ruby Valley Hot Springs (106°–122 °F)
- Soldier Meadows hot spring system
  - Soldier Meadows Hot Creek (106°–112 °F)
  - Soldier Meadows Warm Pond (85 °F)
- Spencer Hot Springs (101°)
- Steamboat Hot Well (204 °F)
- Trego Hot Springs (185 °F)
- Twelve Mile Hot Springs
- Virgin Valley Hot Springs

== New Mexico ==
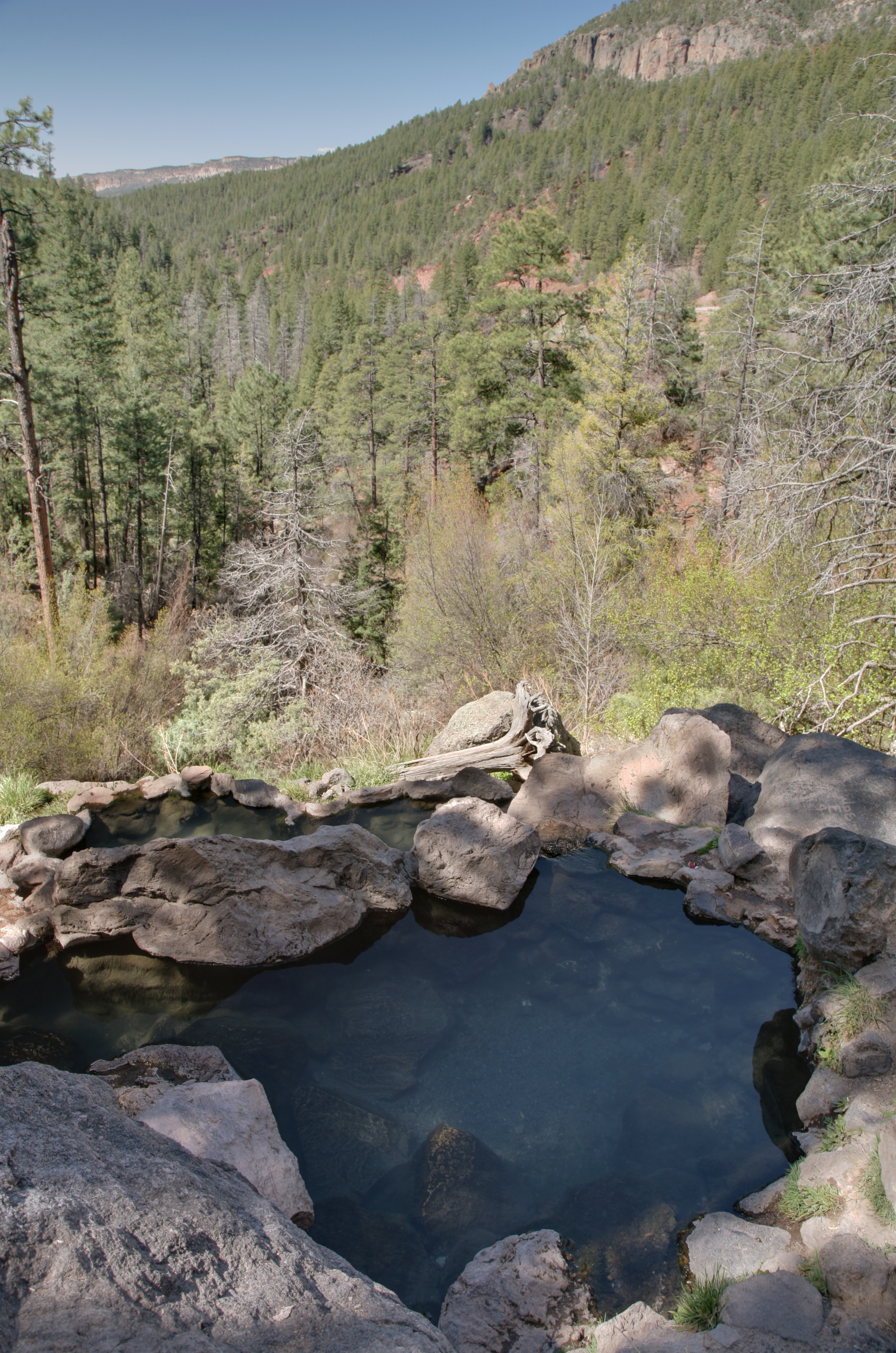
Spence hot spring

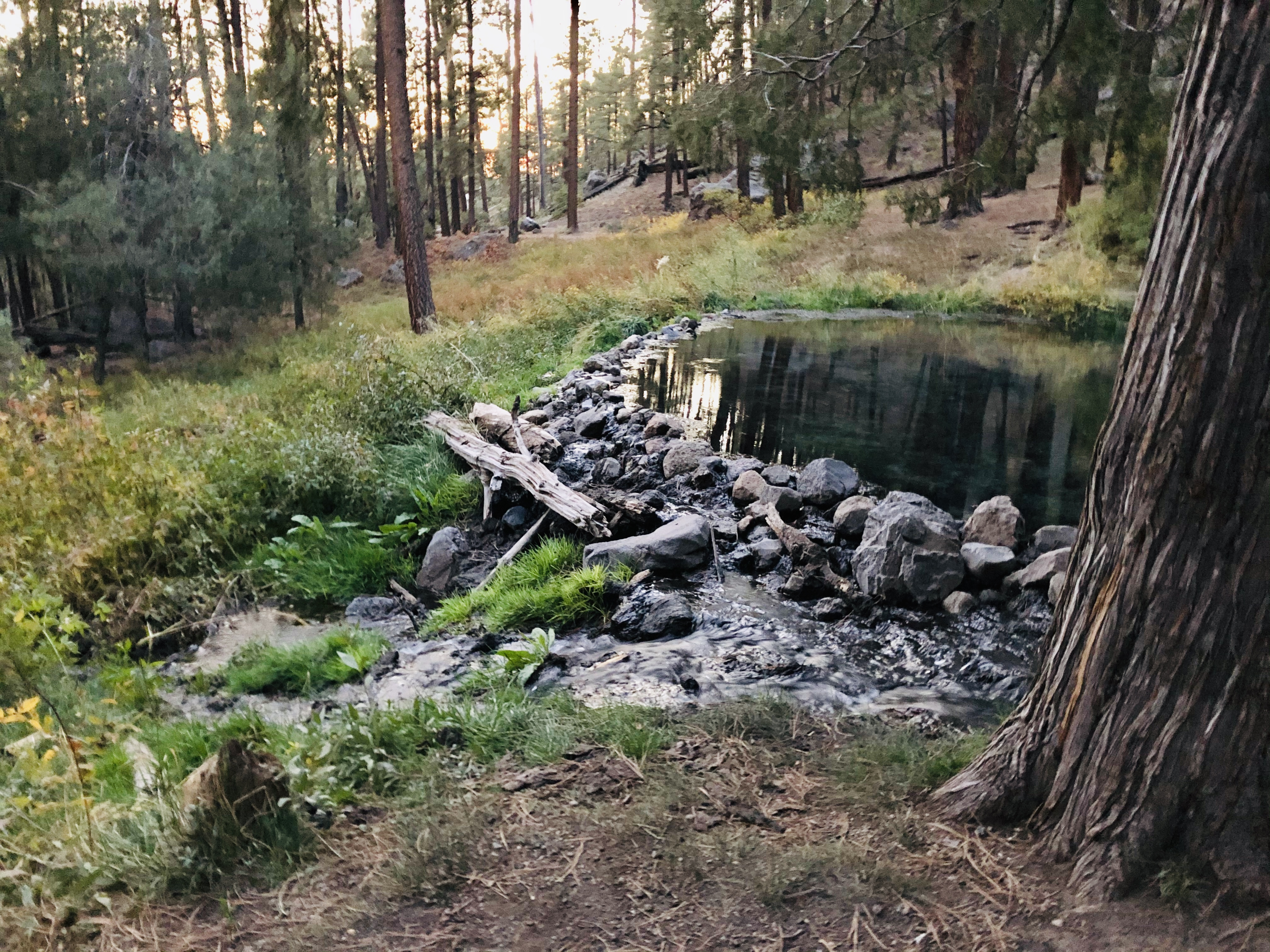
McCauley Hot Springs, Jemez Springs, NM, USA

- Black Rock Hot Springs
- Faywood Hot Springs
- Gila Hot Springs
- Jemez Springs Bath House, Jemez Springs, New Mexico
- Jordan Hot Springs (New Mexico) (Gila National Forest)
- Manby Hot Springs, also known as Stagecoach Hot Springs, near Taos
- McCauley Hot Springs, Jemez Springs
- Montezuma Hot Springs, Montezuma, near Las Vegas, New Mexico
- Ojo Caliente Hot Springs
- Radium Hot Springs
- San Antonio Hot Springs, Jemez Springs
- Soda Dam Hot Spring
- Spence Hot Springs, Jemez Springs
- Truth or Consequences Hot Springs

== New York ==
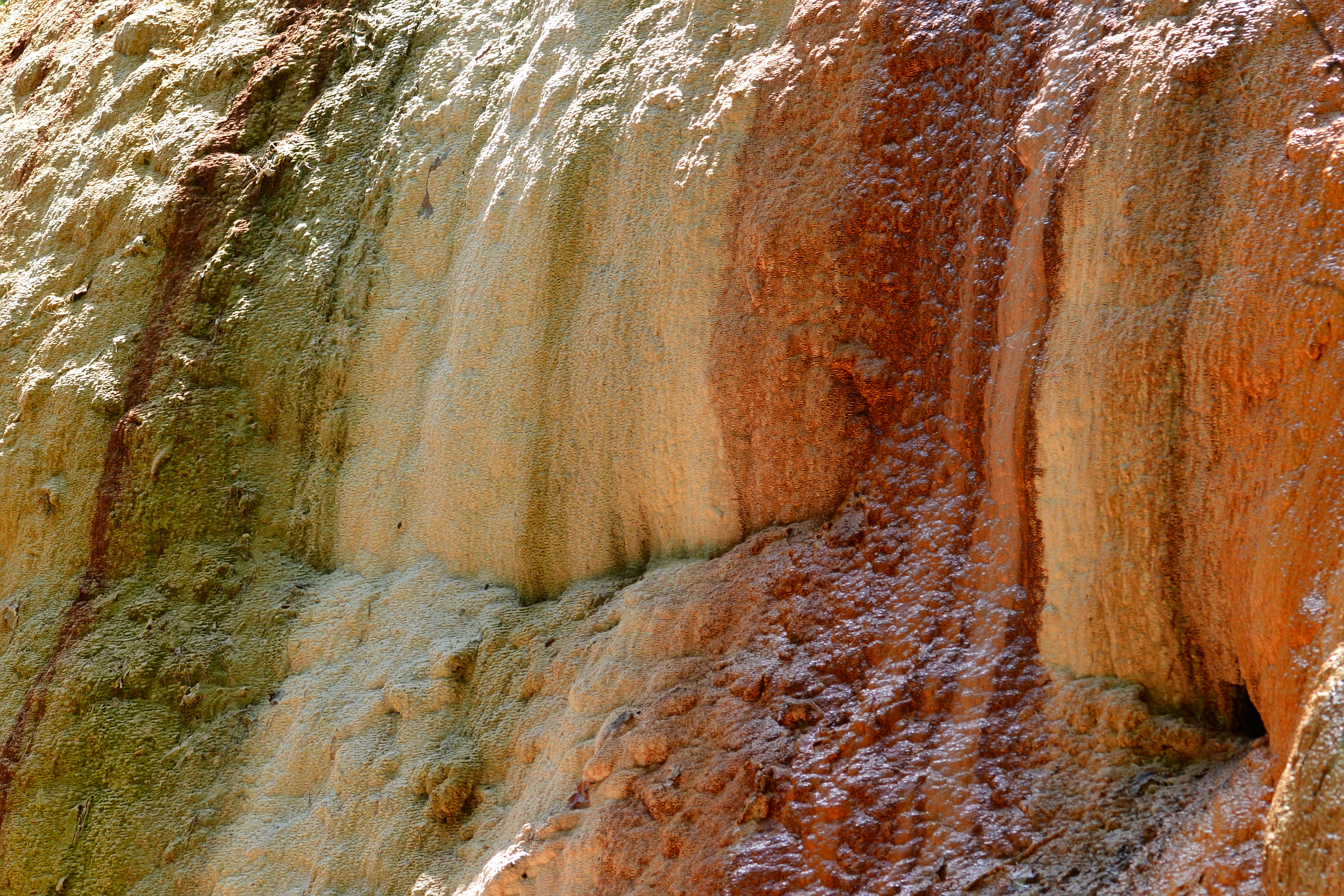
Orenda Spring Tufa Deposits, Saratoga Springs, New York

- Lebanon Springs

== North Carolina ==
- Hot Springs

== Oregon ==
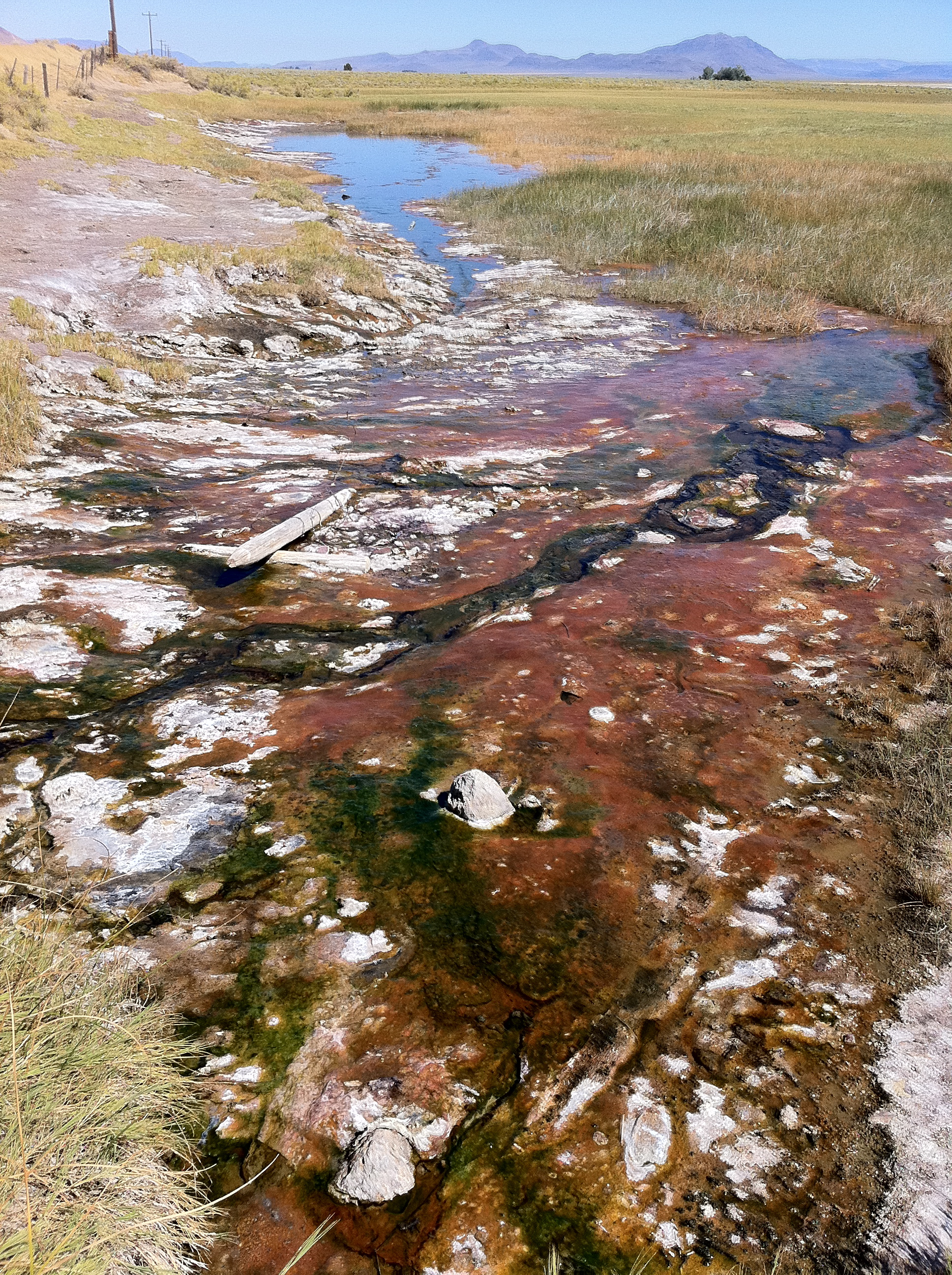
Alvord Hot Springs

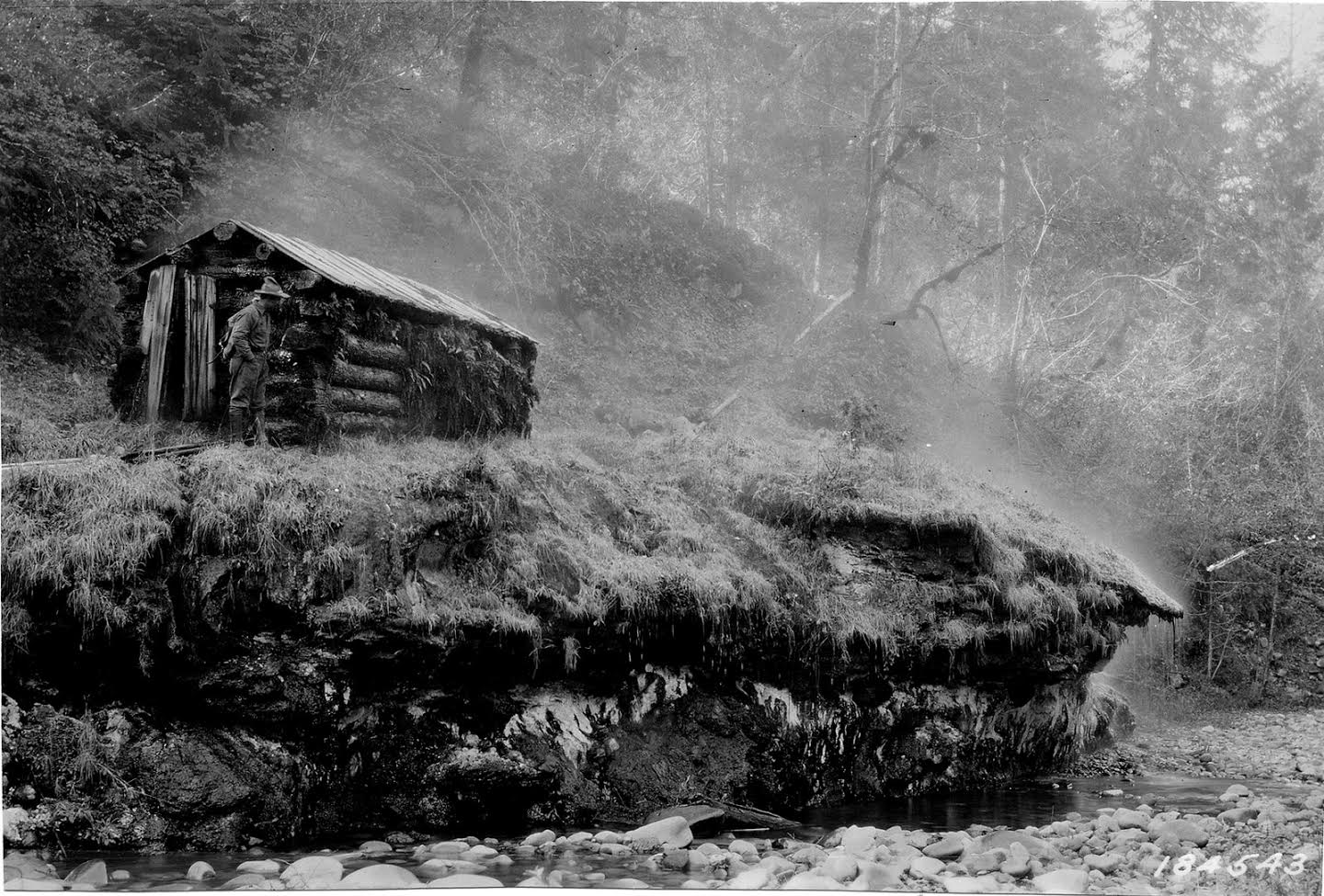
Bath House on Mansfield property, Breitenbush Hot Springs (thermal mineral springs)

- Alvord Hot Springs
- Antelope Hot Springs
- Bagby Hot Springs
- Belknap Hot Springs
- Breitenbush Hot Springs (thermal mineral springs)
- Deer Creek Hot Springs
- Hot Lake Springs
- Hunters Hot Springs
- McCredie Hot Springs
- Mickey Hot Springs
- Summer Lake Hot Springs
- Terwilliger Hot Springs, also known as Cougar Hot Springs
- Umpqua Hot Springs

== South Dakota ==
- Hot Springs

== Texas ==
- Chinati Hot Springs, also known as Ruidosa Hot Springs and Kingston Hot Springs
- Hot Springs (Big Bend National Park)
- Hot Wells (San Antonio, Texas)

== Utah ==
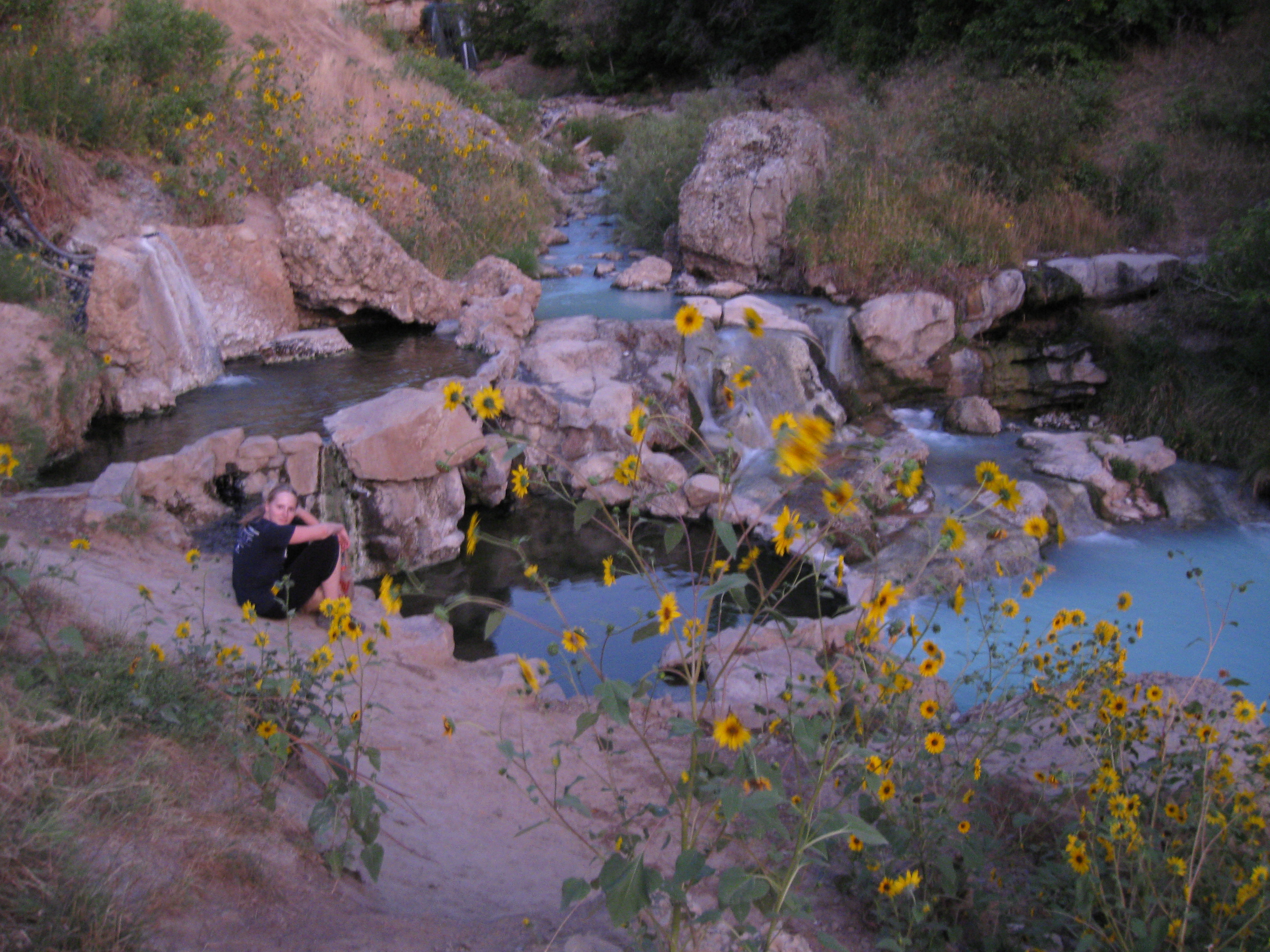
Fifth Water Hot Springs

- Baker Hot Springs, also known as Crater Spring and Abraham Hot Springs
- Blue Lake, Wendover
- Homestead, Midway
- Meadow Hot Springs
- Mystic Hot Springs, also known as Monroe Hot Springs and Cooper Hot Springs
- Saratoga Springs
- Stinking Hot Springs

== Virginia ==
- Hot Springs
- Warm Springs

== Washington ==
- Gamma Hot Springs
- Goldmyer Hot Springs
- Hot Springs, Washington
- Olympic Hot Springs
- Scenic Hot Springs
- Sol Duc Hot Springs

== West Virginia ==
- Berkeley Springs State Park

== Wyoming ==
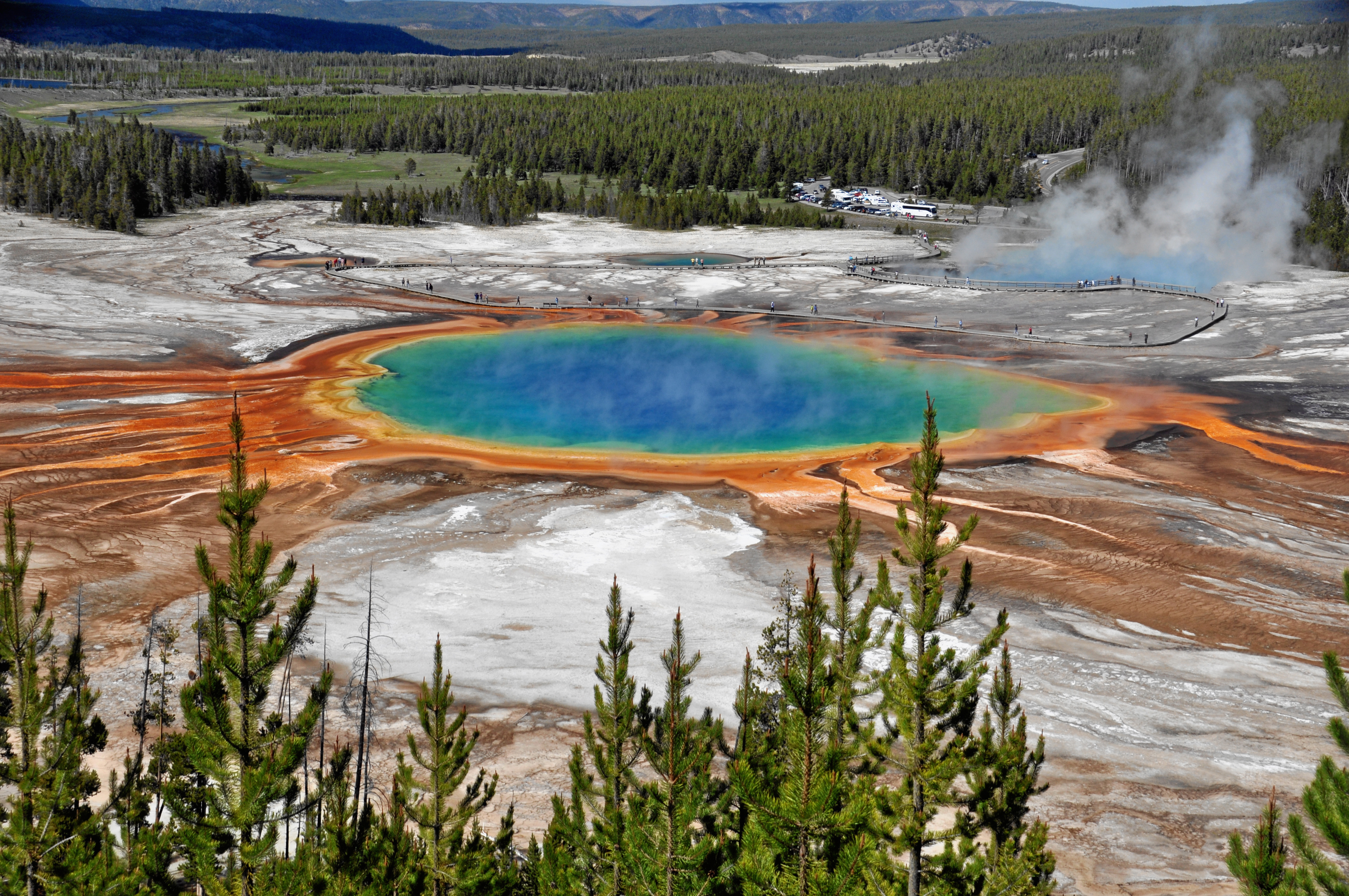
Grand Prismatic Spring 2013, Yellowstone National Park

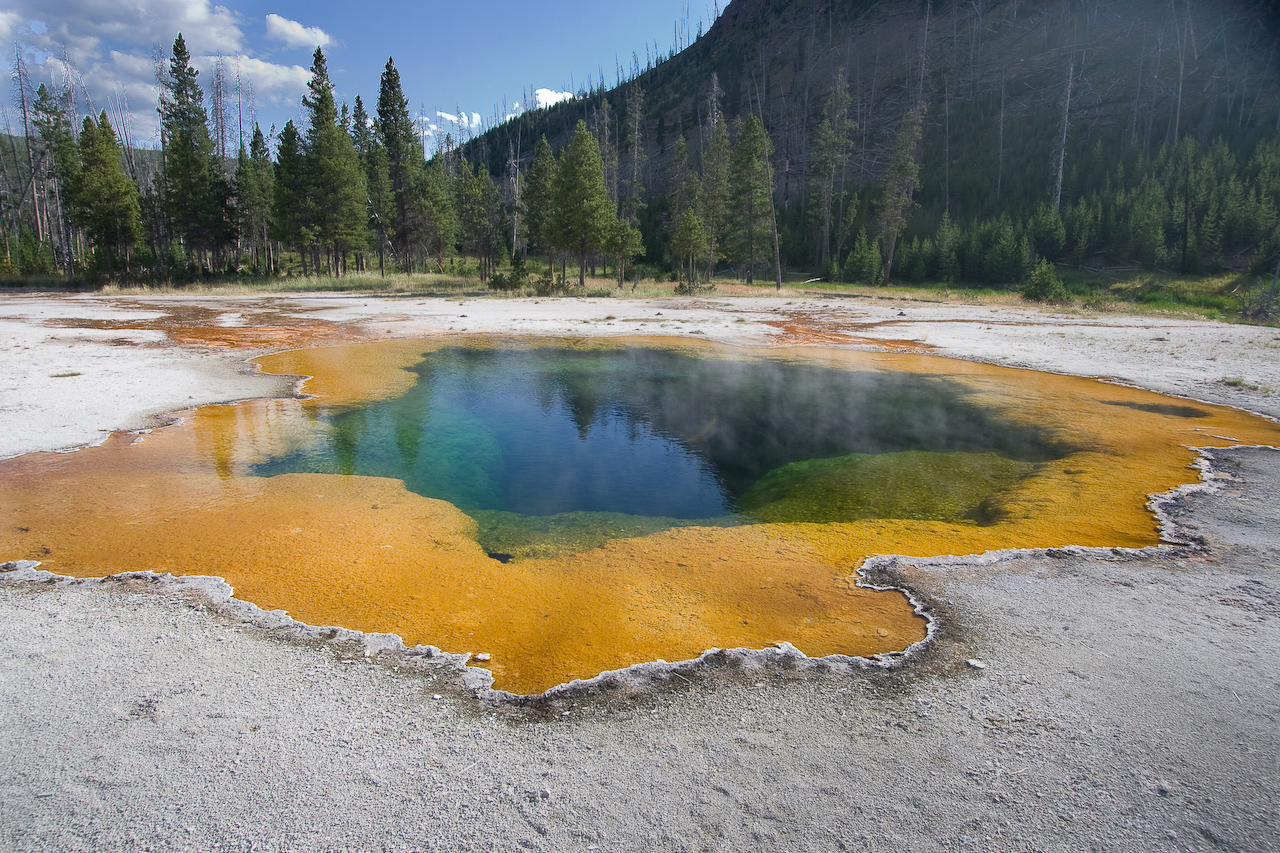
Black Sand Basin

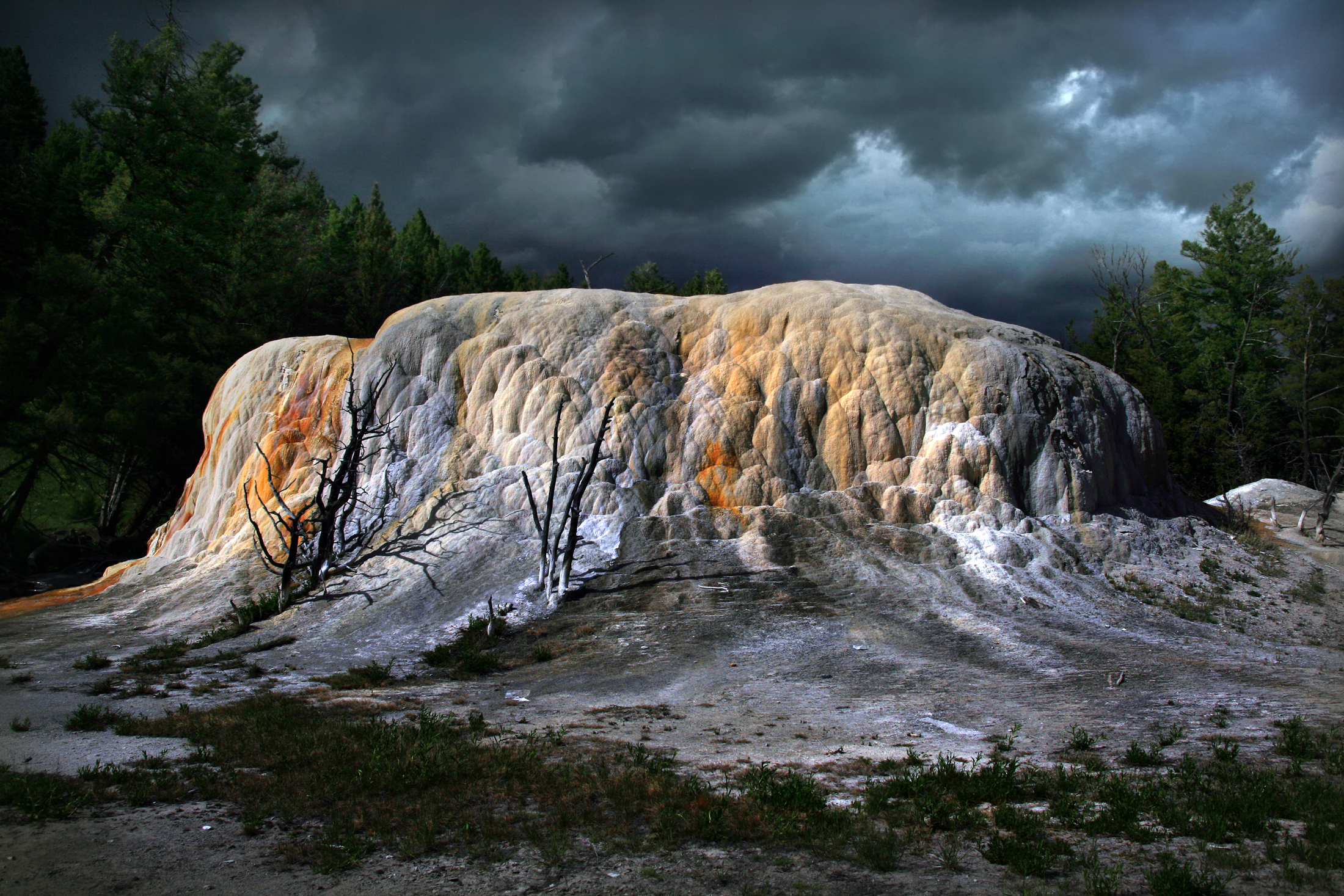
Orange Spring Mound at Mammoth Hot Springs

- Ferris Fork Hot Springs
- Granite Falls Hot Springs
- Hot Springs State Park, Thermopolis
- Huckleberry Hot Springs
- Saratoga
- Yellowstone National Park
  - Black Sand Basin Hot Springs
  - Grand Prismatic Spring
  - Mammoth Hot Springs
  - Washburn Hot Springs

== See also ==
- List of hot springs of the world
- List of artesian wells in the United States
