= Russian Valley Hot Springs =

Thermal springs in Baja California, Mexico

Russian Valley Hot Springs Valle de Guadalupe Hot Springs
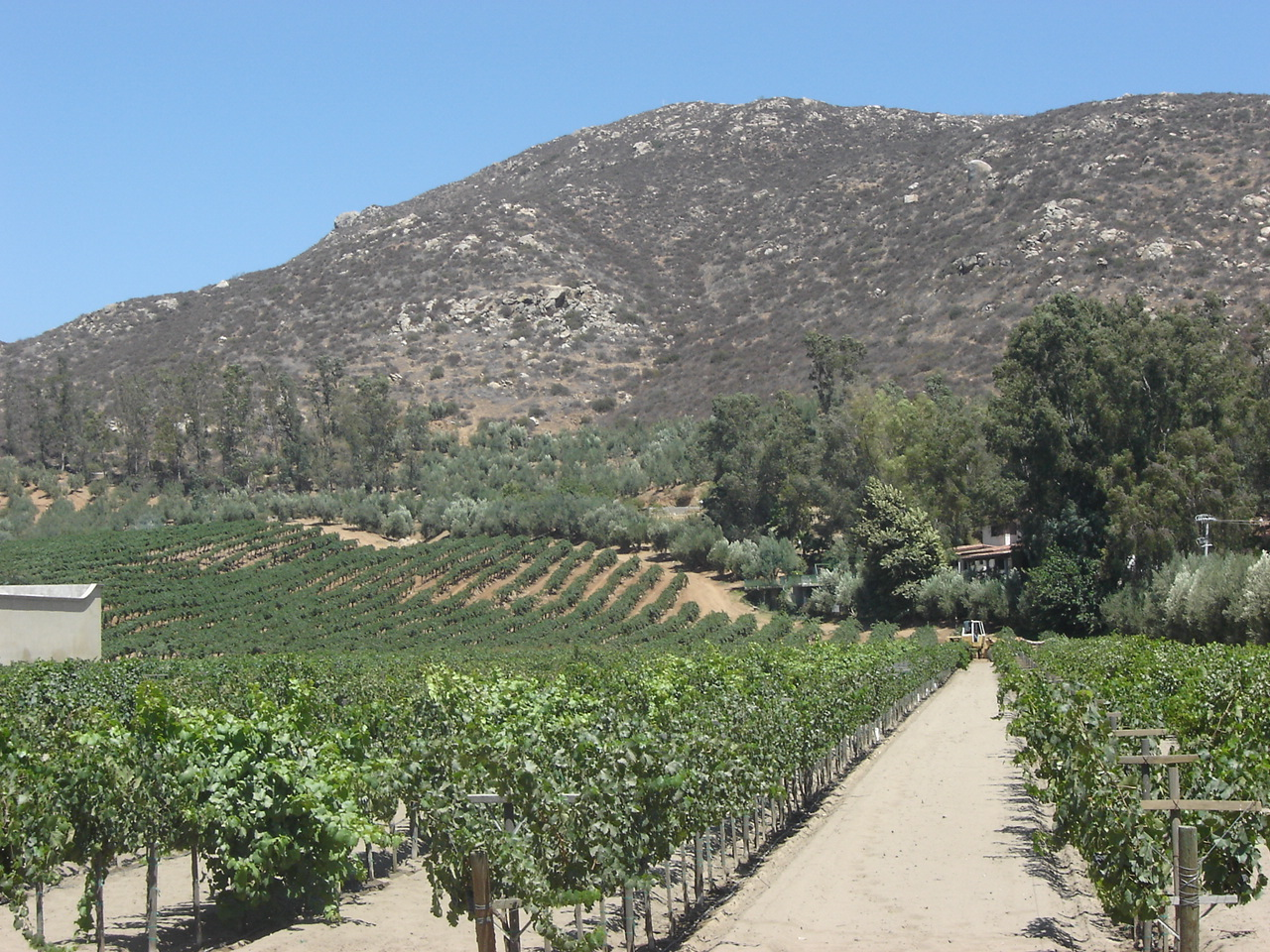
- Viniculture in the Valle de Guadalupe
- Interactive map of Russian Valley Hot Springs; Valle de Guadalupe Hot Springs
- Location: South of Tecate, Baja California
- Coordinates: 32°06′27″N 116°27′15″W
- Elevation: 1,500 ft (460 m)
- Type: Geothermal spring
- Temperature: 125 °F (52 °C)

Russian Valley Hot Springs, also known as Valle de Guadalupe Hot Springs is a group of hot mineral springs near a historic Russian settlement in the Guadalupe Valley of Baja California, Mexico.

== History ==
The Valle de Guadalupe was originally occupied by the Kumeyaay people, many of whom still live on rancherias there today.

The hot springs are named for the group of Russians who settled in the Guadalupe Valley. These religious people of the Prygun faith (spirit jumpers), separated from the Eastern Orthodox Church. They referred to themselves as Molokans (milk drinkers), although the local people called them Los Russos (the Russians). They abstained from eating pork, the use of tobacco, and alcohol. The Molokans first settled in the area near Los Angeles before moving to the Guadalupe Valley in Mexico for ranching, farming. Although they abstained from wine drinking, they practiced viniculture. The area is known for its wine.

== Location ==
The springs are located fifty miles south of Tecate, near the town of Guadalupe in the Ensenada region at 1,500 feet (460 m) elevation. A waterfall is close to the hot springs. There are ruins located near the hot springs.

== Water profile ==
The hot mineral water emerges from the ground from two main springs at 125 °F (52 °C), bubbling up from the sandy bottoms of the primitive rock pools. Another hot spring emerges from a sandy bank, this pool's temperature can be regulated by moving rocks to let in cold creek water. This, and evaporation cool the water to 108 to 110 °F (42 to 43 °C).

== See also ==
- List of hot springs in the United States
- List of hot springs in the world
