= Chinati Hot Springs =

Thermal springs in Texas, United States

- Ruidosa Hot Springs; Kingston Hot Springs
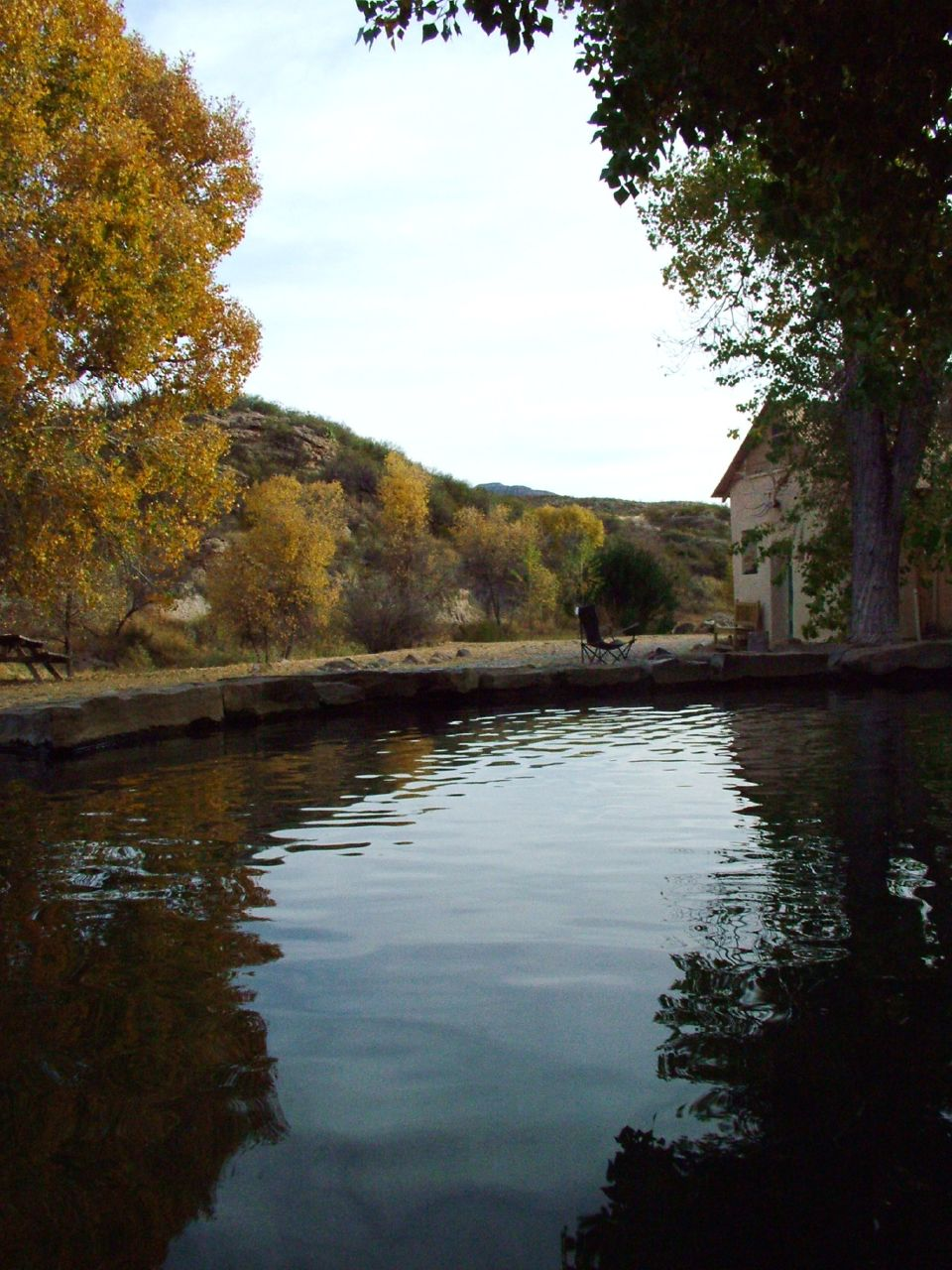

- Location within Texas Location within the United States
- Interactive map of Chinati Hot Springs
- Location: near Presidio, Texas
- Coordinates: 30°2′16.8″N 104°35′52.8″W
- Elevation: 3,500 feet (1,100 m)
- Type: Geothermal spring
- Discharge: 75 US gal/min (280 L/min)
- Temperature: 113 °F (45 °C)

Chinati Hot Springs, also known as Ruidosa Hot Springs and Kingston Hot Springs, are volcanic thermal springs and historical oasis located north of Ruidosa, Texas, in the Big Bend region of the Chihuahuan Desert, near the town of Presidio.

== Water profile ==
The hot mineral water emerges from the spring at 113 °F / 45 °C. The water contains minerals that allegedly help conditions such as arthritis, skin problems and stomach ulcers. Mineral content includes aluminum, antimony, arsenic, barium, beryllium, boron, cadmium, chromium, cobalt, copper, iron, lead, lithium, manganese, molybdenum, nickel, nitrate, selenium, strontium, thallium, tritium, vanadium, and zinc.

== Geography ==
The hot springs are situated in the northeast section of the Presidio Bolson ten feet above Hot Springs Creek, and emerge from Quaternary terrace gravels. The springs are located between two forks of the Candelaria fault. A volcanic Tertiary rock outcrop plunges towards the spring.

== History ==
The hot mineral waters were used by Native Americans for hundreds of years, and later by early settlers in the area.

In 1896 the springs and the surrounding 1,200 acres were acquired by Annie Kingston and her husband, Bill. In 1937 they built a bathhouse and seven cabins, and named the facility Kingston Hot Springs, developing it into a public rustic resort with horse-trough soaking tubs. Later the property was managed by Bill Kingston's sister, Bea Paul and her cousins.

In 1990, the springs were purchased by the artist, Donald Judd who closed the springs from public access into private use only by him and his friends. In 1997, The photographer, Richard Fenker, purchased the springs from the Judd estate, and returned it to its former public-access status. Fenker formed a not-for-profit corporation for the property, and set up workshops on medicinal plants of the deserts of the Southwest, desert photography, among other topics. In 2005 the property was purchased by Jeff Fort III who further developed the site and created a policy restricting public use only to paying guests of their accommodations.

== Location ==
The springs are located at 30°2′16.8″ N 104°35′52.8″ W in the Big Bend region of Texas.

== See also ==
- List of hot springs in the United States
- List of hot springs in the world
