= Verde Hot Springs =

Thermal springs in Yavapai County, Arizona

- Camp Verde Hot Springs
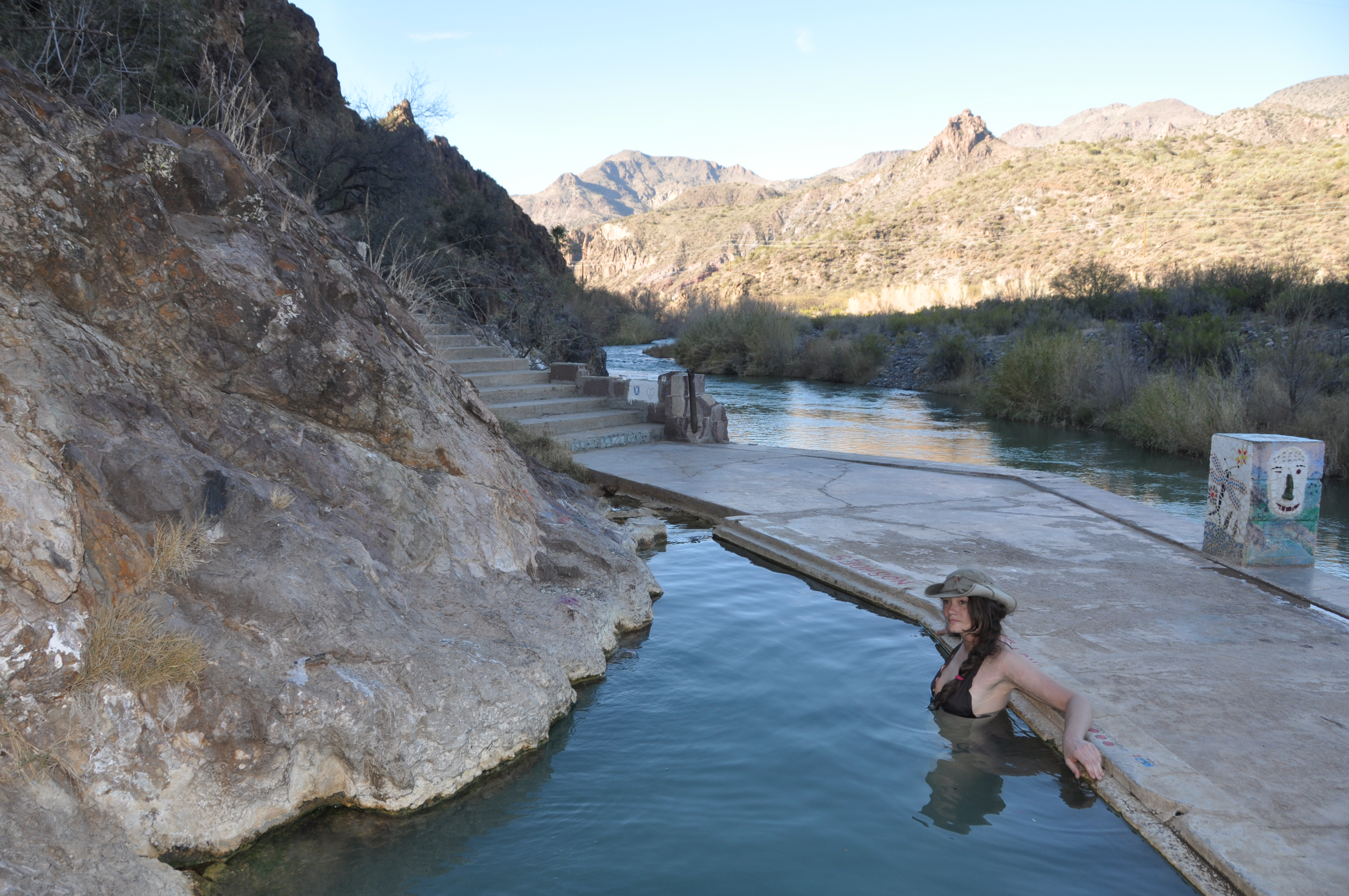
- Verde Hot Springs
- Interactive map of Verde Hot Springs
- Coordinates: 34°21′25″N 111°42′36″W
- Elevation: 2,800 ft (850 m)
- Type: geothermal spring
- Temperature: 104 °F (40 °C)

Verde Hot Springs is a grouping of thermal mineral springs near the town of Camp Verde in Yavapai County, Arizona. The springs are located at the western bank of the Verde River. There are ruins of a former historical resort at the site and bathhouse.

== History ==
The local Native Americans used the hot mineral springs for centuries before the arrival of early settlers. Indigenous people used thermal springs in the American Southwest for thousands of years, per archaeological evidence of human use and settlement by Paleo-Indians. These geothermal resources provided warmth, healing mineral water, and cleansing.

There was an extensive resort with a hotel built in 1920s. It burned to the ground in 1962. It was called the Verde Hot Springs Hotel and was built by Floyd Williams and his son Floyd Jr. Some of the foundations still exist onsite. In addition to the main pool (near the ruins) there are several smaller rock pools downstream, these range in temperature from 92° to 104 °F.

== Water profile ==
The hot water emerges from several springs along the river bank, and a cave at 104 °F/40C. Mineral content includes boron, calcium, iron, lithium, magnesium, sodium, rubidium, and cesium. In 1960, The New York Times described the water as sulfur-impregnated and that they were "favored by Indians for their curative powers." Health seekers in the early 20th century used the hot spring water to relieve arthritis, sinusitis and rheumatism.

== See also ==
- List of hot springs in the United States
- List of hot springs in the world
