= Pumpkin Spring =

Thermal spring in the Grand Canyon, Arizona

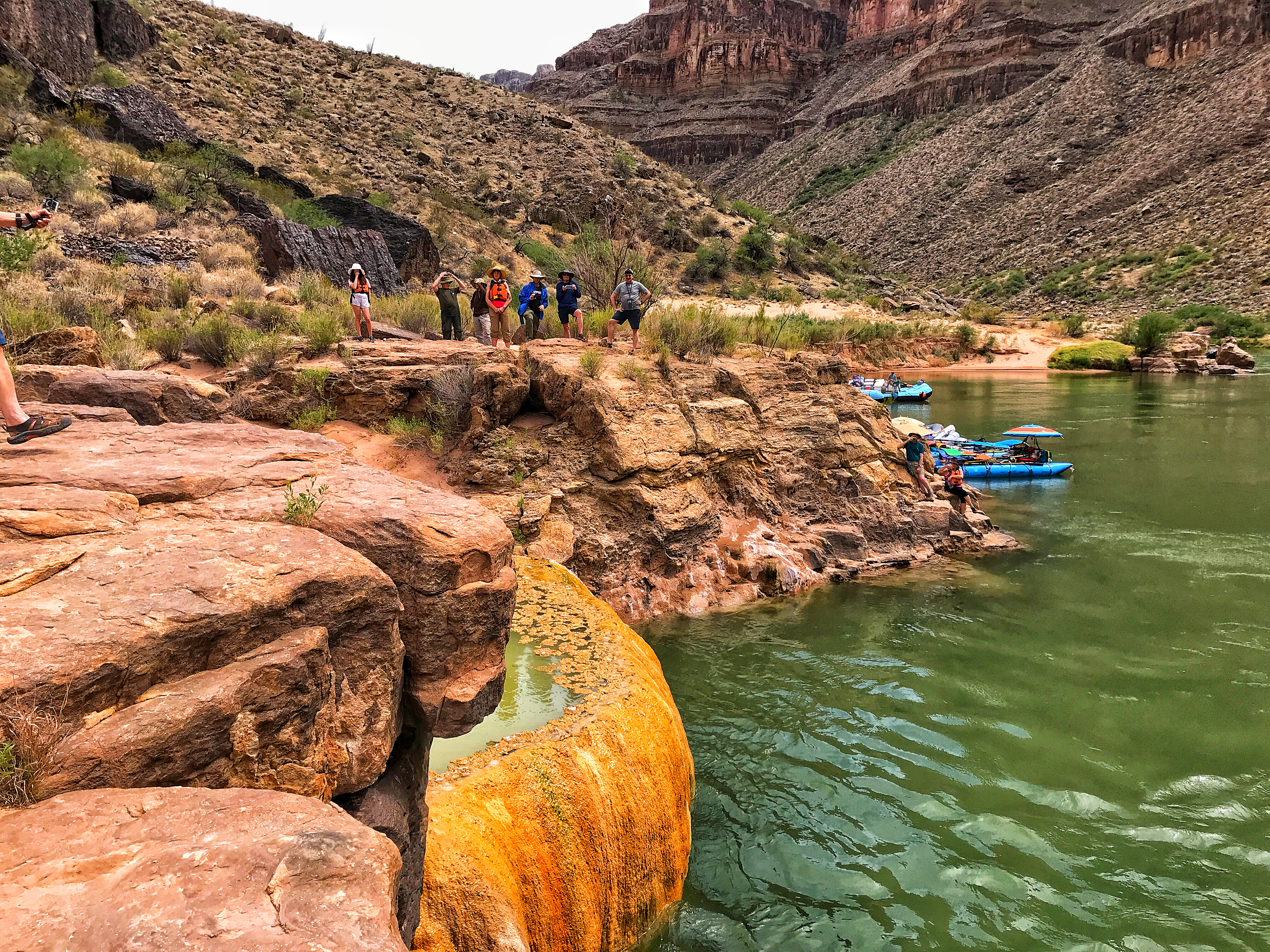
- Pumpkin Hot Spring (source at left of image)
- Interactive map of Pumpkin Spring
- Location: Grand Canyon
- Coordinates: 35°54′58″N 113°20′03″W
- Elevation: 480 ft (150 m)
- Discharge: 200 mL/s
- Temperature: 23 °C (73 °F)

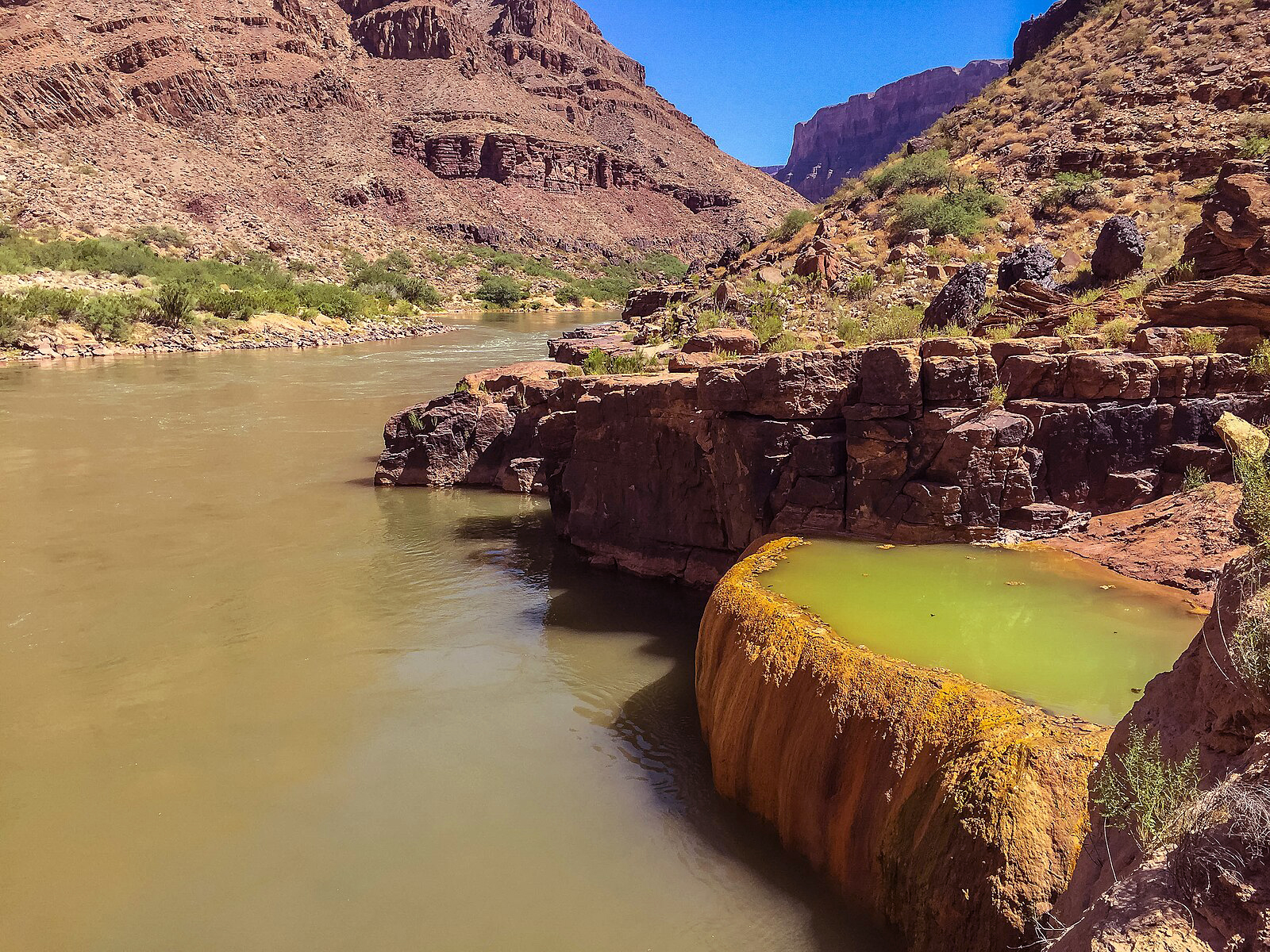
Pumpkin Spring in the Grand Canyon along the Colorado River in Arizona

Pumpkin Spring is a geothermal heated mineral water hot spring located in the Grand Canyon in Arizona.

The spring gets its name due to the bright orange mineral and organic deposits that have accumulated on the flowstone, giving it the appearance of a huge pumpkin. At the surface, the spring morphology is a mineralized carbonate mound-form.

The spring water flows from within the pool which is surrounded by a travertine that has formed around the source. The water flows over the left bank lip of the mound down to the river at the upstream end of pool into the downstream side of the river.

== Water profile ==
The hot spring water that emerges from a mineralized carbonate mound has a mineral content that includes high levels of arsenic (1100 mg per 1 liter of water), as well as zinc, lead, and copper. The temperature of the water emerges at 23 °C, at a rate of 200 milliliters per second, and has a pH of 7.0.

The hot spring and associated collection pool contains some of the most poisonous water in the Grand Canyon. Soaking in this hot spring water is discouraged; it is prohibited to drink from this spring due to the level of arsenic.

== Location ==
The spring is located at the bottom of the Grand Canyon near the shore of the Colorado River near mile 212.9.

== See also ==
- List of hot springs in the United States
- List of hot springs in the world
