= Roper Lake State Park Hot Spring =

Thermal spring in Graham County, Arizona

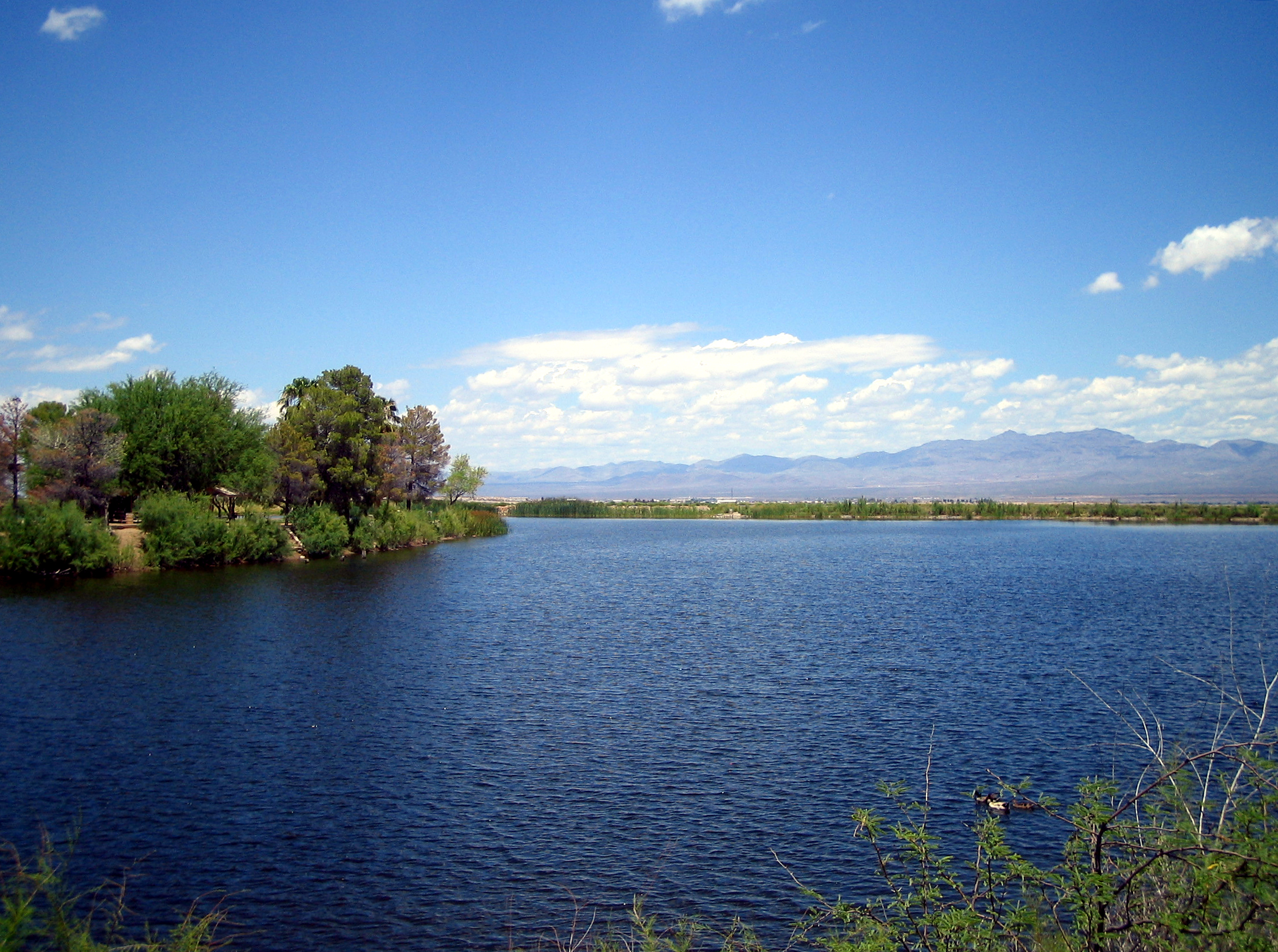
- Roper Lake
- Interactive map of Roper Lake State Park Hot Spring
- Location: Safford, Arizona
- Coordinates: 32.753°N 109.708°W
- Elevation: 3,100 ft (940 m)
- Type: hot artesian well
- Temperature: 99 °F (37 °C)

Roper Lake State Park Hot Spring is a single geothermal mineral spring in Roper Lake State Park, Safford, Arizona.

== Water profile ==
The hot mineral water emerges from the ground at 99 °F.

== Location ==
The hot springs are located in the State Park which offers camping, cabins, swimming, hiking and fishing. They are handicapped accessible, with railings, and one can drive a vehicle up to the spring. About eight people can fit in the single rock and concrete pool.

== See also ==
- List of hot springs in the United States
- List of hot springs in the world
