= Gold Strike Hot Springs =

Thermal spring

- Goldstrike Hot Springs; Nevada Hot Springs; Gold Strike Canyon Hot Springs
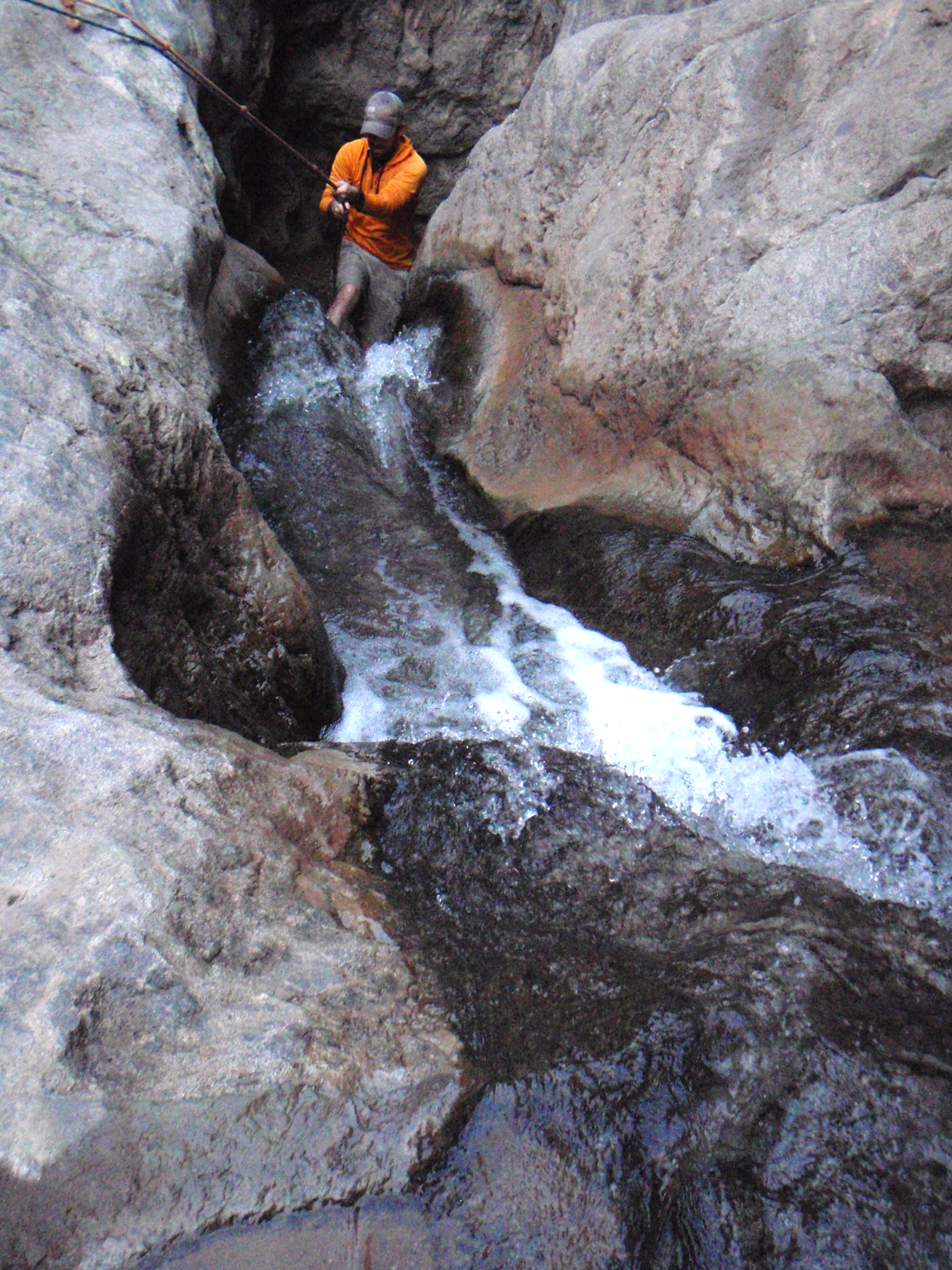
- Canyoneering by rope in hot spring water
- Interactive map of Gold Strike Hot Springs
- Location: near Boulder City, Arizona/Nevada border
- Coordinates: 35°59′58″N 114°44′33″W
- Elevation: 1,561 ft (476 m)
- Type: Geothermal spring water seeps in cliff face
- Temperature: 109 °F (43 °C)

Gold Strike Hot Springs, also known as Goldstrike Hot Springs, Nevada Hot Springs and Gold Strike Canyon Hot Springs are a group of hot springs near Hoover Dam on the Arizona/Nevada border near historic Boulder City. They are in the Lake Mead National Recreation Area.

== History ==
Indigenous people used hot springs throughout the American Southwest for thousands of years, based on archaeological evidence of human use and settlement by Paleo-Indians. Thermal springs provided warmth, healing mineral water, and cleansing.

== Geology and geography ==
The geothermally heated spring water seeps out of the cliffs in Gold Strike Canyon, and collects in a series of primitive rock soaking pools. The series of collecting pools go for approximately two miles along the canyon. The canyon has been known for flash floods. The pluton is exposed in Gold Strike Canyon, with volcanic breccias, multiple faults and dike intrusions. The hot springs emanate from the termination of the Palm Tree fault, where it meets the Salt Cedar fault zone. The spring discharge is abundant and includes gypsum encrustations and a carbonate spring mound. This fault zone is significant, as it is the area where there are significant changes in the isotopic and chemical make up of the groundwater discharged in the springs.

The hike to the hot springs is difficult and requires technical equipment such as ropes and ascending and descending gear. There have been a number of fatalities (mostly from heat exposure) in the Canyon, including two hikers who died on one day in June 2003. Although the trail was previously open year-round, in 2016 the National Park Service closed the trail in summer months (generally May 15 – Sept. 30) due to dangers from extreme heat. To reach the hot springs from the trail, one encounters a series of eight difficult rope descents. After the descent, hikers reach a series of hot spring soaking pools, hot waterfalls and grottos.

== Water profile ==
The water emerges from the cliffs at 109 °F (43 °C), and as they collect in the pools, the temperatures range from 98 to 110 °F (37 to 43 °C). Near the first waterfall on the trail is a sand and gravel-bottomed rock pool at 100 °F (38 °C).

== Location ==
The springs are located on the Arizona/Nevada border at an elevation of 1,561 feet (476 m).

== See also ==
- List of hot springs in the United States
- List of hot springs in the world
