= Hopkins Hot Springs =

Thermal Spring

- Maple Grove Hot Springs
- Interactive map of Hopkins Hot Springs
- Coordinates: 42°18′48″N 111°42′42″W
- Type: geothermal
- Temperature: 172 °F (78 °C)

Hopkins Hot Springs, also known as Maple Grove Hot Springs, is a thermal spring located along the Bear River near Thatcher, Idaho.

== History ==
Prior to the arrival of settlers, the hot springs were used by the local Shoshone people. The property surrounding the hot springs was homesteaded in the early 1900s by the Hopkins family. In 1945 it became known as Maple Grove Hot Springs and was operated as a commercial facility into the 1960s. In 1999, the Timons family purchased the property. Later it was sold to an intentional community group.

== Water profile ==
The hot mineral water emerges from the source at approximately 172 °F/78 °C and is directed into a cooling pond before being directed into a series of rock-lined soaking pools. The temperature in the pools range between 95 °F – 107 °F.
