= Black Sand Basin Hot Springs =

Thermal springs

Black Sand Basin
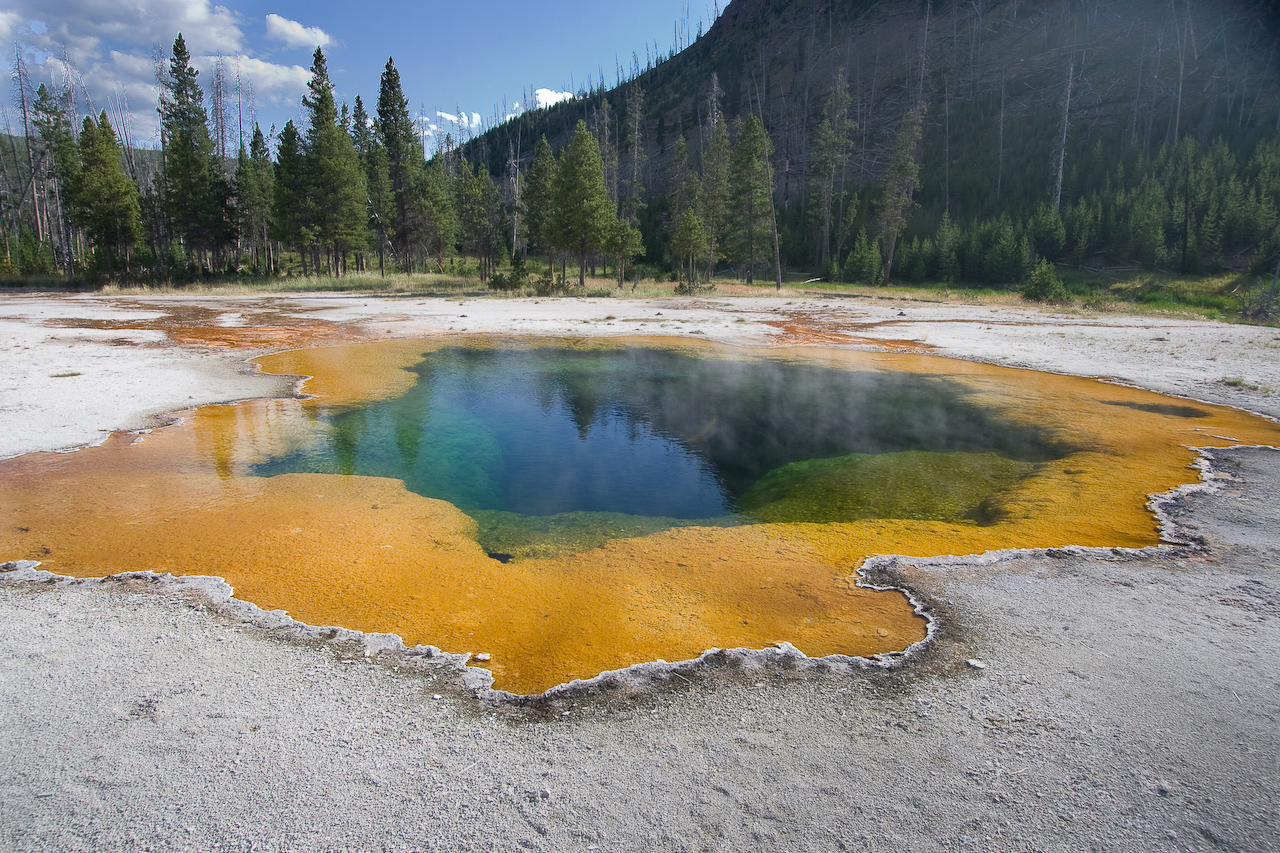
- Emerald Pool at the Black Sand Basin
- Interactive map of Black Sand Basin
- Location: Yellowstone National Park
- Coordinates: 44.4628°N 110.8547°W
- Elevation: 7,292
- Type: Volcanic geothermal spring
- Discharge: 33 gallons per minute
- Temperature: 201 °F (94 °C)

Black Sand Basin is one of a grouping of geothermal hot springs and geysers located in the Upper Geyser Basin of Yellowstone National Park, Wyoming. The spring is too hot to use as a mineral bath as its scalding 200 °F (93 °C) or hotter water has proven to be fatal. In the winter, a marked ski trail runs from the Old Faithful Visitor Center to Black Sand Basin

== Geography ==
The area is named for its obsidian black sand that covers much of the basin. Hot springs in the Black Sand Basin are Emerald Pool 154.6 °F (68.1 °C), Rainbow Pool 161 °F (72 °C), Sunset Lake 180 °F (82 °C), Opalescent Pool 144 °F (62 °C) and Green Spring. Cliff Geyser 191.8 °F (88.8 °C) and Spouter Geyser 199.9 °F (93.3 °C) are also located in the basin, alongside Iron Spring creek. The basin is located at the base of Rhyolite Cliffs.

== History ==
Black Sand Basin was originally called the Emerald Group, a name given to it by A. C. Peale in 1878 but tourists started calling it Black Sand Basin and that name stuck. The main draw of the basin used to be "Handkerchief Pool", people would drop a handkerchief in the pool, currents would carry it away, and after a short time it would rise back to the surface, freshly cleaned.

== Gallery ==
Video of Cliff Geyser erupting

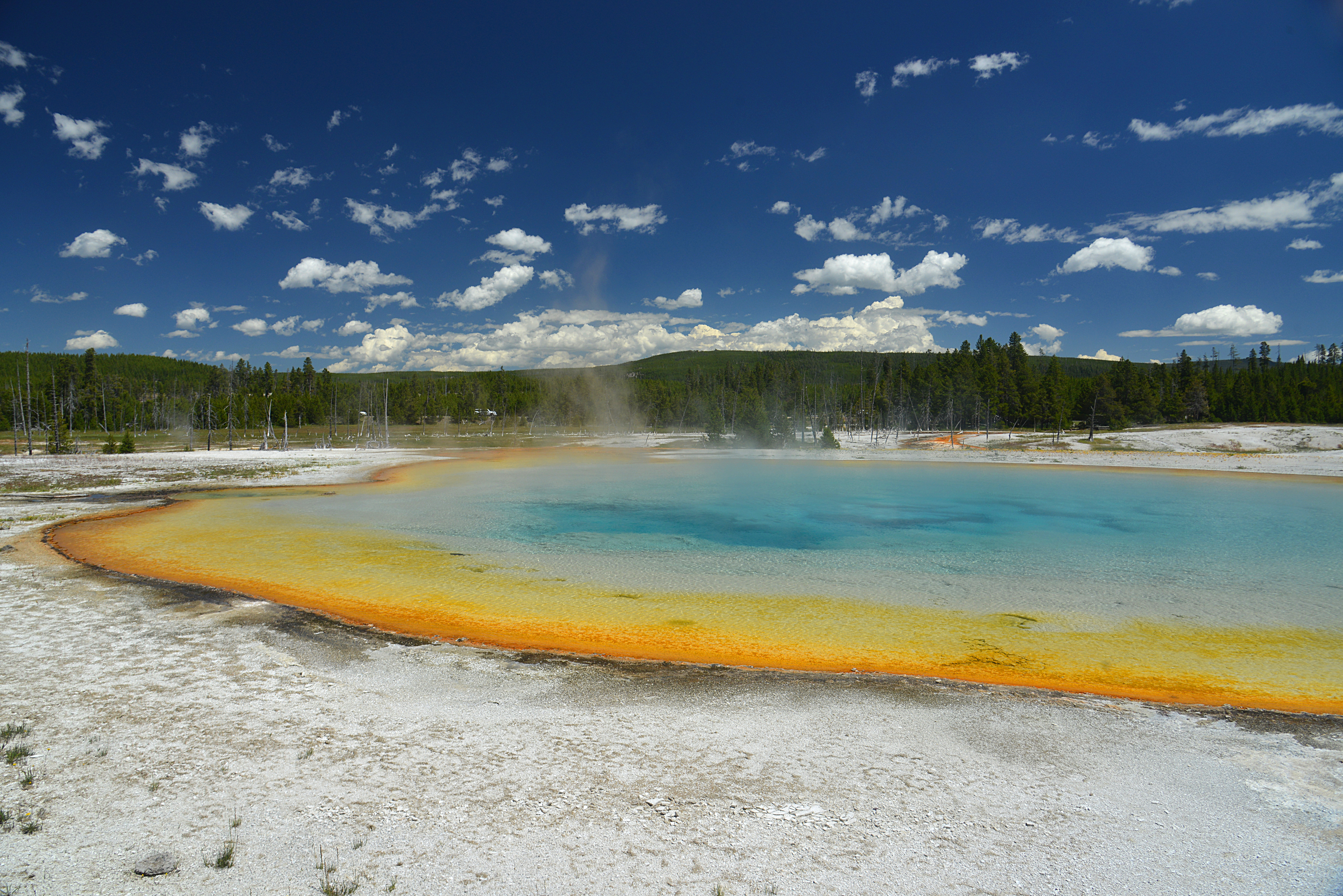
Sunset Lake

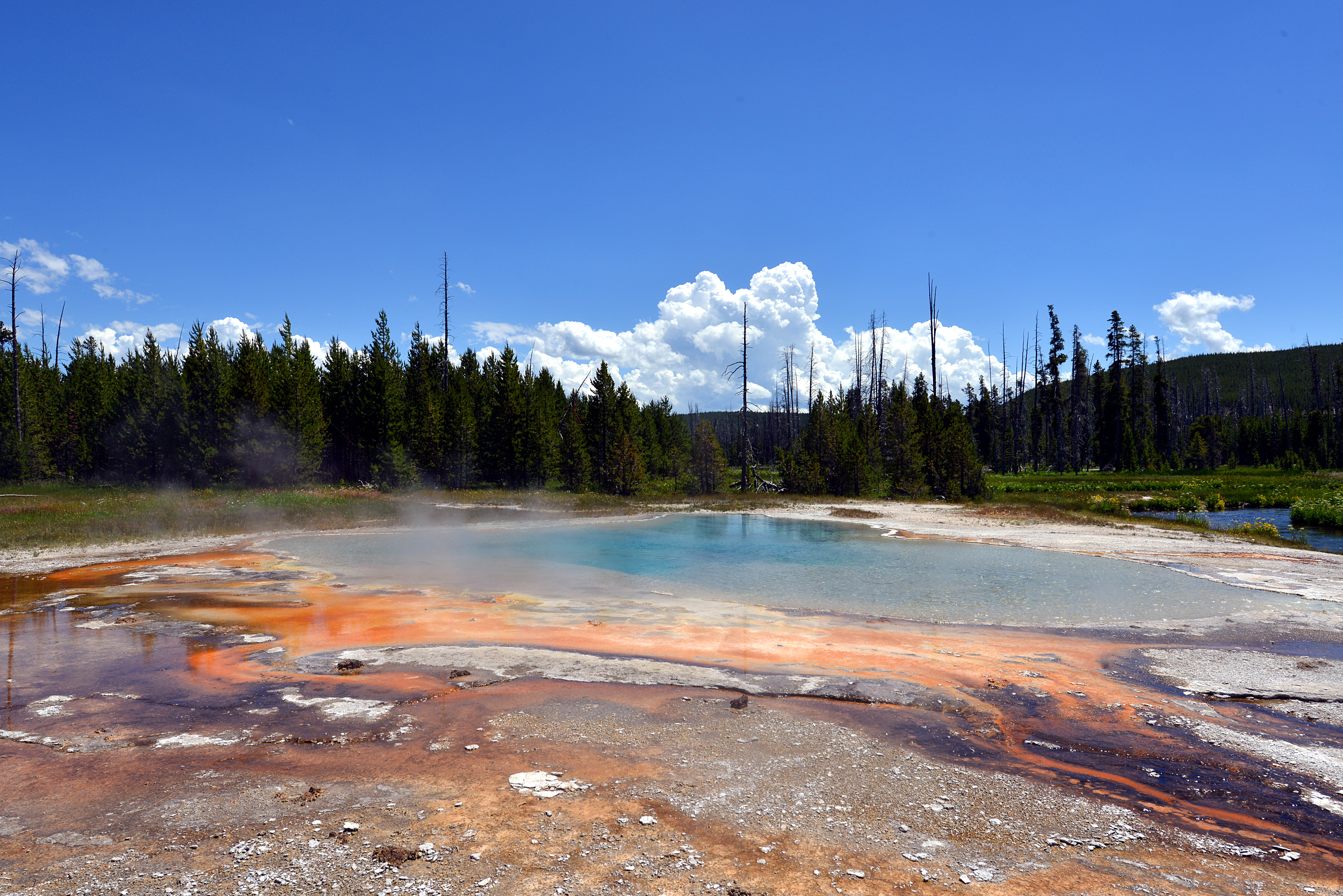
Green Spring

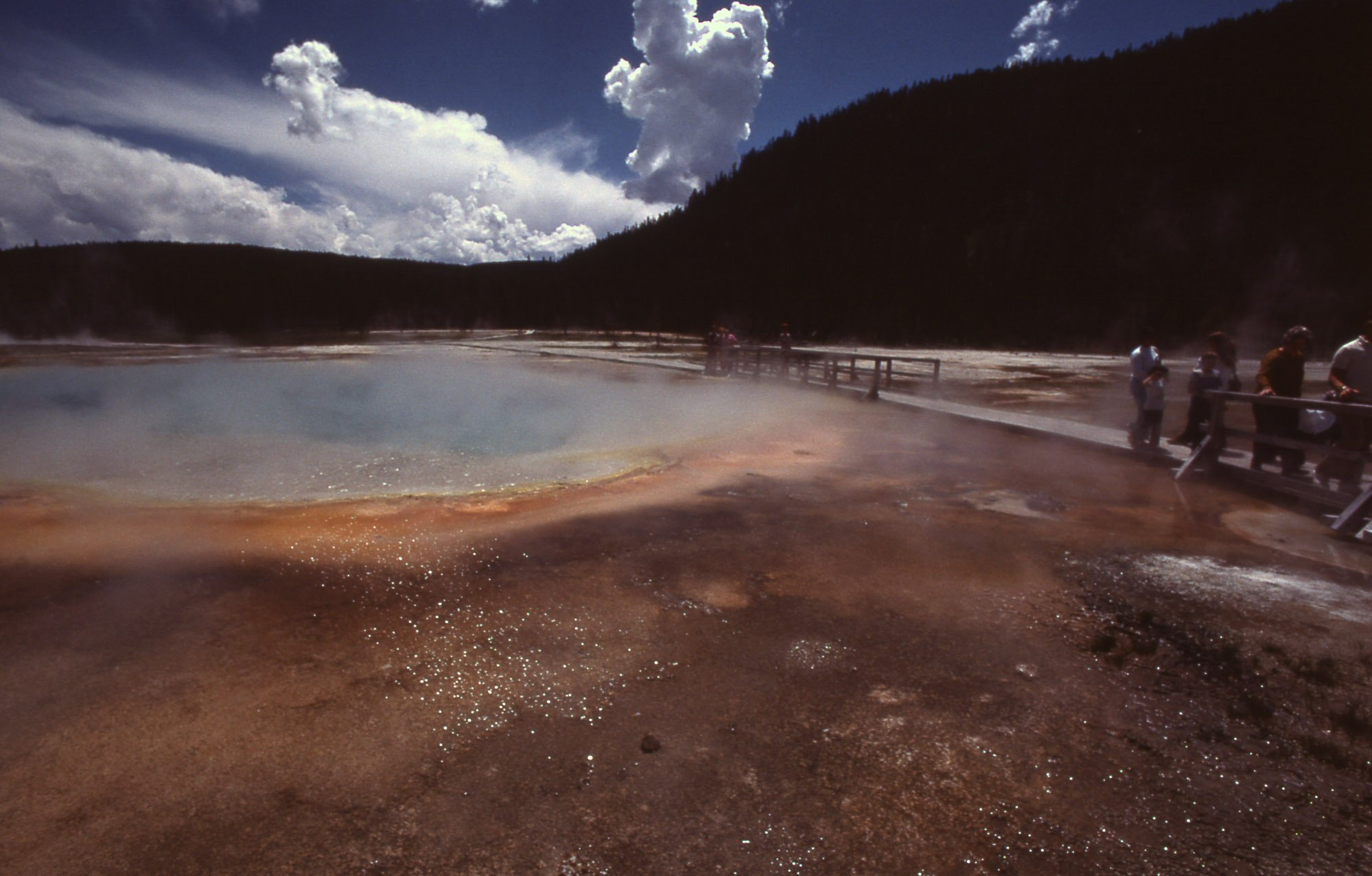
Rainbow Pool

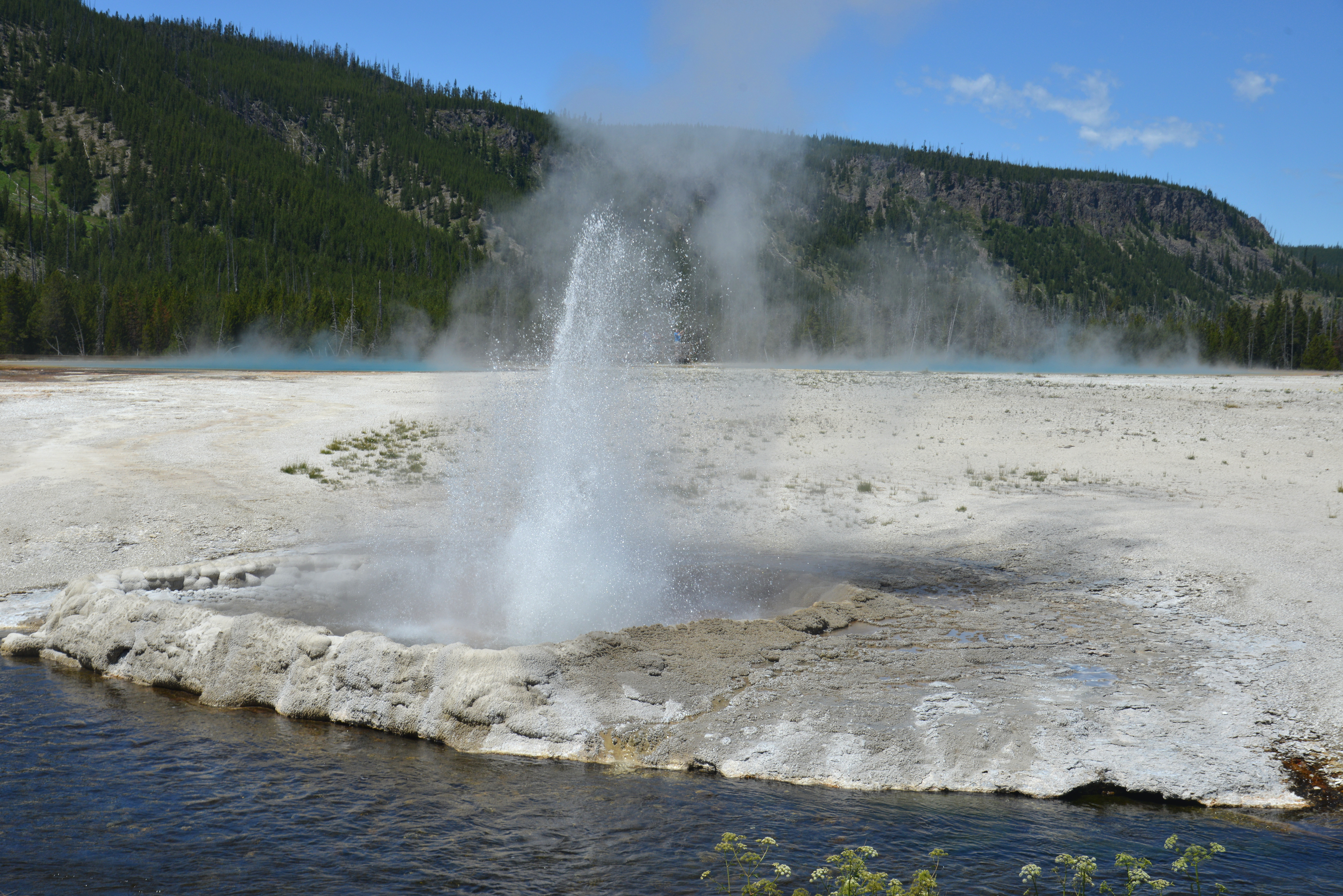
Cliff Geyser Erupting

== See also ==
- Geothermal areas of Yellowstone
- List of hot springs in the United States
- List of hot springs in the world
