= Smith Creek (Lander County, Nevada) =

Creek in Nevada

Coordinates: 39°20′28″N 117°30′04″W

Smith Creek is a stream in the U.S. state of Nevada.

Smith Creek was named in 1859 after a family which settled near its course. A variant name is "Smiths Creek".
