= Deer Creek Hot Springs =

Thermal spring

Coordinates: 44.24113°N 122.05881°W

Deer Creek Hot Springs (also known as Bigelow Hot Springs) is a hot spring along the McKenzie River in the Cascade Range of western Oregon, United States.

The thermal pools usually have a rock ring providing 1 to 2 feet (30 to 61 cm) of depth over coarse sand and measure about 8 by 13 feet (2.4 by 4.0 m). When the McKenzie river is high (winter and spring), the pools are combined into a single pool and inundated with cold water. The spring emerges at 104 °F (40 °C) from a shallow overhanging cave. The springs are located south of the McKenzie River Bridge, in a fee-free day-use area open from sunrise to sunset.
