= Hot Well Dunes =

Thermal spring

- Hotwell Dunes Hot Springs
- Location within Arizona
- Interactive map of Hot Well Dunes
- Location: within Hot Well Dunes Recreation Area
- Coordinates: 32°31′24″N 109°25′35″W
- Elevation: 3,450 ft (1,050 m)
- Type: geothermal
- Discharge: 200 gallons per minute
- Temperature: 106 °F (41 °C)

Hot Well Dunes is a hot spring in the San Simeon Valley of Arizona, located on BLM land southeast of the town of Safford.

== Description ==
Hot Well Dunes are a series of artesian hot spring wells that are surrounded by 2000 acres of open BLM land. Camping is permitted at the site for a maximum stay of two weeks. There are two main soaking pools surrounded by a low metal fence and gate, cement benches; pit toilets are available on site. The two main pools overflow into a large rock-lined pool, the temperature is lukewarm. The site is surrounded by desert views. There is no trash pick-up at the site, and all trash must be removed by visitors to the hot springs. There are also more primitive soaking areas on-site surrounded by cattails that also provide habitat for wildlife and fish.

== Location ==
Hot Well Dunes are located on BLM land in a remote location the San Simon Valley, far away from any cities or towns.

== History ==
The hot springs were discovered in the late 1920s in this remote area as a during an oil exploration drilling operation. Remnants of the rusted drilling equipment can still be found in the area.

== Water profile ==
The geothermally heated mineral water emerges from the source at a temperature of 106 °F at a rate of 250 gallons per minute.
