= Campbell Hot Springs, California =

Unincorporated community in California, United States

- Unincorporated community
- Location within California Location within the United States
- Coordinates: 39°34′30″N 120°20′53″W
- Country: United States
- State: California
- County: Sierra
- Elevation: 5,023 ft (1,531 m)
- Time zone: UTC-8 (Pacific (PST))
  - Summer (DST): UTC-7 (PDT)
- Area code: 530
- GNIS feature ID: 1658205

Campbell Hot Springs (also known as Sierra Hot Springs) is a set of springs in Sierra County, California, United States which was turned into a resort in the 1880s. Campbell Hot Springs is 1.5 miles (2.4 km) southeast of Sierraville. The community was founded as a thermal springs resort in the 1880s.

Set in the scenic valley of Sierraville, this hot springs is open to the public year-round and 24/7. The four mains pool in this hot spring are: 1) The Temple Dome warm pool (98-100°), 2) The Hot Pool (105-110°), 3) The Meditation Pool (98-100°), 4) The Phoenix Baths (85-90°). The Temple Dome Pool area also houses a dry sauna.

The property is managed by the Sierra Hot Springs non-profit organization. The pools are clothing optional and family friendly.
