= Thatcher, Idaho =

Unincorporated community in the state of Idaho, United States

Thatcher is an unincorporated community in Franklin County, Idaho, United States. Its elevation is 4,902 feet (1,494 m), and it is located at 42°24′32″N 111°43′37″W. Although Thatcher is unincorporated, it has a post office, with the ZIP code of 83283; the ZCTA for ZIP Code 83283 had a population of 123 at the 2000 census.
