= List of Alaska Wildlife Management Areas =

Alaska Wildlife Management Areas are protected areas in the U.S. state of Alaska. The Alaska Department of Fish and Game (ADF&G), Division of Wildlife Conservation, is tasked with managing Alaska's wildlife. Enforcement is through the Alaska Department of Public Safety Wildlife Troopers.

== Wildlife Management Areas ==
The ADF&G is tasked with managing approximately 750 active fisheries, 5 game management Regions, 26 game management GMU units and subunits, and 32 special areas or state wildlife refuges.

- Region 1: Douglas (Southeast), units 1–5
- Region 2: Anchorage (Southcentral), units 6–8, 14C, & 15
- Region 3: Fairbanks (Interior), units 12, 19–21, 24, 25, 26B, & 26C
- Region 4: Palmer (Central/Southwestern), units 9–11, 13, 14A, 14B, 16, & 17
- Region 5: Nome (Northwest), units 18, 22, 23, & 26A.

=== List of Wildlife Management Areas ===
- Anchorage Management Area (GMU 14C).
- Birchwood Management Area (GMU 14).
- Chugach State Park Management Area (GMU 14C).
- Dalton Highway Corridor Management Area (GMU 20, 24, 25, 26).
- Delta Junction Management Area (GMU 20D).
- Eagle River Management Area (GMU 14C).
- Eklutna Lake Management Area (GMU 14C).
- Fairbanks Management Area (GMU 20B).
- Ferry Trail Management Area (GMU 20A).
- Hatcher Pass Youth Hunt Management Area (GMU 14A).
- Healy-Lignite Management Area (GMU 20A).
- Joint Base Elmendorf-Richardson (JBER) Management Area (GMU 14C).
- Kodiak Road System Management Area (GMU 08).
- Lime Village Management Area (GMU 19E).
- Minto Flats Management Area (GMU 20).
- Palmer-Wasilla Management Area (GMU 14A).
- Petersburg Management Area (GMU 3).
- Point MacKenzie Youth Hunt Management Area (GMU 14A).
- Skilak Loop Wildlife Management Area (GMU 15A).
- Tok Management Area (GMU 12, 13C, 20D).
- Unit 16B Youth Hunt Management Area (GMU 16B).
- Upper Holitna-Hoholitna Management Area (GMU 19B).
- Yakutat Youth Hunt Management Area (GMU 05A).

== State parks ==
The Alaska Department of Natural Resources, Division of Parks and Outdoor Recreation, manages state parks. Enforcement is provided by Wildlife troopers.

== State Forests ==
- Haines State Forest: 286,000 acres (116,000 ha)
- Southeast State Forest
- Tanana Valley State Forest

== National Wildlife Refuges ==
There are 16 refuges totaling over 76,000,000 acres (31,000,000 ha).

- Alaska Maritime National Wildlife Refuge
- Arctic National Wildlife Refuge
- Alaska Peninsula National Wildlife Refuge
- Becharof National Wildlife Refuge including the Becharof Wilderness and Becharof Lake
- Innoko National Wildlife Refuge
- Izembek National Wildlife Refuge
- Kanuti National Wildlife Refuge
- Kenai National Wildlife Refuge
- Koyukuk National Wildlife Refuge
- Nowitna National Wildlife Refuge
- Potter Marsh: 564 acres (228 ha) within the Anchorage Coastal Wildlife Refuge
- Selawik National Wildlife Refuge
- Tetlin National Wildlife Refuge
- Yukon Delta National Wildlife Refuge
- Yukon Flats under the:
  - Yukon Flats National Wildlife Refuge
