= Alaska Aces =

Alaska Aces may refer to:

- Alaska Aces (ECHL), American ice hockey team
- Alaska Aces (PBA), Filipino basketball team
- Alaska's Clear and Equitable Share (ACES), a taxation structure in the state of Alaska
