= Kanuti Hot Springs =

Thermal spring in Alaska

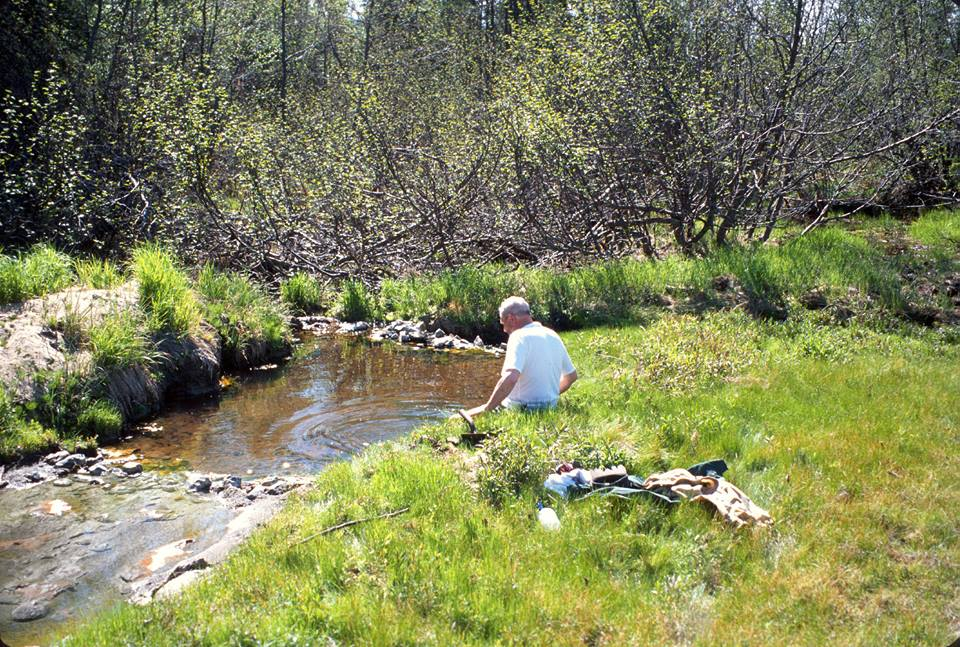
- Kanuti Hot Springs Area of Critical Environmental Concern, Alaska

- Location within Alaska
- Interactive map of Kanuti Hot Springs
- Location: Alaska
- Coordinates: 66°20′30″N 150°50′44″W
- Type: geothermal spring
- Temperature: 110 °F (43 °C)

Kanuti Hot Springs is a geothermal spring in an area of critical environmental concern in the Kanuti National Wildlife Refuge, Alaska, 15 miles north of the Arctic Circle.

== Water profile and geology ==
The hot mineral water emerges from the ground between 110 °F to 151 °F. Colonies of cyanobacteria grow in the spring, coloring areas along the edges with white, yellow and orange residue. Rainwater percolates through a deep fracture in the bedrock where it is heated by magma and emerges through rocks near the surface. Granitic rocks of the hot springs pluton have intruded on the south side of the Caribou Mountain complex. There is no indication of asymmetrical profiles that are characteristic of ultramapfic complexes.

== Location ==
The hot springs are located in a very remote area and are accessible during the winter months only via the Dalton Highway (mile marker 103).

== See also ==
- List of hot springs in the United States
- List of hot springs in the world
