= Political positions of Sarah Palin =

Categorization of political opinions expressed by Sarah Palin

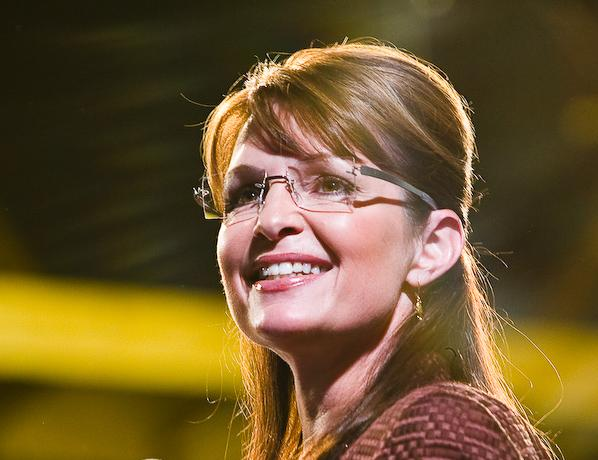
Governor Palin campaigning in Dover, New Hampshire, October 2008

Sarah Palin is an American politician, commentator and author who served as the ninth Governor of Alaska from 2006 to 2009. She was the Republican Party nominee for Vice President in the 2008 presidential election alongside Arizona Senator John McCain.

Palin has provided political commentary for Fox News and expressed her positions on a wide range of political issues during her career in the public eye.

== Social and legal issues ==
=== Religion in public life ===
Despite attending a Pentecostal church, which supported abstinence from alcohol, Palin, then on the Wasilla City Council, cast the deciding vote against restricting the hours during which the city's bars could operate. According to Gene Straatmeyer, a local Presbyterian minister, Palin told him during a city council hearing, "'I go to Assembly of God Church and I am a Sunday school teacher there, and I see no relationship between my Christian faith and what hours the bars close.'" Straatmeyer continued, "She felt it was out of line for me to testify on behalf of the church groups I represented." The effort to restrict bar hours was intended to combat drunken driving and spousal abuse, but Palin felt that restricting bar hours would hurt the local economy.

During a candidates' debate for governor in 2006, when asked how she would feel if a church pastor endorsed a candidate for governor, Palin said that she "would never support any government effort to stifle our freedom of religion or freedom of expression or freedom of speech," but would caution the pastor that the endorsement could result in "frustration" and "fewer dollars in the offering plate."

In 2006, Palin told the Associated Press that her personal beliefs would not dictate her public policies, adding that she was "not one to be out there preaching and forcing my views on anyone else."

During a debate for Governor of Alaska in 2006, Palin said she was a proponent of teaching both creationism and evolution in Alaska public schools. The following day she said: "It doesn't have to be part of the curriculum," and that she would not push to have it added. She also said she would not use religion or views on creationism as a litmus test in picking members of Alaska Board of Education. (Under state law, the board of education determines the content of the public schools' curriculum.) Palin has also said that evolution "should be taught as an accepted principle. As you know, I also say that as the daughter of a school teacher, a science teacher, who has really instilled in me a respect for science. It should be taught in our schools. And I won't deny that I see the hand of God in this beautiful creation that is Earth. But that is not part of the state policy or a local curriculum in a school district. Science should be taught in science class."

While Governor Palin vetoed public funding for private, Christian schools, saying after the fact, "I'm a Christian.... [The funding is] unconstitutional. It's illegal. You can't do that. I had to go in there and veto those things and, of course, was accused then of being, 'Oh, you're not a real conservative or a real Republican. Otherwise, you would have fought for that.' No, illegal is illegal."

As Alaska Governor, she signed the "Christian Heritage Week" Proclamation in October 2007 which "reminds Alaskans of the role Christianity has played in our rich heritage." She also declared the week of November 18–25, 2007 as Bible Week in Alaska, saying that "the Bible has profoundly influenced art, literature, music, and codes of law."

On June 10, 2010, Palin expressed dismay on her Twitter account that the floodlights of the Empire State Building would not be changed blue and white in honor of Mother Teresa's 100th birthday. Palin asked why the building's owner "won't honor Mother Theresa's compassionate, selfless efforts for humanity, but [you will] honor [the] Communist Mao?" Palin was referring to the Empire State Building's September 9, 2009, lighting scheme, when it was bathed in red and yellow to mark the 60th anniversary of the founding of the People's Republic of China.

Palin opposed the construction of Park51, a proposed 13-story Islamic cultural center with mosque, planned to be built in New York City on Park Place between West Broadway and Church Street, two blocks away from Ground Zero.

In the wake of the Supreme Court decision Snyder v. Phelps, which held that the Westboro Baptist Church had the right to picket the funerals of dead soldiers on a public sidewalk, Palin asserted that the Court held a double standard for the WBC's speech, as opposed to other religious speech. On March 2, 2011, she tweeted: "Common sense & decency absent as wacko 'church' allowed hate msgs spewed@ soldiers' funerals, but we can't invoke God's name in public square" Palin clarified her tweet the next day: "Obviously my comment meant that when we're told we can't say 'God bless you' in graduation speeches or pray before a local football game, but these wackos can invoke God's name in their hate speech while picketing our military funerals, it shows ridiculous inconsistency. I wasn't calling for any limit on free speech, and it's a shame some folks tried to twist my comment in that way. I was simply pointing out the irony of an often selective interpretation of free speech rights."

=== Gun rights ===
Palin, a strong proponent of gun ownership rights, and a lifetime member of the National Rifle Association of America, has said that she is against a ban on semi-automatic firearms, and was shown firing a military assault rifle in a 2008 campaign video. She praised District of Columbia vs. Heller, the Supreme Court decision in that invalidated Washington D.C.'s ban on handguns, and believes that any regulation of handgun possession violates the Second Amendment to the U.S. Constitution. She is in favor of gun-safety education for children, and is said to be popular among gun rights advocates.

=== Abortion ===
Palin is opposed to abortion in almost all cases, including rape and incest, but not if the life of the mother is endangered. In 2006, while running for governor, Palin was asked what she would do if her own daughter were raped and became pregnant; she responded that she would "choose life." She and her ex-husband have said that they have "faith that every baby is created for a good purpose." When asked what she would do as governor if Roe v. Wade were overturned, she responded "it would not be up [to me] to unilaterally ban anything. It would be up to the people of Alaska to discuss and decide how we would like our society to reflect our values." Palin personally supported bills to outlaw late-term abortions and to require parental consent for underage abortions in Alaska, but rebuffed religious conservatives who wanted to legislate restrictions on abortion even though she agreed with the bills.

In her televised interview with ABC News anchor Charlie Gibson on September 12, 2008, she made the statement that as a politician she felt that her opinions were to be made open to the public, but that sometimes it may differ with political legislation. When Gibson asked if she thought Roe v. Wade should be overturned, she replied, "I think it should, and I think that states should be able to decide that issue." Palin also said that she hoped "to reach out and work with those who are on the other side of this issue, because I know that we can all agree on the need for and the desire for fewer abortions in America and greater support for adoption, for other alternatives that women can and should be empowered to embrace, to allow that culture of life." Gibson noted that Republican presidential nominee John McCain allows exceptions for rape or incest, and asked, "Do you believe in it only in the case where the life of the mother is in danger?" Palin answered, "That is my personal opinion." When pressed on the matter, she said, "My personal opinion is that abortion allowed if the life of the mother is endangered. Please understand me on this. I do understand McCain's position on this. I do understand others who are very passionate about this issue who have a differing [opinion]."

=== Stem cell research ===
Palin said in 2006 that because she believes embryonic stem cell research causes the destruction of life, this research is inconsistent with her pro-life position and she does not support it.

All of the various adult stem cell research approaches are supported by Palin. In an interview with Charlie Gibson, Palin differentiated between the two types of stem cell research "And thankfully, again, not only are there other options, but we're getting closer and closer to finding a tremendous amount of other options, like, as I mentioned, the adult stem cell research".

=== Sex education ===
Palin answered a 2006 gubernatorial questionnaire by choosing support for funding of abstinence-before-marriage programs over support for "explicit sex-education programs, school-based clinics and the distribution of contraceptives in schools". In a subsequent radio interview with KTOO (FM) in Juneau, Alaska, she clarified her position by saying she was against explicit sex education, but was in favor of contraceptive education. She characterized in-school discussion of condoms as "relatively benign" and not something that would define an "explicit" program. Palin said of contraception that "kids who may not hear about it at home should hear about it in other avenues."

=== Women's issues ===
==== Feminism ====
Palin has been a member of Feminists for Life since 2006. In August 2006, she told the Anchorage Daily News that "no woman should have to choose between her career, education and her child." In an interview with Katie Couric on September 30, 2008, Palin said, "I'm a feminist who believes in equal rights and I believe that women certainly today have every opportunity that a man has to succeed, and to try to do it all, anyway. And I'm very, very thankful that I've been brought up in a family where gender hasn't been an issue."

In subsequent interviews with Brian Williams on October 29, 2008, Palin was quoted as saying, "I am not going to label myself anything, Brian, and I think that's what annoys a lot of Americans, especially in a political campaign is start trying to label different parts of America, different backgrounds. I'm not going to label myself, but I do believe in women's rights; I believe in equal rights, and I am so thankful I was brought up in were really gender has never been an issue."

During various public appearances, such as her May 14 Susan B. Anthony List speech, Palin has referred to the suffragists as "feminist foremothers" and has called for a "new, conservative feminist movement".

=== Same-sex unions ===
Palin opposes both same-sex marriage and civil unions. While campaigning for election as Governor of Alaska in 2006, Palin declared that she supported the 1998 Alaska constitutional amendment that proposed adding "...a marriage may exist only between one man and one woman" to the Alaskan constitution in order to ensure that same-sex marriage did not become legal in that state.

Palin opposed state-covered health and retiree benefits to same-sex partners of state employees but complied with an Alaska Supreme Court directive to do so and subsequently vetoed a bill that would have denied the benefits. In an interview with Newsweek in 2007, she affirmed her support for an amendment to the state constitution denying benefits to same-sex couples. She later signed a bill ordering a non-binding referendum for a constitutional amendment to deny the benefits. Although the referendum passed in April 2007, with 53 percent of voters supporting a constitutional amendment, a bill to place such an amendment on the ballot in November 2008 stalled in the state legislature.

Palin has said that she supports a Federal Constitutional Amendment to ban same-sex marriage. This position differed with that of her running mate, John McCain. In a July 31, 2012, interview with Greta Van Susteren, Palin was asked about states' rights as they pertained to same-sex marriage, to which Palin responded, "I believe that states have that constitutional right to make decisions about a variety of issues, but when it comes to some very fundamental, very cornerstone aspects of our society, of our culture, I personally would love to see a national dialogue about what will America continue to define as marriage. As a former Governor, I say let the states decide that, and that's where I would be if I were in national office. I'd be saying let the states decide. And if you see, Greta, and pay attention to where the states have gone with this particular issue and the votes of the people, overwhelmingly the people within the states have said they want to continue to define marriage as one man and one woman, as the Muslims do, Orthodox Jews do, nondenominational Christians do, faith-practicing Catholics do. It truly is a cornerstone of religion and civilization."

On March 1, 2011, Palin told National Organization for Marriage Chairman Maggie Gallagher that she opposed the Obama administration's refusal to continue defending the Defense of Marriage Act: "I have always believed that marriage is between one man and one woman. Like most Americans, I support the Defense of Marriage Act and find it appalling that the Obama administration decided not to defend this federal law, which was enacted with broad bipartisan support and signed into law by a Democrat president. It's appalling, but not surprising that the President has flip-flopped on yet another issue from his stated position as a candidate to a seemingly opposite position once he was elected."

=== Legal system ===
==== Judicial appointments ====
While interviewing candidates to fill judge vacancies in Alaska state courts, Palin asked prospective appointees questions about work history, background, and basic judicial philosophy. She did not ask such individuals about their positions on abortion or any other specific cases.

==== Jury rights ====
On August 31, 2007, Palin signed a Jury Rights Day Proclamation, commemorating September 5, 2007, as the 337th anniversary of the acquittal, in defiance of the legal direction of the bench, of William Penn and William Mead, after a Quaker sermon, for unlawful assembly.

=== Crime and violence ===
==== Capital punishment ====
Palin has declared herself in favor of capital punishment. She has said: "If the legislature passed a death penalty law, I would sign it. We have a right to know that someone who rapes and murders a child or kills an innocent person in a drive-by shooting will never be able to do that again."

==== Drugs ====
Palin is opposed to efforts to decriminalize or legalize marijuana, which she says sends the wrong message to children. Palin does not support full legalization of medical cannabis but said, "I'm not going to get in the way of a doctor prescribing something that he or she believes will help a cancer patient." Palin has admitted to using marijuana, though at a time when doing so was legal under state law. Palin has also said she is more concerned about methamphetamine, which she sees as a greater social threat.

During her June 12, 2010, appearance on Freedom Watch, Palin elaborated on her stance that even though marijuana should not be legalized, enforcement of marijuana prohibition laws should be made a lower priority: "Well, if we're talking about pot, I'm not for the legalization of pot because I think that that would just encourage, especially, our young people to think that it was okay to go ahead and use it. And I'm not an advocate for that. However, I think that we need to prioritize our law enforcement efforts. And if somebody's gonna smoke a joint in their house and not do anybody else any harm, then perhaps there are other things that our cops should be looking at to engage in and try to clean up some of the other problems that we have in society that are appropriate for law enforcement to do and not concentrate on such a, relatively speaking, minimal problem that we have in the country."

In a November 19, 2015, radio interview with Hugh Hewitt, Palin was asked about the legalization of recreational marijuana in Alaska, to which Palin responded, "We've got that libertarian streak in us, and I grew up in Alaska when pot was legal anyway. It was absolutely no big deal. I mean, you didn't smoke it because your parents would strangle you. And if you were a jock and you were, you know, a Christian going to youth group, you just didn't do it, right? And I still believe that. But when it comes to picking our battles, for many of us in Alaska, legalization of marijuana just was never really a bright blip on the radar screen, so it didn't surprise me when the voters of Alaska went back to legalizing it. For some years there, it had not been legalized. I look on the national scene and think, 'Wow, of all things to be fighting over and battling over.' Especially when it comes to medical marijuana, I think, 'Hmm. It's just not my baby.'"

=== Illegal immigration ===
On October 31, 2008, Palin told reporter Greta Van Susteren that closing the borders should be the first priority in dealing with illegal immigration. She rejects amnesty for illegal immigrants who have violated federal law. Palin did, however, state that she supported a path to citizenship for illegal immigrants.

In a December 3, 2009, radio interview with Rusty Humphries, Palin was asked her position on illegal aliens and closing the Mexico – United States border, to which she replied, "We must close the border. They're called 'illegal aliens' for a reason, and if they're not going to follow the rules, they should not be in our country."

On July 9, 2010, episode of The O'Reilly Factor, Palin again indicated support for a path to citizenship but clarified that illegal aliens should not be "rewarded for bad behavior": "We won't complicate it any more. Let's keep it simple, and let's say, 'No if you are here illegally and you don't follow the steps that at some point through immigration reform we're going to be able to provide, and that is to allow somehow you to work. If you're not going to do that, then you will be deported. You will be gone." Palin emphasized that more border enforcement should come first and said that current attempts at reform should "learn from history," concerning the amnesty granted by Ronald Reagan, which she believed was "botched."

On June 1, 2011, Palin said her opposition to the DREAM Act, a bill that would provide conditional permanent residency to certain illegal and deportable alien students who graduate from U.S. high schools, who are of good moral character, arrived in the U.S. legally or illegally as minors and have been in the country continuously for at least five years before the bill's enactment: "The immigrants in the past, they had to literally and figuratively stand in line and follow the rules to become U.S. citizens. I'd like to see that continue, but unfortunately, the Dream Act kind of usurps that, the system, that is a legal system, to make sure that immigrants who want to be here legally, working hard, producing and supplying revenue and resources for their family, that they're able to do that right and legally. Unfortunately, the DREAM act doesn't accomplish that."

=== Julian Assange ===
In December 2020, Palin called for Julian Assange to be pardoned.

=== Barack Obama's birth certificate ===
Palin expressed various views about birther conspiracy theories regarding Barack Obama. At one point, she said that she believed that Barack Obama was born in the United States and that questions about his birthplace were a distraction. However, at other times, she described conspiracy theories about his birthplace as a "fair question" and said "I think the public rightfully is still making it an issue." In reference to Donald Trump, "I appreciate that The Donald wants to spend his resources on something that so interests him and so many Americans, you know more power to him," and "I think that he was born in Hawaii, because there was the birth announcement put in the newspaper, but obviously there is something there that the president doesn't want people to see on that birth certificate, that he sees going to great lengths to make sure it isn't shown. And that's perplexing for a lot of people".

=== COVID-19 ===
In March 2021, after revealing that she had been diagnosed with COVID-19, she told People magazine that elderly people's "health and quality of life should be a national focus and priority," that wearing a mask indoors was "better than doing nothing to slow the spread," and that people should "use common sense." In September 2021, she said on Fox News that she believed her previous infection had given her "immunity" and that she had therefore chosen not to be vaccinated.

=== 2020 presidential election ===
Palin supports former President Donald Trump and after his election loss in the 2020 United States presidential election and Trump's false claim that the election was stolen, she repeated the false claims that the election was fraudulent.

== Economic issues ==
Palin describes herself as a fiscal conservative. At the Republican National Convention, Palin said, "I came to office promising to control spending – by request if possible and by veto if necessary... I suspended the state fuel tax, and championed reform to end the abuses of earmark spending by Congress."

Shortly after becoming governor, Palin canceled a contract for the construction of an 11-mile (18 km) gravel road outside Juneau to a mine and sold the state's Westwind II jet, which had been purchased by the Frank Murkowski administration against the wishes of the legislature. While governor, she slashed the state budget by $231 million for FY2008. The vetoes – which covered 36 spreadsheet pages – drew praise from those who believed the budget originally reflected too much spending, but anger from those who thought Palin went too far. The $231 million in cuts represented over 300 local projects including an expansion of the Port of Anchorage and the Fire Island wind energy project.

=== Bailout ===
In September 2008, responding to Katie Couric's question asking if America can enter another Great Depression without the $700-billion bailout, Palin said, "Unfortunately, that is the road that America may find itself on. Not necessarily this, as it's been proposed, has to pass or we're going to find ourselves in another Great Depression. But, there has got to be action – bipartisan effort – Congress not pointing fingers at one another but finding the solution to this, taking action, and being serious about the reforms on Wall Street that are needed."

=== Earmarks ===
While Palin was mayor of Wasilla, the town paid a lobbying firm $24,000 to $36,000 per year to help secure federal earmarks for the town. Palin herself went to Washington to ask for more earmarks from the state's congressional delegation. According to a review by Taxpayers for Common Sense, a nonpartisan group, Wasilla (a town of 6,700 residents) benefited from $26.9 million in earmarks in Palin's final four years in office. According to reporting by ABC News, however, Wasilla only directly received $7.95 million, and the $26.9 million figure refers to the amount the entire Matanuska-Susitna Borough received.

In the 2005 budget year, Alaska governor Frank Murkowski had requested $550 million in earmarks. In 2008 budget year, Palin sought $256 million in earmarks, and for the 2009 budget Palin gave a list of 31 proposed earmarks, totaling $197 million, to Alaskan Senator Ted Stevens. For the fiscal year 2010 budget, the last one before her resignation, Palin requested eight earmarks worth $69.1 million.

=== Housing issues ===
On September 6, 2008, Palin said that the mortgage finance giants Fannie Mae and Freddie Mac have "gotten too big and too expensive to the taxpayers. The McCain-Palin administration will make them smaller and smarter and more effective for homeowners who need help."

=== Health care ===
Palin supports free-market competition in health care, and laws allowing patients better access to medical pricing information. In 2008, Palin said she was considering incentives for employers to provide health insurance. She added that changes must also include citizens "choosing to take more personal responsibility" to be healthier. In a Wall Street Journal editorial, Palin argued in favor of a free-market approach to health care including deregulation, tort reform and "providing Medicare recipients with vouchers that allow them to purchase their own coverage." Palin's Healthcare Decisions Day proclamation in April 2008 said that it was "designed to raise public awareness of the need to plan for healthcare decisions, related to end of life care and medical decision-making whenever patients are unable to speak for themselves and to encourage the specific use of advance directives to communicate these important healthcare decisions."

==== Death panels ====
Palin played a leading role in promoting the false claim that the Affordable Care Act would lead to "death panels." She coined the term when she charged that proposed legislation would create a "death panel" of bureaucrats who would carry out triage, i.e. decide whether Americans—such as her elderly parents, or children with Down syndrome—were "worthy of medical care". Palin's claim has been referred to as the "death panel myth", as nothing in any proposed legislation would have led to individuals being judged to see if they were worthy of health care. Palin's claim was reported as false and criticized by the press, fact-checkers, academics, physicians, Democrats, and some Republicans. Some prominent Republicans backed Palin's statement. One poll showed that after it spread, about 85% of respondents were familiar with the charge and of those who were familiar with it, about 30% thought it was true. For 2009, "death panel" was named as PolitiFact's "Lie of the Year", one of FactCheck's "whoppers", and the most outrageous new term by the American Dialect Society.

Articles that Palin wrote and posted to her Facebook page include Statement on the Current Health Care Debate (August 7, 2009) and Concerning the "Death Panels" (August 12, 2009). She also mentioned death panels in a statement she made to the New York State Senate Aging Committee" and in a Wall Street Journal editorial, both dated September 8, 2009. Palin expressed her opinion of Obama's plans for health care reform, including in part in the first article:

Democrats promise that a government health care system will reduce the cost of health care, but as the economist Thomas Sowell has pointed out, government health care will not reduce the cost; it will simply refuse to pay the cost. And who will suffer the most when they ration care? The sick, the elderly, and the disabled, of course. The America I know and love is not one in which my parents or my baby with Down syndrome will have to stand in front of Obama's "death panel" so his bureaucrats can decide, based on a subjective judgment of their "level of productivity in society," whether they are worthy of health care. Such a system is downright evil.

In August 2009, Palin's spokesperson said that Palin's "death panel" statements referred to H.R. 3200 Advance Care Planning Consultation page 425.

=== Social Security ===
On October 6, 2010, Palin spoke with reporters and fielded a question about Social Security. She said, "[W]e are going to have to make some tough decisions today. Thomas Paine, one of our Founders, had said, 'If there is to be trouble, let it be in my day, so that my child may have peace.' What he meant way back then was that there should be an expectation that some sacrifices will have to be made, in our generation, so that future generations can have the opportunities that we've had to grow and thrive and prosper so that our private sector can do what a private sector does best in creating jobs. So, yeah, with some practical things that have to be made, some decisions here, with perhaps changing, in future years, not adversely affecting those who are reliant on retirement benefits today, for instance, Social Security benefits, but changing, the eligibility in future years. That has to be something that we're brave enough, courageous enough, to start talking about."

=== Taxes ===
In a September 18, 2008, speech at Cedar Rapids, Iowa, Palin said, "Our opponents, they have some strange ideas about raising taxes. To them, raising taxes – and Joe Biden repeated it today – raising taxes is about patriotism. To the rest of America, that's not patriotism. Raising taxes is about killing jobs and hurting small businesses, and making things worse. This isn't about anyone's patriotism – it's about Barack Obama's poor judgment."

As mayor, using income generated by a two percent sales tax that was enacted prior to her election, Palin cut property taxes by 75 percent and eliminated personal property and business inventory taxes. Palin also supported a voter-approved city sales tax increase of 0.5 percent to pay for a new sports complex. As governor, Palin helped pass a tax increase on oil company profits, although she opposed the Windfall Profits Tax proposed by Senator Barack Obama.

== Energy and environment ==
=== Department of Energy ===
Palin told Newsweek that she favors revamping or even eliminating the United States Department of Energy, along with other Cabinet-level departments, to reduce the Federal debt. "That's the kind of grand reform that is very, very difficult to do. But it can be done," she said.

=== Natural gas pipeline ===
In June 2008, Palin said that she would work to create jobs by building a pipeline to bring North Slope natural gas to North American markets. In her acceptance speech at the GOP in September 2008, Palin said: "I fought to bring about the largest private-sector infrastructure project in North American history," "And when that deal was struck, we began a nearly forty billion dollars natural gas pipeline to help lead America to energy independence." TransCanada projects the pipeline to be operational by late 2018, barring unforeseen obstacles.

=== Nuclear energy ===
As part of her written comments in July 2009 regarding Obama's cap-and-trade energy plan, Palin included that "... every state can consider the possibility of nuclear energy". This includes new model nuclear reactors, such as those developed by Hyperion Power Generation, such as the deployment of a 225MW reactor for Alaska. Furthermore, she supports the overhaul of nuclear regulatory regime to allow the ready deployment of these new, smaller, nuclear reactors.

=== Oil and gas development ===
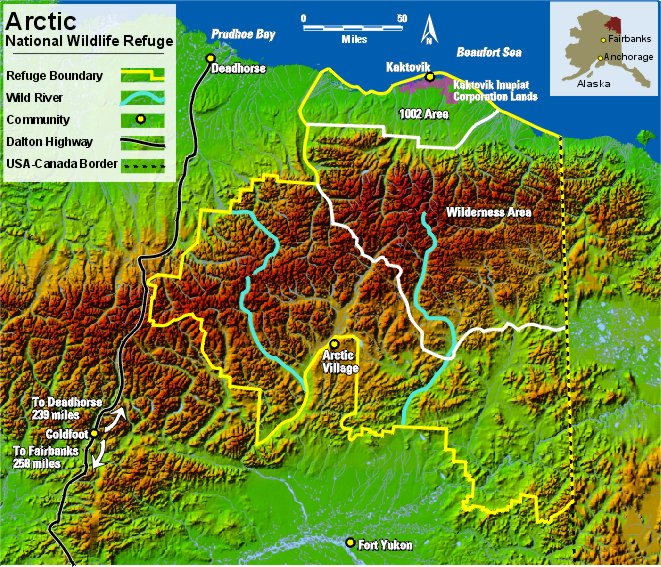
Arctic National Wildlife Refuge Map: 1002 Area, the proposed drilling area

As governor, Palin strongly promoted oil and natural gas resource development in Alaska, and advocates exposing the Arctic National Wildlife Refuge to drilling, controverting McCain's position.

In an interview with Time in 2008, Palin argued that energy independence through ANWR drilling was essential to reducing American dependence on hostile foreign regimes. "We need to drill, drill, drill," she told the Wall Street Journal; she argues that "ANWR is only the size of the Los Angeles airport, and drilling there isn't environmentally destructive." To assuage a fear that oil and gas development would be hampered by the listing of polar bears as a threatened species, Palin tried to sue the US government.

Palin told RealClearPolitics on May 31, 2011, that she supports the elimination of all energy subsidies, such those for ethanol: "I think that all of our energy subsidies need to be relooked at today and eliminated, and we need to make sure that we're investing and allowing our businesses to invest in reliable energy products right now that aren't going to necessitate subsidies because, bottom line, we can't afford it." She continued, "We've got to allow the free market to dictate what's most efficient and economical for our nation's economy.

=== Global warming ===
Palin has not completely ruled out manmade global warming: "I believe that man's activities certainly can be contributing to the issue of global warming, climate change."

On September 14, 2007, Palin signed an administrative order creating a Climate Change Sub-Cabinet charged with preparing a climate change strategy for Alaska. Within her executive order, Palin described warming as a "global challenge" and sought "opportunities to reduce greenhouse gas emissions from Alaska sources, including the expanded use of alternative fuels, energy conservation, energy efficiency, renewable energy, land use management, and transportation planning." In April 2009 Palin acknowledged that "Simply waiting for low-carbon-emitting renewable capacity to be large enough will mean that it will be too late to meet the mitigation goals for reducing [carbon dioxide] that will be required under most credible climate-change models." In a December 2009 editorial, she wrote, "Our representatives in Copenhagen should remember that good environmental policymaking is about weighing real-world costs and benefits – not pursuing a political agenda. That's not to say I deny the reality of some changes in climate – far from it. I saw the impact of changing weather patterns firsthand while serving as governor of our only Arctic state." and "But while we recognize the occurrence of these natural, cyclical environmental trends, we can't say with assurance that man's activities cause weather changes. We can say, however, that any potential benefits of proposed emissions reduction policies are far outweighed by their economic costs."

=== Water ===
While governor, Palin opposed The Alaska Clean Water Act saying that "very stringent regulations and policies [were] already in place." The Clean Water Initiative was voted on as Ballot Measure 4 on August 26, 2008, and lost by a vote of about 57 percent against and 43 percent for the measure. The measure was designed to impose higher water quality standards on a large scale mining operation, known as the Pebble Mine, near the Bristol Bay.

Palin voiced her opposition to Measure 4, saying "Let me take my governor's hat off for just a minute here and tell you, personally, Prop 4- I vote no on that", she said. "I have all the confidence in the world that (the Department of Environmental Conservation) and our (Department of Natural Resources) has great, very stringent regulations and policies in place. We're going to make sure that mines only operate safely, soundly."

=== Overfishing ===
On April 13, 2012, appearance on Stossel, Palin related how, as a commercial fisherman, she saw firsthand how Japanese fishing trawlers were responsible for "pretty much raping the bottom of the ocean floor before there was strict regulation on overfishing, and these Japanese trawlers, with 20-mile long nets, being able to overfish and then waste the bycatch. The rest of us, like commercial fishermen, we sit there saying, 'Well, pretty soon, there's not going to be a species left for us to help feed the rest of the world.'" Host John Stossel referred to such abusive fishing practices as an example of the tragedy of the commons and suggested giving different groups private rights over different parts of the ocean.

=== Predator control ===
In 2007, Palin supported the Alaska Department of Fish and Game policy allowing Alaska the hunting of wolves from helicopters as part of a predator control program intended to increase moose and caribou populations. The Program has come under criticism and legal actions from wildlife activists saying the purpose of the program is to increase the numbers of prey species to unsustainable levels for sport hunters, residents, and non-residents of Alaska.

In May 2007, Palin introduced Bill 256 to streamline the Predator Program and make it more difficult for conservation groups to sue the State.

=== Endangered species ===
==== Polar bears ====
In December 2007, Palin wrote an opinion column in which she described her opposition to the listing of polar bears as a threatened species under the Endangered Species Act. In it she also said that the polar bear population is more numerous now than 40 years ago and "there is insufficient evidence of polar bears becoming extinct in the foreseeable future". After Dirk Kempthorne, the Republican Secretary of the United States Department of the Interior, listed the bear as threatened on May 14, 2008, Palin (representing the state of Alaska) sued the federal government, arguing that the listing would adversely affect energy development in the bears' habitat off Alaska's northern and northwestern coasts, while again questioning the scientific basis for the listing.

Palin claimed that scientists found no ill effects of global warming on the polar bear, a claim disputed by Alaskan state scientists and environmental groups.

==== Beluga whales ====
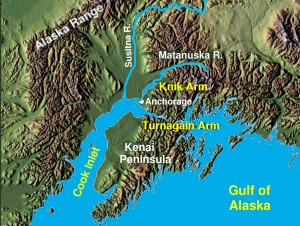
Cook Inlet stretches 180 miles (290 km) from the Gulf of Alaska to Anchorage in south-central Alaska.

Palin opposed strengthening protections for beluga whales in Alaska's Cook Inlet. She cited state scientists who claimed that hunting was the only factor causing the whales' decline and that the hunting had been effectively controlled through cooperative agreements with Alaska Native organizations. Recent research states that hunting controls have halted the decline of beluga whales in Cook's Inlet but that the population remains severely depleted and at high risk of extinction. The Cook Inlet Beluga Whale was declared an endangered species by the Bush Administration on October 17, 2008.

== Defense ==
On her first trip overseas, Palin visited Alaskan troops deployed to Iraq; told how much they missed hunting and fishing, she signed a law in June 2008 that grants free hunting, trapping and fishing licenses to members of the Alaska National Guard and reserve.

As governor of Alaska, Palin criticized proposed Obama administration cuts to missile defense programs, in response to North Korea's April 5, 2009 rocket test. In May 2009, North Korea conducted a series of short-range missile tests. Military experts believe a long-range missile could reach Alaska, where part of the United States' missile defense system is located. Palin called for the full restoration of Missile Defense Agency funding "to guarantee our protective measures remain the best in the world." The Defense Department had recommended not moving forward with a planned expansion of the missile defense system at Fort Greely in that year's budget. Palin disagreed: "Fort Greely plays a crucial role in the nation's security."

In a September 23, 2009, speech in Hong Kong, Palin said that "we need to maintain a strong defense" even in our current economic difficulties. She expressed her opposition to ending production of the F-22 Raptor fighter aircraft and C-17 cargo aircraft.

=== Don't Ask, Don't Tell ===
During an interview on February 7, 2010, Fox News Sunday host Chris Wallace asked Palin if she supported the repeal of "don't ask, don't tell," the United States military policy which restricts efforts to discover or reveal closeted gay, lesbian, and bisexual service members or applicants, while barring those who are openly gay, lesbian, or bisexual from military service. Palin responded, "I don't think so right now. I was surprised that the President spent time on that in his State of the Union speech when he only spent about 9 percent of his time in the State of the Union on national security issues. And I say that because there are other things to be worried about right now with the military. I think that kind of on the back burner is sufficient for now. To put so much time and effort and politics into it – unnecessary."

== Foreign policy ==
=== Afghanistan ===
In 2009, Palin wrote that "We can win in Afghanistan" and "we must do what it takes to prevail. The stakes are very high." She urged Obama to "devote the resources necessary in Afghanistan" and pledged to support him if he made the "right" decision.

=== Iraq ===
Palin supported the Bush Administration's policies in Iraq, but said "I'm a mom, and my son is going to get deployed in September, and we better have a real clear plan for this war. And it better not have to do with oil and dependence on foreign energy."

=== Iran, Syria ===
During the 2008 vice-presidential debate on October 2, 2008, Palin said that "A leader like Iranian President Mahmoud Ahmadinejad, who is not sane or stable when he says things like that, is not one whom we can allow acquiring nuclear energy, nuclear weapons." She also further criticized Obama's proposal in 2007 to meet with Ahmadinejad without preconditions, saying that such an action "is downright dangerous because leaders like Ahmadinejad, who would seek to acquire nuclear weapons and wipe off the face of the Earth an ally as we have in Israel, should not be met with without preconditions and diplomatic efforts being undertaken first."

In her June 2013 address to the Faith and Freedom Coalition's Road to Majority Conference, Palin declared her opposition to American involvement in the ongoing Syrian civil war: "Militarily, where is our Commander-in-Chief? We're talking now about more new interventions. I say, until we know what we're doing, until we have a Commander-in-Chief who knows what he's doing, well, Chief, in these radical Islamic countries who aren't even respecting basic human rights, where both sides are slaughtering each other as they scream over an arbitrary red line, 'Allah Akbar,' I say, until we have someone who knows what they're doing, I say, let Allah sort it out!"

=== Israel ===
In a meeting on September 2, 2008, with leaders of the American Israel Public Affairs Committee (AIPAC), a pro-Israel lobby, Palin said that she would "work to expand and deepen the strategic partnership between U.S. and Israel." Following the meeting, an AIPAC spokesman said that Palin had "expressed her deep, personal, and lifelong commitment to the safety and well-being of Israel."

In an interview with ABC News anchor Charles Gibson, Palin said that she would not "second-guess" Israeli military action against Iran.

During the 2008 vice-presidential debate, Palin expressed support for a two-state solution to the conflict between Israel and the Palestinians, pledged to move the U.S. Embassy from Tel Aviv to Jerusalem and reiterated her support for Israel's survival. Specifically, Palin said that "Israel is our strongest and best ally in the Middle East. We have to assure them that we will never allow a second Holocaust, despite, again, warnings from Iran and any other country that would seek to destroy Israel, that that is what they would like to see. We will support Israel. A two-state solution, building our embassy, also, in Jerusalem, those things that we look forward to being able to accomplish, with this peace-seeking nation, and they have a track record of being able to forge these peace agreements." Regarding Joe Biden's support for Israel, Palin said that "I'm so encouraged to know that we both love Israel, and I think that is a good thing to get to agree on, Senator Biden. I respect your position on that."

In November 2009, Palin expressed her support for the expansion of Israeli settlements in Palestinian territories, In an interview with Barbara Walters, Palin said, "I believe that the Jewish settlements should be allowed to be expanded upon, because that population of Israel is going to grow. More and more Jewish people will be flocking to Israel in the days and weeks and months ahead. And I don't think that the Obama administration has any right to tell Israel that the Jewish settlements cannot expand."

On March 5, 2011, Palin said that the United States should refrain from cutting off foreign aid to Israel while eliminating "waste and fraud" and "inefficiencies": "I don't support that kind of foreign aid at all, but when it comes to Israel – No... I stand strong with Israel, and unapologetically I say that America should keep this strong democratic ally that we have there in the Middle East and allow for protections around Israel."

On May 23, 2011, Palin reiterated her opposition to President Obama's statement that an independent Palestine is based on the borders of 1967, before the Yom Kippur War in which Israel occupied East Jerusalem, the West Bank and the Gaza Strip. Palin questioned whether Obama's call for a "sovereign and contiguous" Palestinian state could mean "carving Israel in half" and echoed The Independent, which asked, "Was the President implying that the new, improved Israel will border neither Jordan nor Egypt, as it does now? Would Palestine's contiguous territory come at the expense of Israel's? Would Israel get the Gaza Strip and the Mediterranean and Palestine get the Negev and a Red Sea port?"

=== Libya ===
On February 22, 2011, Palin criticized what she felt was the Obama administration's slow response to Muammar Gaddafi's violent response to the 2011 Libyan civil war and said that "NATO and our allies should look at establishing a no-fly zone so Libyan air forces cannot continue slaughtering the Libyan people."

Palin has since been critical of Obama's handling of the United States' military role in the 2011 military intervention in Libya. On April 16, 2011, she said Obama "willfully ignored the will of the American people... when you got us into a third war for fuzzy and inconsistent reasons, a third war that we cannot afford." She further criticized him on April 26, demanding Obama "step up and justify our Libyan involvement, or Americans are going to demand you pull out." She continued, "Simply put, what are we doing there? You've put us in a strategic no man's land. If Gaddafi's got to go, then tell NATO our continued participation hinges on this: We strike hard, and Gaddafi will be gone. If, as you and your spokesmen suggest, we're not to tell Libya what to do when it comes to that country's leadership, and if you can't explain to Americans why we're willing to protect Libyan resources and civilians but not Syria's, Yemen's, Bahrain's, Egypt's, Israel's, etc., then there is no justification for U.S. human and fiscal resources to be spent."

Following the Battle of Tripoli, Palin celebrated Gaddafi's defeat but cautioned against "triumphalism" and warned that the future Libyan government might not be democratic. She supported "work[ing] through diplomatic means to help those who want democracy to come out on top." Palin also said the United States should not commit "troops or military assets to serve as peacekeepers or perform humanitarian missions or nation-building in Libya. Our military is already over-committed and strained, and a vaguely designed mission can be the first step toward a quagmire."

=== NATO, Russia, Georgia, and Ukraine ===
In 2008, Palin said that the former Soviet states of Georgia and Ukraine should be admitted into NATO, and that if Russia invaded a NATO signatory country, the United States should be prepared to go to war in that country's defense. Following the Russian invasion of Georgia, which she claimed was unprovoked, she suggested Russia might invade Ukraine next.

Palin opposes New START, a bilateral nuclear arms reduction treaty between the United States and the Russian Federation. She argued that the treaty is "one-sided" because it "actually requires the U.S. to reduce our nuclear weapons and allows the Russians to increase theirs." Palin further said that the treaty's link between offensive and defensive weapons "virtually guarantees that either we limit our missile defenses or the Russians will withdraw from the treaty."

After the Russian invasion of Ukraine she advocated for a reduction in U.S. military aid to Ukraine and criticized U.S. involvement in the conflict.

=== Foreign aid ===
In 2011, Palin criticized President Obama for committing $2 billion to Egypt's new government as part of a $20 billion aid package pledged at the 37th G8 summit to Arab Spring states. She noted Egypt's "history of corruption when it comes to utilizing American aid" and the possibility of the Muslim Brotherhood taking the reins of Egypt's government. "Throwing borrowed money around is not sound economic policy. And throwing borrowed money around the developing world is not sound foreign policy," Palin said. "Foreign assistance should go to American allies that need it and appreciate it, and for humanitarian purposes when it can truly make a difference."

== See also ==
- Governorship of Sarah Palin
- Mayoralty of Sarah Palin
- Political positions of John McCain
- Political positions of Barack Obama
- Political positions of Joe Biden
