= Governorship of Sarah Palin =

Tenure as the 9th Governor of Alaska

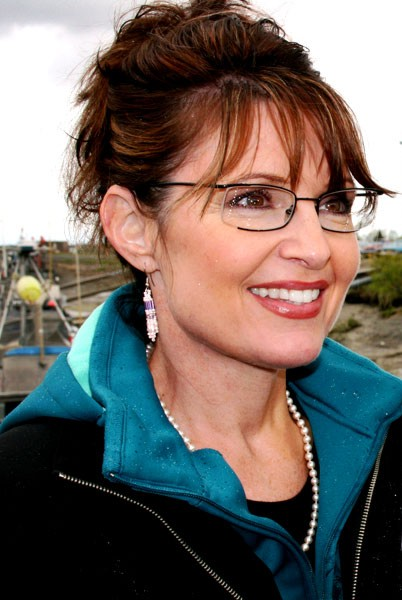
- Governorship of Sarah Palin; December 4, 2006 – July 26, 2009
- Governor: Sarah Palin
- Party: Republican
- Election: 2006

In 2006, Sarah Palin was elected governor of Alaska. Running on a clean-government platform, Palin defeated incumbent Governor Frank Murkowski in the Republican gubernatorial primary election in August. She then went on to win the general election in November, defeating former Governor Tony Knowles 48.3% to 40.9%. Her running mate was State Senator Sean Parnell.

During the Republican gubernatorial primary campaign, Palin was endorsed by former Alaska Governor Walter Hickel, and groups such as the Alaska Correctional Officers Association and Alaska Right to Life. Later, in the general election for governor, she was supported by Governor Frank Murkowski. Republican U.S. Senator Ted Stevens made a last-minute endorsement, filming a television commercial with Palin for the gubernatorial campaign.

During her campaign for governor, Palin declared that education, public safety, and transportation would be the three cornerstones of her administration. She won the race despite spending less than her Democratic opponent.

Palin became Alaska's first female governor and, at 42, the youngest in state history. She is the first Alaskan governor born after Alaska achieved U.S. statehood and the first governor not inaugurated in Juneau; she chose to have the ceremony in Fairbanks instead. She took office on December 4, 2006, and maintained a high approval rating throughout her term.

On July 3, 2009, Sarah Palin announced her resignation as governor of Alaska. She stepped down on July 26, 2009, being replaced by then Lieutenant Governor Sean Parnell.

== Government ethics ==
Palin had championed ethics reform throughout her election campaign. Her first legislative action after taking office was to push for a bipartisan ethics reform bill. She signed the resulting legislation in July 2007, calling it a "first step" declaring that she remains determined to clean up Alaska politics. However, Palin was also the subject of an ethics probe concerning her brother-in-law, Mike Wooten.

== Public Safety Commissioner dismissal ==
On July 11, 2008, Palin dismissed Public Safety Commissioner Walter Monegan, citing performance-related issues. She then offered him an alternative position as executive director of the state Alcoholic Beverage Control Board, which he turned down. Monegan alleged that his dismissal was retaliation for his failure to fire Palin's former brother-in-law, Alaska State Trooper Mike Wooten, who was involved in a child custody battle with Palin's sister, Molly McCann. He further alleged that contacts made by Palin herself, her staff, and her family had constituted inappropriate pressure to fire Wooten. Palin stated that most of those calls were made without her knowledge, and reiterated that she did not fire Monegan because of Wooten, who as of 2008 remained employed as a state trooper. On September 19, 2008, Todd Palin refused to testify to a state legislative committee about his role in the controversy.

Palin's choice to replace Monegan, Charles M. Kopp, chief of the Kenai police department, took the position on July 11, 2008. He resigned on July 25 after it was revealed that he had received a letter of reprimand for sexual harassment in his previous position. On August 1, the Alaska Legislature hired an independent investigator to review the situation, and report back by October. On August 13, Palin changed her position after an internal investigation, acknowledging that her staff had contacted Monegan or his staff regarding Wooten, but reiterating that she had not fired Monegan because of Wooten. On September 1, Palin's lawyer asked the state Legislature to drop its investigation, saying that by state law, the governor-appointed state Personnel Board had jurisdiction over ethics issues. Palin also asked that the Board review the matter as an ethics complaint.

On October 10, 2008, the Republican-dominated Alaska Legislative Council unanimously voted to release the Branchflower investigative report which found that Sarah Palin abused her power as governor in the firing of Monegan.

On November 3, 2008, the Alaska Personnel Board concluded that Palin had not violated ethics laws, essentially contradicting the findings of the Branchflower probe. Tim Petumenos, the attorney hired by the Personnel Board to conduct the probe, stated in his final report, "There is no probable cause to believe that the governor, or any other state official, violated the Alaska Executive Ethics Act in connection with these matters."

== Energy ==
Palin has promoted oil and natural gas resource development in Alaska, including in the Arctic National Wildlife Refuge (ANWR), where such development has been the subject of a national debate. She also helped pass an increase in the severance tax oil companies pay to extract oil from state land. Palin has created a new sub-cabinet group of advisers to address climate change and reduce greenhouse gas emissions within Alaska. When asked about climate change after becoming Senator McCain's presumptive running mate, she stated that it would "affect Alaska more than any other state", but she added, "I'm not one though who would attribute it to being man-made." and "I believe that man's activities certainly can be contributing to the issue of global warming, climate change."

Shortly after taking office, Palin rescinded 35 appointments made by Murkowski in the last hours of his administration, including that of his former chief of staff James "Jim" Clark to the Alaska Natural Gas Development Authority.

In January 2009, Governor Palin introduced a new plan that would convert 50% of Alaska's energy resources to renewables. The plan has been hailed by some environmental activists as the most ambitious alternative energy project in the country.

=== Gas pipeline ===
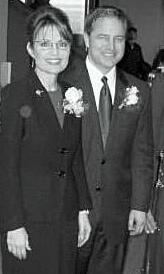
Palin with Lt. Governor Sean Parnell

In March 2007, Palin presented the Alaska Gasline Inducement Act (AGIA) as the new legal vehicle for building a natural gas pipeline from the state's North Slope. This negated a deal by the previous governor to grant the contract to a coalition including BP (her husband's employer). Only one legislator, Representative Ralph Samuels, voted against the measure, and in June, Palin signed it into law. On January 5, 2008, Palin announced that a Canadian company, TransCanada Corporation, was the sole AGIA-compliant applicant. In August 2008, Palin signed a bill into law giving the state of Alaska authority to award TransCanada Pipelines $500 million in seed money and a license to build and operate the $26-billion pipeline to transport natural gas from the North Slope to the Lower 48 through Canada. TransCanada projects the pipeline to be operational by late 2018, barring unforeseen obstacles.

=== Gasoline taxes ===
In June 2008, Governor Sarah Palin asked the Legislature to give Alaskans a special one-time payment of $1,200 to help with the high costs of energy. She said it will come out of the windfall the state is getting from high oil prices. The legislation was passed and signed into law by Gov. Palin in August 2008.

This replaces the proposal that Palin dropped to give Alaskans $100-a-month energy debit cards. The governor said the debit cards were too expensive for the state to administer and wouldn't work in some rural Alaskan communities.

"As the fiscal year winds down, Alaskans are assured of surpluses beyond the billions of dollars put into savings and funding for priorities such as forward funding education and municipal revenue sharing," Palin said in a press release. "With savings and funding priorities covered, I am confident that Alaskans, who are the owners of our resources, can spend their resource revenue better than government can."

Palin is also proposing to suspend the eight-cent-a gallon state fuel tax for one year. Palin said she wants the Legislature to implement these things by September. Additionally the Palin administration proposed the Alaska's Clear and Equitable Share (ACES), a plan to protect tax revenue to the state government from fluctuations in oil prices.

== Environment ==
=== Predator control ===
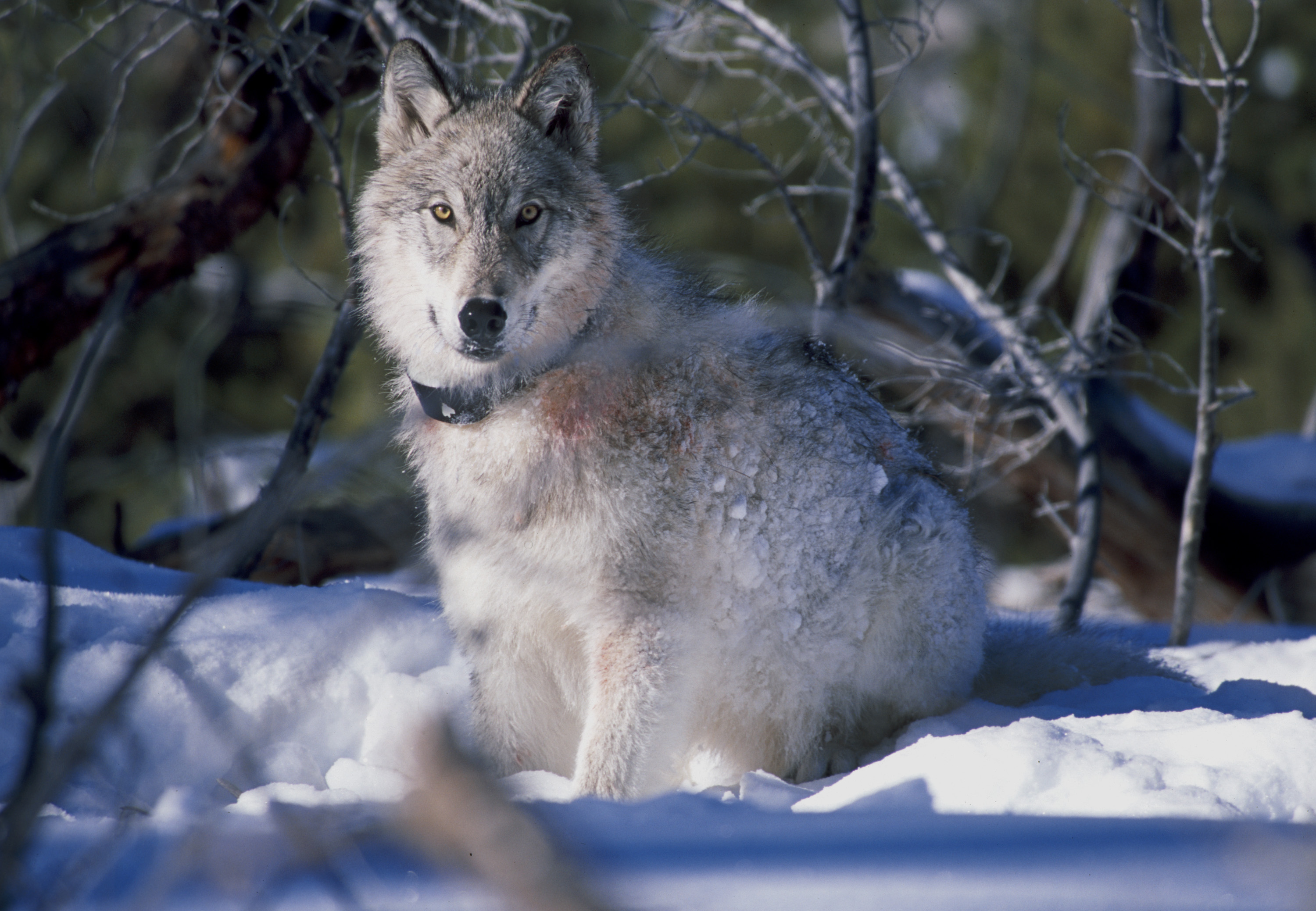
Wolf with Radio Collar

Bounties on wolves in Alaska date to at least 1915; in 1994, the Alaska State Legislature enacted the "Intensive Management Law," requiring management of wildlife for human consumptive use and authorizing specific management actions including "liberalizing hunting and trapping regulations for wolves and bears." In 2006 the Alaska Department of Fish and Game and The Board of Game extended areas in which the aerial hunting of wolves was allowed under the Predator Control Program. Friends of Animals, Defenders of Wildlife, the Alaska Wildlife Alliance, and the Sierra Club sued the Department attempting to overturn the practice. Their concerns were overgrazing of the habitat by large population of moose that were intended for sports hunters, the wolves kept the moose populations in balance with the environment.

In 2007, Palin supported the Alaska Department of Fish and Game policy allowing wolf hunting from helicopters as part of a predator control program intended to increase moose populations, which many rural Alaskans subsist on. In March 2007, Palin's office announced that a bounty of $150 per wolf would be paid to the 180 volunteer pilots and gunners, to offset fuel costs. This drew protest among wildlife activists, who took the state to court and won. Though the activists failed to stop aerial hunting, a state judge forced the state to stop paying the bounty.

In May 2007 Palin introduced Bill 256 to streamline the Predator Program, and make it more difficult for conservation groups to sue the State. Critics of the bill claimed it removed scientific standards and claim the programs are expensive and not effective.

In August, 2007, both lawmakers and Governor Palin approved appropriating $400,000 from the state treasury to explain the aerial hunting program to Alaskans. Since Alaskans were voting the following year on an initiative restricting the practice to Department of Fish and Game personnel, many felt the funds were an attempt to influence the vote against the initiative. Alaskans had passed similar measures in 1996 and 2000, each time with a two-year limit; after they expired the state legislature allowed the Game Board to resume the program. The program also allowed the fly-and-shoot, liberalized hunting of black bears with no bag limits in the same areas, in addition to the area from Anchorage across Cook Inlet in Game Unit 16, which allows the killing of sows and cubs as well as males.

In March 2008 a federal judge upheld the aerial gunning program as a whole, while banning the practice in four areas covering up to 15,000 of the 60,000 square miles (160,000 km^{2}) covered by the program. The judge said that before the Game Board extended predator control into new areas it had to make new findings on the wolves, caribou and bears in those areas. On August 26, 2008, Alaskans voted against ending the state's predator control program.

=== Clean Water Act ===
Palin expressed her personal opinion as a private citizen against State Ballot Measure Four, known as Alaska's Clean Water Act, a week prior to a statewide election held August 26, 2008. Conflict among commercial fishing and environmental interests versus mining interests in Alaska's Bristol Bay prompted the ballot petition. Measure Four was defeated at the polls by 57% of Alaskan voters. Anglo-American Mining Company is seeking to develop a gold and copper mine within proximity to Bristol Bay that could pollute the Bay's headwaters. The initiative was to prevent waste materials from large-scale mining operations from seeping into salmon watersheds. Such development could threaten the spawning grounds for the largest remaining wild salmon run. Experts say the mine could yield more than $300 billion in metals and hundreds of jobs. The commercial fishing from salmon at Bristol supplies $300 million per year to the Alaskan economy in its present environmental state and a feature of the state's heritage. Opponents pointed to existing state and federal environmental laws that already achieve the same health and wildlife protections requested under Measure Four. They also claim that the Measure as written was open to interpretation which could drive stricter environmental standards that shut down all new, large metallurgic mines in Alaska. Despite this potential redundancy, there are claims that the enforcement of mining industry environmental regulations in Alaska and nationwide are imperfect and pollution outside acceptable limits periodically occurs at existing sites to varying degrees. Also, the downside risk of an environmental accident at the proposed Anglo-American site could permanently decrease fishing activity at Bristol.

=== Endangered species ===
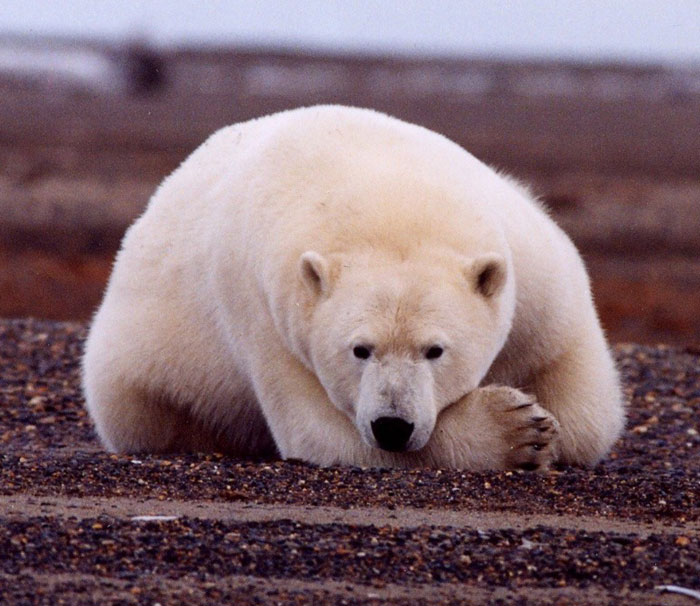
A polar bear

==== Polar bears ====
In December 2007, Palin wrote an opinion column in which she described her opposition to the listing of polar bears as a threatened species under the Endangered Species Act, stating her position was based on a review of expert opinion. In it she stated that the polar bear population is more numerous now than it was forty years ago, and "there is insufficient evidence of polar bears becoming extinct in the foreseeable future." Alaskan state biologists and environmental groups disagreed with Palin's position. After Dirk Kempthorne, the Republican Secretary of the United States Department of the Interior listed the bear as threatened on May 14, 2008, Palin sued the federal government, claiming that the listing would adversely affect energy development in the bears' habitat off Alaska's northern and northwestern coasts, while again questioning the scientific basis for the listing. Palin claimed the scientists found no ill effects of global warming on the polar bear. Rick Steiner, a University professor of Alaska, sought the e-mail messages of the state scientists who had examined the effects of global warming on the bears, and was informed his request would cost $466,784 to process. Through a federal records request Steiner was able to obtain the e-mails and he found that contrary to Palin's claims, the scientists supported the fact that the bears were in danger.

On August 28, 2008, the American Petroleum Institute, the National Association of Manufacturers, the United States Chamber of Commerce, and the American Iron and Steel Institute joined Alaska's suit to revert the listing of the polar bear as a threatened species. The issue at hand is a rule implemented by the federal government at the time the status of the Polar Bear was changed to threatened. The rule is to prevent the polar bear's status from being used as a tool for imposing greenhouse gas limits; it exempts projects in all states except Alaska from undergoing review in relation to emissions. The Center for Biological Diversity, is also suing the federal government, to change the Polar Bear status from threatened to endangered. They denounced the Alaska suit's claim that science does not prove polar bear populations are declining.

==== Beluga whales ====
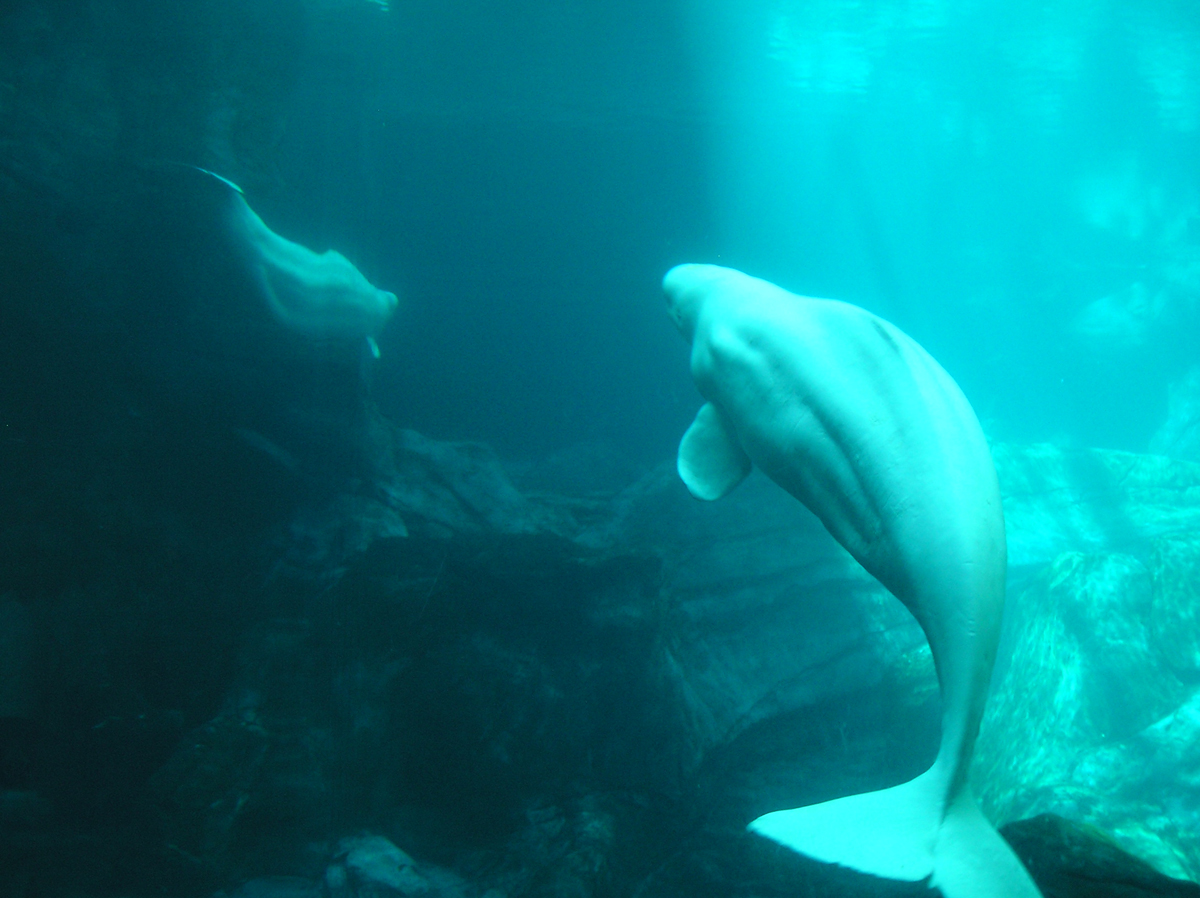
Beluga whales

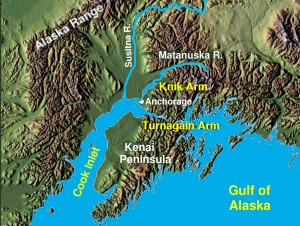
Cook Inlet stretches 180 miles (290 km) from the Gulf of Alaska to Anchorage in south-central Alaska.

Palin has opposed strengthening protections for beluga whales in Alaska's Cook Inlet. Palin cited state scientists who claimed that hunting was the only factor causing the whales' decline and that the hunting has been effectively controlled through cooperative agreements with Alaska Native organizations. Recent research suggests that despite hunting controls beluga whales in Cook's Inlet remain severely depleted and at high risk of extinction. The United States government on October 17, 2008, listed the beluga whale as endangered due to severe declines in its population. The National Marine Fisheries Service stated that oil and gas exploration had hindered the whale's existence.

== Budget ==
=== State ===
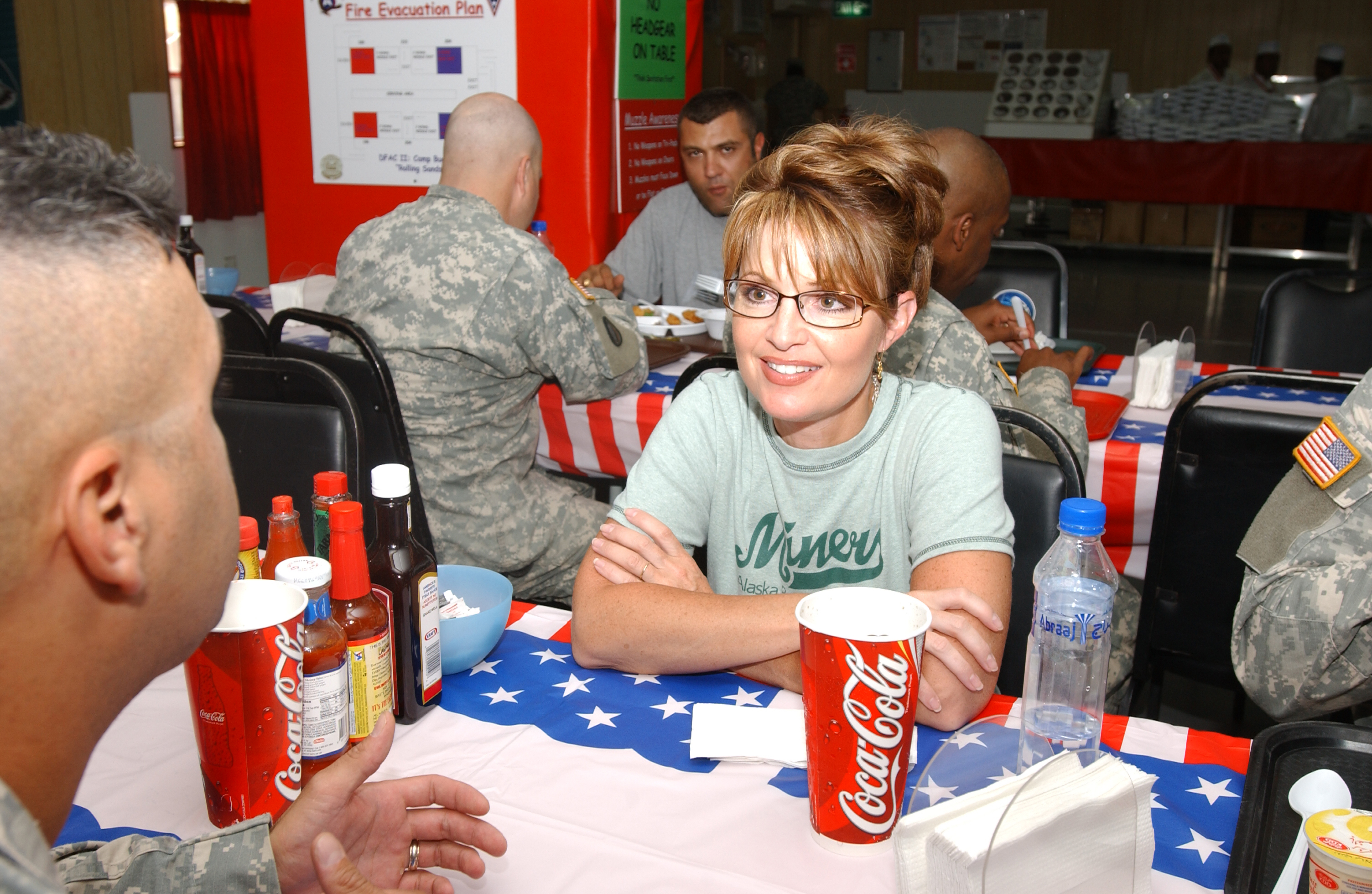
Palin in Kuwait visiting soldiers of the Alaska National Guard, July 24, 2007.

Palin followed through on a campaign promise to sell the Westwind II jet purchased (on a state government credit account, against the wishes of the Legislature) by the Murkowski administration for $2.7 million in 2005. In August 2007 the jet was listed on eBay; although with no buyer found on eBay, it was later sold for $2.1 million through a private brokerage firm to a campaign contributor.

She also canceled a contract for the construction of an 11-mile (18 km) gravel road outside Juneau to a mine, reversing a decision made in the closing days of the Murkowski administration.

In June 2007, Palin signed into law a $6.6 billion operating budget—the largest in Alaska's history. At the same time, she used her veto power to make the second-largest cuts of the construction budget in state history. The $237 million in cuts represented over 300 local projects and reduced the construction budget to nearly $1.6 billion. In 2008 Palin vetoed $286 million in funds for 350 projects from the FY09 capital budget, or 13% of the total budget. The Anchorage Daily News said the cuts "may be the biggest single-year line-item veto total in state history."

=== Personal ===
Palin lived in Juneau during the legislative session and lived in Wasilla and worked out of offices in Anchorage the rest of the year. Since the office in Anchorage is far from Juneau, while she worked there she was legally entitled to a $58 per diem travel allowance, which she has taken (a total of $16,951), and to reimbursement for hotels, which she did not, choosing instead to drive about 45 miles (72 km) from a state office in Anchorage to her home in Wasilla. In response to criticism for taking the per diem, and for $43,490 in travel expenses for the times her family accompanied her on state business, the governor's staffers said that these practices were in line with state policy, that Palin's gubernatorial expenses were 80% below those of her predecessor, Frank Murkowski, and that "many of the hundreds of invitations Palin receives include requests for her to bring her family, placing the definition of 'state business' with the party extending the invitation."

In December 2008, an Alaska state commission recommended increasing the governor's salary from $125,000 to $150,000. Palin stated that she would not accept the pay raise. In response, the commission dropped the recommendation.

=== Matanuska Maid Dairy ===
In April 2007, the state Board of Agriculture and Conservation (BAC) approved a request for $600,000 for a review of the operating expenses of the Matanuska Maid Dairy, an unprofitable state-owned business, and forwarded the request to the state legislature for funding. The Alaska Creamery Board, which oversaw the dairy and made the request, met in May and discussed privatizing or possibly closing the dairy. It subsequently voted to close the dairy and, on June 13, rejected Palin's public request that it keep the dairy open, saying it stood by its decision to close the dairy plant as July 7.

On June 18, Palin replaced the entire membership of the BAC, which then installed itself as the Creamery Board, and voted to keep the dairy open for 90 days while reviewing options. On August 29, 2007, Palin announced that the business could not be made profitable and would be offered for sale. She said that the board could use the $600,000 approved by the legislature in June to help with the transition to a private operator. In November, the dairy received the $600,000 legislative funding.

On December 7, with a required minimum bid of $3.35 million for the dairy, no bids were received, and all dairy operations were scheduled to close later that month. In August 2008, the Anchorage plant portion of the dairy was purchased for $1.5 million, the specified minimum bid. The new owners said that they planned to convert it to heated self-storage units. The sale of the company's bottle-making facility in Palmer was under consideration as of early September.

=== Bridge to Nowhere ===
In Palin's 2006 gubernatorial campaign, she supported the building of the proposed Gravina Island Bridge, which had been nicknamed the "Bridge to Nowhere" because the island had only 50 residents. The bridge was intended to provide access to Ketchikan International Airport and not the residential population of the island.

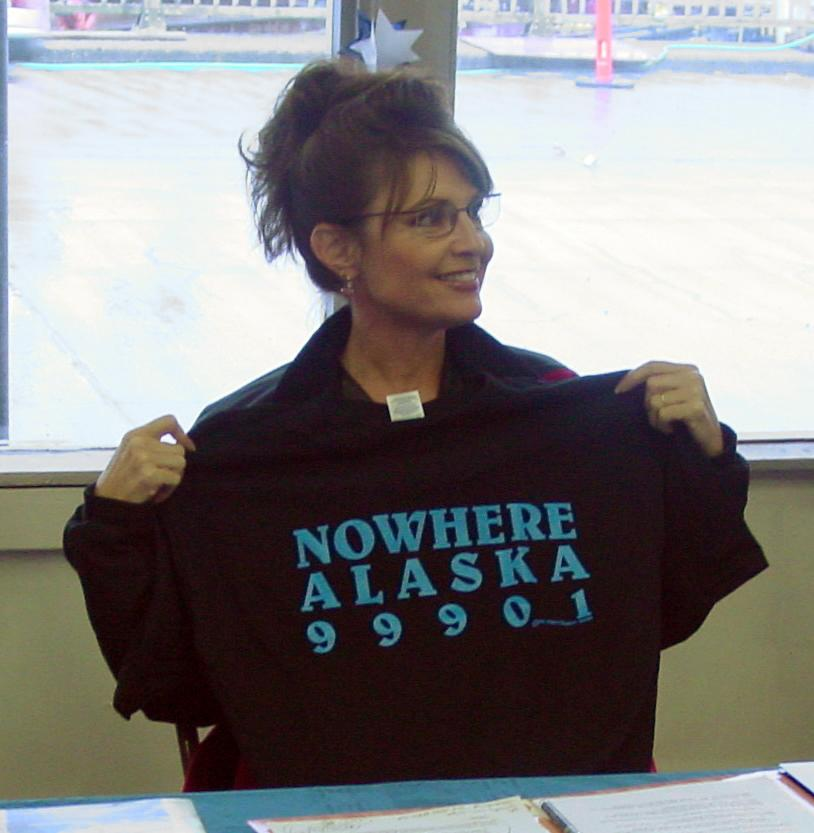
On September 20, 2006, Sarah Palin visited Ketchikan on her gubernatorial campaign and said the bridge was essential for the town's prosperity.

Members of the Alaskan congressional delegation, particularly Representative Don Young and Senator Ted Stevens, were the bridge's biggest advocates in Congress, and helped push for federal funding. The project encountered fierce opposition outside of Alaska as a symbol of pork barrel spending. In 2005, Congress stripped the specific earmark allocation of federal funds for the two bridges, without changing the amount of money allocated for use by Alaska. As a result, the money previously earmarked for this and another controversial project, the Knik Arm Bridge, a total of $442 million, was to be made available for transportation projects generally. The proposed Knik Arm Bridge is officially named "Don Young's Way" after Alaska Congressman Don Young, in the original legislation.

The next year, Palin ran for Governor on a "build-the-bridge" platform, arguing that it was essential for local prosperity. She said in August 2006: "We need to come to the defense of Southeast Alaska when proposals are on the table like the bridge, and not allow the spinmeisters to turn this project or any other into something that's so negative." In October 2006, when asked, "Would you continue state funding for the proposed Knik Arm and Gravina Island bridges?", she answered: "Yes. I would like to see Alaska's infrastructure projects built sooner rather than later. The window is now - while our congressional delegation is in a strong position to assist." She also criticized the use of the word "nowhere" as insulting to local residents.

Congress did not, however, reinstate the earmark for the bridge. In September 2007, with no federal money available, Palin removed the state's portion of the cost from her proposed budget. She stated:

Ketchikan desires a better way to reach the airport, but the $398 million bridge is not the answer. ... Despite the work of our congressional delegation, we are about $329 million short of full funding for the bridge project, and it's clear that Congress has little interest in spending any more money on a bridge between Ketchikan and Gravina Island. ... Much of the public's attitude toward Alaska bridges is based on inaccurate portrayals of the projects here. But we need to focus on what we can do, rather than fight over what has happened.

Her switch allowed the state to use the federal money for other transportation projects. Palin did, however, continue construction of an access road on Gravina Island, which would have linked to the bridge but now goes only to an empty beach; federal money for the access road, unlike the bridge money, would have otherwise been returned to the federal government.

According to Reuters, Palin's decision to cancel the bridge "earn[ed] her admirers from earmark critics and budget hawks from around the nation. The move also thrust her into the spotlight as a reform-minded newcomer." In an article titled, "Bridge leads McCain to running mate Palin", the Associated Press said canceling the bridge was "the first identifiable link connecting Palin and McCain," soon followed by "whispers of Palin being an ideal GOP running mate."

== Judicial appointments ==
While governor, Palin appointed two justices to the Alaska Supreme Court, Morgan Christen and Daniel Winfree. She resigned her governorship before filling a third vacancy, which was filled by incoming governor Sean Parnell with the appointment of Peter J. Maassen

== Resignation ==
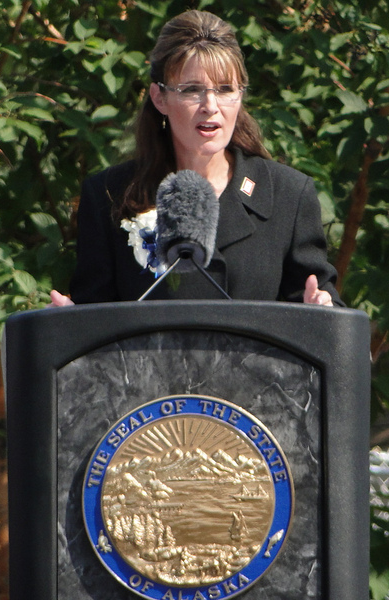
Sarah Palin gives farewell speech at Fairbanks' Pioneer Park

Palin announced she was resigning her office due to the costs and distractions of battling ethics investigations, describing the "insane" amount of time and money that both she and the state of Alaska had expended responding to "frivolous" legal ethics complaints filed against her. She said the state had spent $2 million while she and her husband, Todd, would be spending "more than half a million dollars in legal bills in order to set the record straight". The resignation took effect on July 26, 2009 with Sean Parnell sworn into office that day in Fairbanks.

On December 22, 2010, new rules governing Alaska executive branch ethics, stemming from Sarah Palin's tenure as governor, took effect:

These include allowing for the state to pay legal costs for officials cleared of ethics violations; allowing for a family member of the governor or the lieutenant governor to travel at state cost in certain circumstances and allowing an immediate family member to use an official's state-issued cell phone or BlackBerry if the usage is limited or under monthly or unlimited plans.

The Alaska Attorney General clarified several ethics rules, including those related to family travel.

== See also ==
- Early political career of Sarah Palin
- Electoral history of Sarah Palin
- Political positions of Sarah Palin
