= Alaska salmon fishery =

Fishery of salmon in Alaska

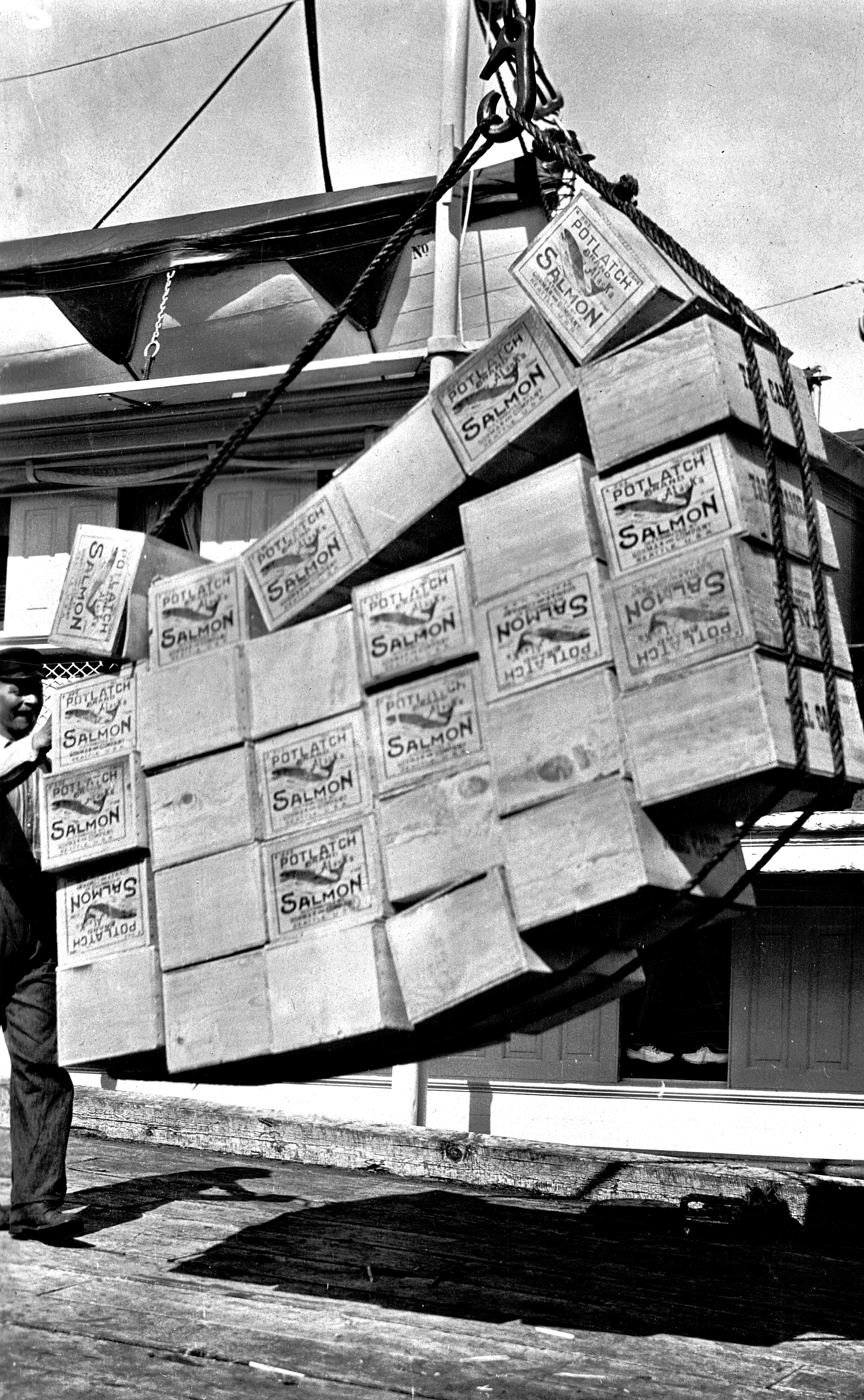
Boxes of salmon on a hoist in Petersburg, Alaska ca. 1915

The Alaska salmon fishery is a managed fishery that supports the annual harvest of five species of wild Pacific salmon for commercial fishing, sport fishing, subsistence by Alaska Native communities, and personal use by local residents. The salmon harvest in Alaska is the largest in North America and represents about 80% of the total wild-caught catch, with harvests from Canada and the Pacific Northwest representing the remainder In 2017 over 200 million salmon were caught in Alaskan waters by commercial fishers, representing $750 million in exvessel value. Salmon fishing is a nearly ubiquitous activity across Alaska, however the most valuable salmon fisheries are in the Bristol Bay, Prince William Sound and Southeast regions.

Overfishing in the middle of the 20th century led to a precipitous decline in stocks and the development of a comprehensive fisheries management system overseen by the Alaska Department of Fish and Game. Stocks have since rebounded and the Alaska salmon fishery has been certified as sustainable by the Marine Stewardship Council since 2000.

== History ==
Salmon have been an important source of food in Alaska for Native Communities for millennia. Alaska did not always have healthy stocks of salmon. The salmon catch grew rapidly with the expansion of the cannery capacity through 1920. This led to over fishing, which resulted in such low salmon stocks that President Eisenhower declared Alaska a federal disaster area in 1953. In fact, in 1959, statewide harvests totaled only about 25 million salmon, which is less than 20% of current sustained production. This was a major factor in the declines of the Alaska salmon fishery that occurred between 1920 and 1959. Alaska achieved statehood in the year of 1959. After analysis, it was clear that the reason for the decline was the lack of implementation of the federal policies in place before statehood. Furthermore, the Federal government failed to provide the financial resources needed to manage and research salmon stocks and fisheries such that fishing could be regulated and depressed stocks could be rehabilitated. The decline was temporarily arrested after Alaska became a state and instituted new conservation measures. However, the inexorable entry of more technological fishing gear coincided with further decline to record low levels in 1972. This decline helped promote the enclosure of the salmon fishery in 1973 under a limited entry permit system. Since then the catch has rebounded to near-record levels due to Alaska's salmon management.

== Species ==
There are five species of Pacific Salmon of economic importance in Alaska: Chinook, Sockeye, Coho, Pink and Chum.

== Policies ==
=== Federal management to State management ===
Anvik River chum salmon
| Year | Escapement | Return |
|---|---|---|
| 1972 | 457,800 | 362,587 |
| 1973 | 249,015 | 856,936 |
| 1974 | 411,133 | 1,338,657 |
| 1975 | 900,967 | 843,132 |
| 1976 | 511,475 | 2,926,444 |
| 1977 | 358,771 | 1,321,297 |
| 1900 | 307,270 | 1,187,305 |
| 1979 | 280,537 | 979,514 |
| 1980 | 492,676 | 1,744,558 |
| 1981 | 1,486,182 | 2,779,191 |
| 1982 | 444,581 | 988,061 |
| 1983 | 362,912 | 1,220,480 |
| 1984 | 891,028 | 2,928,193 |
| 1985 | 1,080,243 | 1,141,620 |
| 1986 | 1,189,602 | 1,203,267 |
| 1987 | 455,876 | 1,480,599 |
| 1988 | 1,125,449 | 628,815 |
| 1989 | 636,906 | 1,318,363 |
| 1990 | 403,627 | 1,300,412 |
| 1991 | 847,772 | 1,588,212 |
| 1992 | 775,626 | 1,233,719 |
| 1993 | 517,409 | 467,159 |

Alaska changed from federal management of its fisheries to state management in 1959. Alaska's constitution has an article regarding the management and utilization of the state's natural resources. Article VIII, Section 4 states: “Fish, forests, wildlife, grasslands, and all other replenishable resources belonging to the State shall be utilized, developed, and maintained on the sustained yield principle, subject to preferences among beneficial uses.” The Alaska Department of Fish and Game was formed when Alaska became a state. While the Alaska Department of Fish and Game was formed with a strong conservation mandate to manage salmon fisheries for sustained yield, the Alaska Board of Fisheries, on the other hand, was given the responsibility for allocating that yield of salmon to users. The clear separation of primary conservation authority from allocation authority is one of the strengths of the Alaskan fishery management system.

The dominant goal is the harvest policy known as “fixed escapement,” or ensuring that sufficient numbers of adult spawning salmon escape capture in the fishery and are allowed to spawn in the rivers, thus maintaining the long-term health of the stocks. Salmon managers open and close fisheries on a daily basis to ensure that adequate spawning escapements are achieved. When run failures occur, managers close fisheries to provide for predetermined escapement needs and therefore ensure long-term sustainable yields. When run strength is strong, managers liberalize harvest regulations to utilize surpluses. Alaska's focused emphasis on in-season management by local biologists with delegated regulatory authority to ensure sustained yields is a key ingredient to successful salmon management.

=== Limited Entry Act ===
Alaska has succeeded in sustainable yield management of its salmon fisheries since the enclosure of the salmon fishery in 1973 under a limited entry permit system. The Alaskan legislature adopted the Limited Entry Act, establishing the current limited entry system for the salmon fisheries. The Commercial Fisheries Entry Commission (CFEC) administers the commercial fishery entry permit system. The objective of the CFEC is to “limit entry into commercial fisheries and provide annual licensing and permitting of fisheries to facilitate the management and development of fishery resources for maximum benefit of those dependent upon them and the economy of the state.” Some key features of the program are to prohibit permit leasing, prevent the use of permits as collateral for loans, and allow for free transferability. The Limited Entry law also defined entry permits as a use-privilege that can be modified by the legislature without compensation. Free transferability has resulted in maintaining high percentages of residents within Alaska's fisheries and has been upheld by Alaska's Supreme Court. They are a property right of the holder and may be sold, bought and are heritable.

The limited entry permit system has been beneficial to Alaska's fisheries in several ways. Implementation of the Limited Entry Act protected Alaska's fisheries from an influx of new fishermen from West Coast fisheries where fishing opportunities have been severely reduced by court decisions and stock conditions. Net economic benefits have accrued that may not have existed under open access. In reference to salmon populations, the permit system has been vastly successful in increasing populations (Figure 1).

=== The Pacific Salmon Treaty ===
The Pacific Salmon Treaty (PST), ratified in 1985, is an agreement between the United States, Canada, Washington State, and Oregon State to regulate fishing along the coast from Cape Falcon, Oregon, to Cape Suckling, Alaska. The treaty was designed to prevent overfishing along key salmon migration routes, ensure equitable sharing of salmon stocks, and protect existing fisheries.

The treaty is implemented by the Pacific Salmon Commission (PSC), which was established in 1985. The PSC has 16 members, with four commissioners and four alternates from each country. These members represent various stakeholders, including commercial and recreational fisheries as well as federal, state, and tribal governments. The treaty contains four chapters relevant to Alaska:

Chapter 1: Transboundary Rivers

Chapter 2: Northern Boundary

Chapter 3: Chinook Salmon

Chapter 8: Yukon River

Chapters 1, 2, and 8 primarily involve bilateral arrangements between Alaska and Canada under the PST framework. Chapter 3, however, encompasses a broader coast-wide agreement concerning Chinook salmon, covering the region from Yakutat, Alaska, to Cape Falcon, Oregon.

The treaty’s initial 10-year agreement expired in the mid-1990s, leading to significant fishing disputes. Therefore, a renewed 10-year agreement was signed in 1999, followed by subsequent agreements in 2009 and 2019.

During the 2019 agreements, Alaska agreed to reduce Chinook salmon harvests by up to 7.5%, while Canada committed to a 12.5% reduction. These cuts were motivated by ongoing declines in Chinook populations. The Alaska Department of Fish and Game adjusts annual catch limits each year in accordance with the latest treaty provisions.

== Alternative explanations ==
It is relatively clear that the reason for increased populations of salmon fisheries was the conversion to state management in 1959 and then the limited entry permit system in 1973. However, viable alternative explanations always exist.

The most important change that showed instant increases in salmon populations was the enactment of the Magnusson Stevens Act in 1976 that moved the jurisdiction of Alaskan waters out from 12 miles to the 200 mile limit, effectively excluding foreign fleets from fishing within these American waters. This and sustainable escapement goals that allowed salmon to reach their wild spawning river systems allowed the salmon to return and reproduce naturally so that wild systems recovered from the over fishing, creek robbing, and the serious cold winter temperatures of the early 1970s so prevalent leading to the recovery of stocks seen all over Alaska without any artificial propagation.

One explanation often used is the enhancement of salmon due to the start of the hatchery program in 1971. But the salmon began to recover long before hatcheries began releases in the late 1970s. Modern salmon hatcheries in Alaska were developed too late in response to record low wild-stock runs in the 1970s so millions of dollars were wasted in building these expensive infrastructures. Initially conceived as state-run systems, paid for with Alaska general fund dollars. Today most Alaskan hatcheries are now run by private non-profit organizations but are controversial because of claims of massive straying into wild streams and competition with wild stocks. Presently there is no credible evidence that Southeast hatchery chum salmon have a deleterious impact on Western Alaska stocks. Alaska now has 33 production hatcheries in a program designed to enhance fisheries but is masking the maintenance of healthy wild stocks. Some hatcheries release over 100 million juvenile salmon annually, competing with the wild out migrating Smolt. Statewide totals are 1.2 to 1.4 billion annually over the last decade. During the past decade, hatcheries have produced 27-63 million adults annually, accounting for 14-37% of lower valued salmon in the statewide commercial salmon harvest. 40% of these salmon are only stripped for their eggs and the carcass thrown away. The high valued preferred wild sockeye are 66-86%, contributing to the majority of the value for the state of Alaska coming from the wild naturally spawning salmon (Figure 2). These high percentages of wild salmon help show that the massive increase in salmon populations was due to the policies implemented during statehood and the entry of the limited permit system, as well as the Magnusson Stevens Act and the climatic shift favoring salmon. Therefore, the natural cycles and strict management to protect American waters is an alternative explanation to the recovering salmon population surge.

== Stocks of concern ==
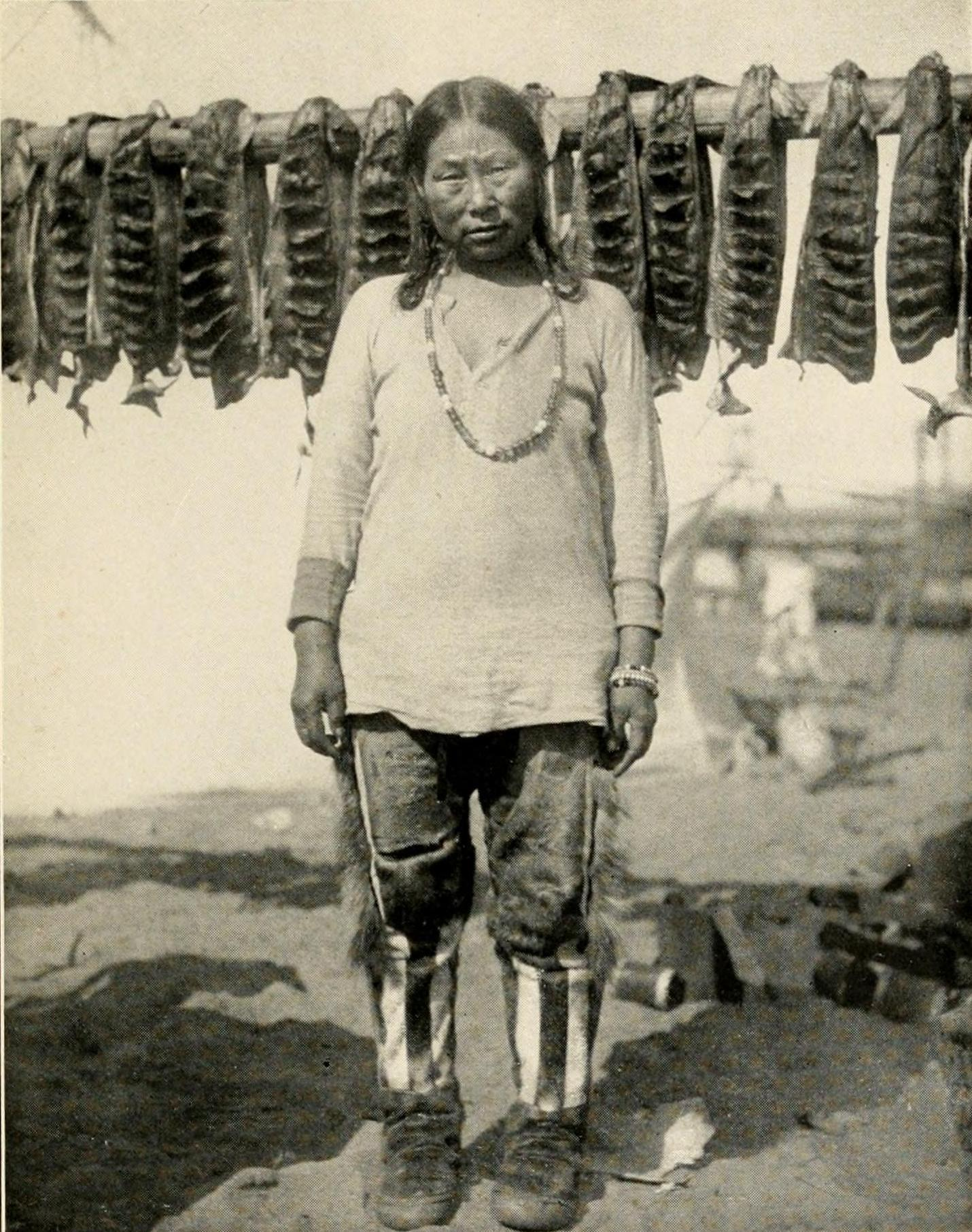
Kow-Ear-Nuk and salmon catch, early 1900s

The Alaskan Board of Fisheries identified six “stocks of concern” in late 2000, categorizing them as having yield concern. This is defined as “a chronic inability (over four to five years, despite use of specific management measures) to maintain yields or harvestable surplus above escapement needs.”

- Kuskokwim chinook salmon
- Kuskokwim chum salmon
- Yukon fall chum salmon (except Toklat and Fishing Branch stocks)
- Yukon chinook salmon
- Golovin Bay & Moses Pt. chum salmon
- Kvichak sockeye salmon

== Areas of concern ==
=== Yukon River ===
In 2001 commercial fishing of the Alaskan Portion of the Yukon River was closed, due to poor runs recorded in the previous years. The 2006 Joint Technical Committee of the Yukon River US/Canada Panel documented the size and sex composition of Yukon River chinook salmon and found “limited, but suggestive” evidence that the fish morphology has changed. Specific findings included a decrease in the mean weight of commercial harvests, a reduction in the prevalence of the largest fish, and the apparent near disappearance of age-8 fish. The committee also reported that mean length-at-age, another important metric, had not substantially changed. In addition to changes in physical characteristics of Chinook salmon, a protozoan pathogen (Ichthyophonus sp.), not previously present in the Yukon River began appearing in increasing numbers of fish. First reported in 1988 the parasite prevalence increased continually until it peaked at a 40% in 2003-2004. During this time it was reported that up to 60% of infected fish died before they could successfully spawn. Beginning in 2004 the infection prevalence has decreased in parallel with a decrease in the Chinook population. Causes of these changes, whether environmental or fishery-induced, were not clear and the committee found expanded monitoring was needed.

== See also ==
- Alaska Packers' Association
