= Alaskan Board of Fisheries =

Government organisation in Alaska

The Alaska Board of Fisheries consists of seven members who serve three-year terms. Members are appointed by the governor and approved by the legislature. The Board of Fisheries was established under Alaska Statute 16.05.221. While the Alaska Department of Fish and Game was established when Alaska became a state in 1959, the Board of Fisheries was not established until 1975 with the goal of allocating salmon to users. The State Legislature split the Board of Fish and Game into two separate boards: the Board of Game and the Board of Fisheries.

The Board accepts proposals with regard to changes to subsistence, personal use, sport, guided sport, and commercial fishing regulations. Under the subsistence proposal policy, 5 AAC 96.615, the Board can consider subsistence proposals for all topics. The board is to provide a "local forum for the collection and expression of regional opinions on fish and game issues. The advisory committees provide the boards with recommendations for regulatory changes and resource allocations."

== Current Board members ==
- Tom Carpenter
- Curt Chamberlain
- Märit Carlson-Van Dort
- Greg Svendsen
- Gerad Godfrey
- Olivia Henaayee Irwin
- Mike Wood
