= Alaska Wildlife Alliance =

Non-profit organization working on protection Alaskan wildlife

- Abbreviation: AWA
- Formation: 1978; 48 years ago
- Type: Nonprofit
- Tax ID no.: 92-0073877
- Legal status: 501(c)(3)
- Headquarters: Anchorage, Alaska
- Board President: Carol Damberg
- Executive Director: Nicole Schmitt
- Website: https://www.akwildlife.org/

The Alaska Wildlife Alliance (AWA) is a non-profit organization that was founded in 1978 in Anchorage, Alaska. It has dedicated its efforts and funds to protect Alaskan wildlife for its intrinsic value and to benefit the present and future generations. With the initial goal to identify, research and monitor issues affecting marine mammals and endangered species, increase public understanding of environmental issues, and develop programs to aid in the protection of marine mammals and other endangered species, AWA has expanded its focus to monitoring and influencing state wildlife management policies. AWA has also earned notoriety through its efforts to curtail aerial wolf hunting, restrict predator control programs, and protect and restore Alaska's endangered species. They also support ethical hunting and fair chase concepts, believing that the practices of unethical hunting and not allowing fair chase both jeopardizes future hunting opportunities and degrades Alaska's wildlife population.

AWA published quarterly magazines called The Spirit, later renamed Echoes. These Quarterlies published articles from all over Alaska. Currently, AWA develops monthly newsletters, action alerts, and Wildlife Wednesday programming.

== Mission ==
AWA advocates for the ethical and scientific management of ecosystems, allowing them to thrive in biodiversity. They promote:

- Sustainable population of all wildlife species in Alaska, including wolves, bears, moose, and caribou
- Balanced wildlife management, based on sound science and strong ethical/fair chase standards
- Expansion of sustainable and diverse wildlife viewing opportunities
- Protection and recovery of Alaska's endangered species
- Healthy coexistence between wildlife and humans in urban and rural communities
- Preservation of important wildlife habitat through Alaska
- Educational programs with a focus on preserving Alaska's wildlife and wild places

== Projects ==
AWA actively pursues the creation and implementation of their goals as an organization through various projects. Currently, they have three main goals: ensure scientifically sound and humane wildlife management, develop a novel climate change adaptation program, and inform Alaska's citizenry to speak up for wildlife.

=== Shifting the Wildlife Paradigm ===
AWA seeks to have a regular presence, build strategic alliances, publish position papers, and facilitate alternative and inclusive governance models.

=== Coordinating Responses to Threats ===
AWA actively seeks relief from policies that impact wildlife while also conducting regulatory analyses to determine management trends. They also submit public comments and fact sheets with the goal to hold agencies accountable for decisions made on unrealistic assumptions.

=== Informing Alaskan Public Policy to Recognize Climate Change ===
AWA advocates for climate change models to be considered in all state wildlife management policies while also seeking to educate decision makers on the impacts of climate change.

=== Collaboratively Develop Innovative Climate Adaptation Plans Across Alaska that are Founded in Ecosystem Management ===
AWA aims to promote decision frameworks that demand ecosystem and landscape-scaled context, promote field experiments to validate modeled ecological trajectories, and build alliances to facilitate the development of pilot studies that demonstrate climate change adaptation approaches.

=== Build a Network of Informed Alaskans ===
AWA constantly seeks to expand their membership, educate Alaskans, develop and promote citizen science opportunities, and increase coexistence efforts.

== Programs ==
AWA currently focuses its efforts on several programs designed to bring awareness to the preservation of Alaska's wilderness.

=== Voices for Wildlife ===
Through this program, AWA aims to give a voice to wildlife through promoting ethical management practices, encouraging public participation in wildlife management policies, establish fair representation on the Alaska Board of Game, and speaking up to protect habitats. Their goal with Voices for Wildlife is to sustainably manage Alaska's wildlife for present and future generations to enjoy.

=== Education and Outreach ===
AWA believes that it is important to educate communities across Alaska on the many wildlife issues. Through education, they want to make communities better equipped to enjoy and protect the wildlife around them. AWA hosts a free presentation in both Anchorage and Juneau called Wildlife Wednesdays; a presentation that features a different wildlife topic presented by a wildlife expert every week. AWA also develops partnerships with other programs that allow its members to participate in a scientific study of Alaska's wildlife, a program they call Citizen Science Programs.

=== Conservation Coalitions ===
AWA is constantly looking to partner with other conservation and wildlife organizations. They believe that there is strength and numbers, and because of this they push to build a community that can stand together to make change.

=== Denali Wolf Documentary ===
Teaming up with filmmaker Ramey Newell, AWA aims to shed light on the ongoing controversy surrounding the hunting and trapping of wolves at the boundary of Denali National Park. This film will also explore the often misconstrued complexities and difficulties of balancing human interests on public lands, an issue constantly effecting widespread United States.

== History of Litigation ==
- 2017 - Alaska v. Zinke
- 2010 - West v. State Board of Game
- 2004 - Alaska Center for Environment v. Rue
- 2003 - Alaska Wildlife Alliance v. State
- 2001 - National Parks and Conservation Ass'n v. Babbitt
- 1999 - Brooks v. Wright
- 1999 - Alaska Center for Environment v. US Forest Service
- 1999 - Alaska State Snowmobile Ass'n V. Babbitt
- 1997 - Alaska Wildlife Alliance v. Rue
- 1997 - Alaska Wildlife Alliance v. Jensen
- 1997 - Alaska Center for Environment v. Armbrister
- 1992 - Didrickson v. US Dept. of Interior
