= Early political career of Sarah Palin =

Sarah Palin was a member of the City Council of Wasilla, Alaska from 1992 to 1996 and the city's mayor from 1996 to 2002. Wasilla is located 29 miles (47 km) north-east of the port of Anchorage, and is the largest population center in the Mat-Su Valley. At the conclusion of Palin's tenure as mayor in 2002, the city had about 6,300 residents, and is now the fifth largest city in the state. Term limits prevented Palin from running for a third term as mayor.

== City Council of Wasilla ==
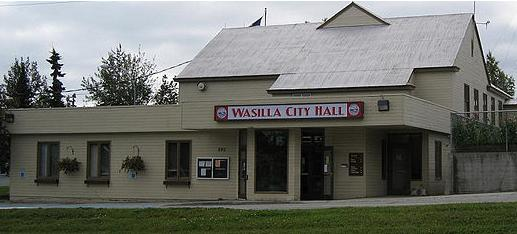
Wasilla City Hall

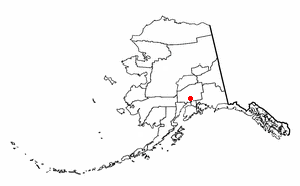
Location of Wasilla, Alaska

Palin was elected twice to the City Council of Wasilla, Alaska, in 1992 and 1995. Wasilla's city councillors serve three-year terms. Palin says she entered politics because she was concerned that revenue from a new Wasilla sales tax would not be spent wisely.

Palin's first foray into politics was in 1992, when the then 28-year-old ran for Wasilla city council against John Hartrick, a local telephone company worker. She won 530 votes against Hartrick's 310. On the council, she successfully opposed a measure to curtail the hours at Wasilla's bars by two hours. This surprised Hartrick because she was then a member of a church that advocated abstinence from alcohol. After serving on the city council for three years, she ran for reelection against R'nita Rogers in 1995, winning 413 votes to Rogers' 185. Palin did not complete her second term on the city council because she ran for mayor in 1996.

=== Remark about library book ===
According to Laura Chase of Wasilla, and former Wasilla Mayor John Stein, Palin mentioned in 1995 that she saw the book Daddy's Roommate in the public library and did not think that it belonged there. Chase later became Palin's campaign manager for mayor in 1996, when Palin defeated John Stein, but Chase had a falling out with Palin and then became a vocal critic.

City of Wasilla Library records indicate that there was never a request for the library to remove the book and that no books were ever censored or banned. A New York Times article in 2008 mentioned the Daddy's Roommate episode, and intimated that the episode is relevant to accusations that Palin may be sympathetic to censorship. The Times article was subsequently criticized by the Times' own ombudsman for presenting "confusing and incomplete" anecdotes about Palin.

The McCain-Palin campaign said that Palin was not advocating censorship. Eventually, the Wasilla Library did remove the book in question, according to Kathy Martin-Albright who became library director in 2005: "The books were removed as part of ongoing collection development and not due to the subject matter presented in the books."

== 1996 campaign for Wasilla Mayor ==
The duties of Wasilla's Mayor are more circumscribed than those of many other mayors in the United States. Firefighting and schools are overseen by the Matanuska-Susitna Borough government, and the state government handles social services and environmental regulation, such as storm water management for building projects. Palin told the Mat-Su Valley Frontiersman that she could handle the job of Mayor without any assistance from veteran town officials: "It's not rocket science. It's $6 million and 53 employees."

In 1996, Palin had been serving on the Wasilla City Council for four years, and decided to run for Mayor. She defeated three-term incumbent John Stein, running on a platform of "fresh ideas and energy".

In the campaign, she vowed to replace "stale leadership" and criticized Stein for wasteful spending and high taxes. Palin also introduced national and state political debates into the race on issues such as abortion, gun rights, and term limits into the race. Although the mayoral election was non-partisan, the state Republican party ran advertisements on her behalf. Palin did not brandish her religious views during that campaign, but did play up her church work. A local cable TV program referred to Palin as Wasilla's first "Christian Mayor," which prompted an objection from Stein who noted that he and several previous Mayors of Wasilla were Christian.

== First mayoral term ==
Upon taking office in October 1996, she began to make staffing changes. She eliminated the position of museum director and asked for updated resumes and resignation letters from Wasilla police chief Irl Stambaugh, public works director Jack Felton, finance director Duane Dvorak, and librarian Mary Ellen Emmons. She temporarily required department heads to get her approval before talking to reporters, stating they first needed to become better acquainted with her policies. As promised during her campaign, she reduced her own salary by 10%, from $68,000 to $61,200; she also reduced her workload by hiring a new City Administrator. By 1999, the City Council had raised her salary back to $68,000. In her first term, state Republican party leaders began grooming her for higher office. Her recollection was that she "grew tremendously in my early months as mayor". Palin would gain favor with Wasillans. She kept a jar with the names of Wasilla residents on her desk, and once a week she pulled a name from it and picked up the phone. She would ask: "How's the city doing?"

=== Police department matters ===
Palin gave a signed letter to Police Chief Stambaugh on January 30, 1997 stating: "I do not feel I have your full support in my efforts to govern the city of Wasilla. Therefore I intend to terminate your employment." Palin spoke with Stambaugh at least three times about his continued service, but ultimately he was fired as planned. Stambaugh filed a lawsuit claiming discrimination and that his dismissal was politically motivated. The lawsuit was later dismissed by a court that found the mayor has the right to fire city employees even for political reasons or for no reason at all and ordered Stambaugh to pay $22,000 of Palin's legal expenses.

As mayor of Wasilla, Palin was in charge of the city Police Department, consisting of 25 officers and Chief of Police, Charlie Fannon. She was credited with strengthening the Police Department. She would later come into conflict with Fannon when he ran for political office using campaign ads containing a false endorsement from Palin. Palin actually supported another candidate, Curt Menard.

=== Taxes and spending ===
Due to income generated by a 2% sales tax that was enacted prior to her election, Palin was able to cut property taxes by 75% and to eliminate personal property and business inventory taxes. She also secured funding for improvements to the roads and sewers. She reduced spending on the town museum and prevented building of a new library and city hall, while putting in bike paths, and she was able to get funding for storm-water treatment in order to protect the region's many lakes.

== Campaign for reelection in 1999 ==
Palin ran for re-election against Stein in 1999 and was returned to office by a margin of 909 to 292 votes. Palin was also elected president of the Alaska Conference of Mayors.

Palin wore a Buchanan button during a visit by presidential candidate Pat Buchanan in 1999, but Palin was a co-chair on the Alaska campaign of rival presidential candidate Steve Forbes in 2000. Shortly after wearing the Buchanan button, Palin responded to a newspaper article about it: "When presidential candidates visit our community, I am always happy to meet them. I'll even put on their button when handed one as a polite gesture of respect ... The article may have left your readers with the perception that I am endorsing this candidate, as opposed to welcoming his visit to Wasilla."

== Second mayoral term ==
=== Taxes, borrowing and spending ===
According to Dianne M. Keller, who served on the city council when Palin was mayor and would later serve as mayor herself, Wasilla's budgets and tax receipts increased during Palin's terms as mayor, but much of that increase was caused by growth of the city. In the last two years of Palin's mayoralty alone, Wasilla's population grew roughly 13%. Democratic activist Anne Kilkenny claimed that during Palin's six years as mayor, general government expenditures increased by over 33%, while city taxes went up by 38%.

The property tax rate fell from 2 mils to .5 mils under Palin. The sales tax rate increased from 2 percent to 2.5 percent (and was changed to include everything, even food purchases), and that increase was approved by voter referendum to pay off the city's new sports complex. Voters also approved a bond issue for road improvements. According to PolitiFact, when Palin took office, she inherited a long-term city debt of just over a million dollars and that debt increased to about $25 million by the time she left office. The big-ticket items responsible for the debt were: $14.7 million for the new multi-use sports complex; $5.5 million for street projects; and $3 million for water improvement projects. Because of economic growth, Keller anticipates that Wasilla can stop charging the extra .5 percent sales tax two years sooner than expected.

Overall, Palin's two-term tenure saw the city add several million in long-term debt through the issuance of municipal bonds. Its bond debts included $15 million to fund a sports complex project that Palin was a proponent of.

=== Sports complex ===
During her second term as mayor, Palin introduced a ballot measure proposing construction of a municipal sports center to be financed by the 0.5% sales tax increase. The $14.7 million Curtis D. Menard Memorial Sports Center was built on time and under its construction budget, but cost the city an additional $1.3 million due to an eminent domain lawsuit caused by a failure to obtain legal ownership of the property before beginning construction.

In 2001, the judge hearing the initial property dispute had ruled for the city and the city's attorney advised the city to proceed with construction; subsequently the judge reversed himself and ruled that the city had never signed the proper papers.

=== Federal funding ===
During her second term, Palin joined with nearby communities in jointly hiring the Anchorage-based firm of Robertson, Monagle & Eastaugh to lobby for earmarks for Wasilla. The effort was led by Steven Silver, a former chief of staff for Senator Ted Stevens, and the firm secured nearly $27 million in earmarked funds for public and private entities in the Matanuska-Susitna Borough, but only $7.95 million of that amount went to the Wasilla city government. Earmarks from the firm included $500,000 for a youth shelter, $1.9 million for a transportation hub, $900,000 for sewer repairs, and $15 million for a rail project linking Wasilla and the ski resort community of Girdwood.

== Mayoral succession ==
In 2002, term limits prevented Palin from seeking a third term as mayor. Palin endorsed Dianne Keller in the race to succeed her as mayor. Keller won the election, defeating four opponents. The runner-up in the election was Palin's own stepmother-in-law, Faye Palin, who was reportedly at ideological odds with Palin (being pro-choice and a Democrat).

== Post-mayoral years ==
In 2002, Palin ran for the Republican nomination for lieutenant governor, coming in second to Loren Leman in a five-way Republican primary. The Republican ticket of U.S. Senator Frank Murkowski and Leman won the November 2002 election. When Murkowski resigned from his long-held U.S. Senate seat in December 2002 to become governor, he considered appointing Palin to replace him in the Senate, but chose his daughter, Lisa Murkowski, who was then an Alaskan state representative.

Governor Murkowski appointed Palin to the Alaska Oil and Gas Conservation Commission. She chaired the Commission beginning in 2003, serving as Ethics Supervisor. Palin resigned in January 2004, protesting what she called the "lack of ethics" of fellow Republican members.

After resigning, Palin filed a formal complaint against Oil and Gas Conservation Commissioner Randy Ruedrich, also the chair of the state Republican Party, accusing him of doing work for the party on public time and of working closely with a company he was supposed to be regulating. She also joined with Democratic legislator Eric Croft to file a complaint against Gregg Renkes, a former Alaskan Attorney General, accusing him of having a financial conflict of interest in negotiating a coal exporting trade agreement, while Renkes was the subject of investigation and after records suggesting a possible conflict of interest had been released to the public. Ruedrich and Renkes both resigned and Ruedrich paid a record $12,000 fine. From 2003 to June 2005, Palin served as one of three directors of "Ted Stevens Excellence in Public Service, Inc.," a 527 group designed to provide political training for Republican women in Alaska. In 2004, Palin told the Anchorage Daily News that she had decided not to run for the U.S. Senate that year, against the Republican incumbent, Lisa Murkowski, because her teenage son opposed it. Palin said, "How could I be the team mom if I was a U.S. Senator?"

== See also ==
- Governorship of Sarah Palin
- Electoral history of Sarah Palin
- Political positions of Sarah Palin
