= Anchorage Coastal Wildlife Refuge =

Coordinates: 61°06′11″N 149°54′11″W

Time lapse video of the Anchorage Coastal Wildlife Refuge in winter

The Anchorage Coastal Wildlife Refuge is a wildlife refuge located in the Anchorage Municipality.

== Location ==
The Anchorage Coastal Wildlife Refuge is located on a 16-mile-long section of coastline in Anchorage, Alaska, stretching from Point Woronzof to Potter Creek. The vast majority of the refuge is located on intertidal floodplains of glacial silt, with a smaller portion consisting of coastal wetlands, bogs, wooded areas, and Potter Marsh, a popular wildlife viewing area.

== Wildlife ==
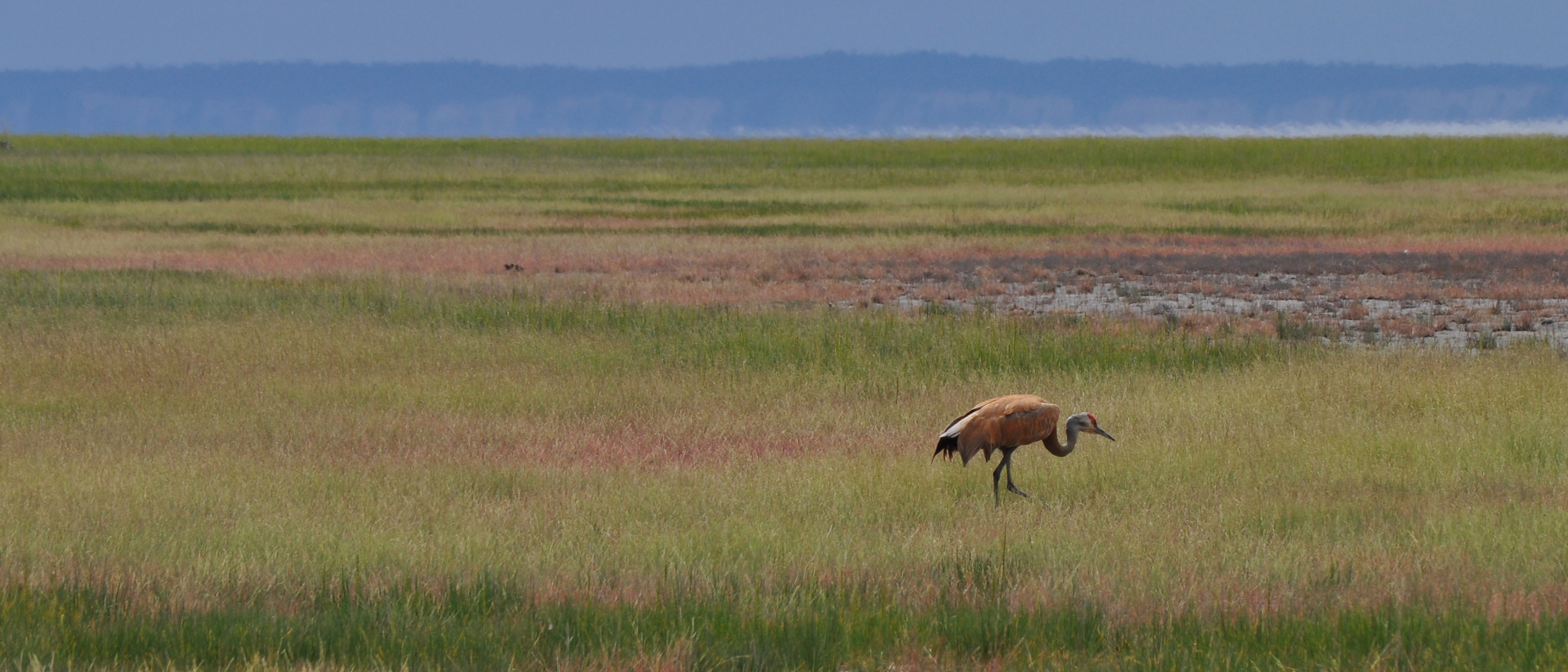
A migratory sandhill crane in the Anchorage Coastal Wildlife Refuge

The Anchorage Coastal Wildlife Refuge is a seasonal home for many migratory bird species, including grebes, swans, Canada geese, yellowlegs, and northern phalaropes. Eagles, moose, porcupines, and, less frequently, black bears inhabit the wooded areas closer to shore. While the glacial silt plains are generally devoid of visible life, they are traversed by thousands of salmon every year when much of the refuge becomes submerged at high tide.

== Recreation ==
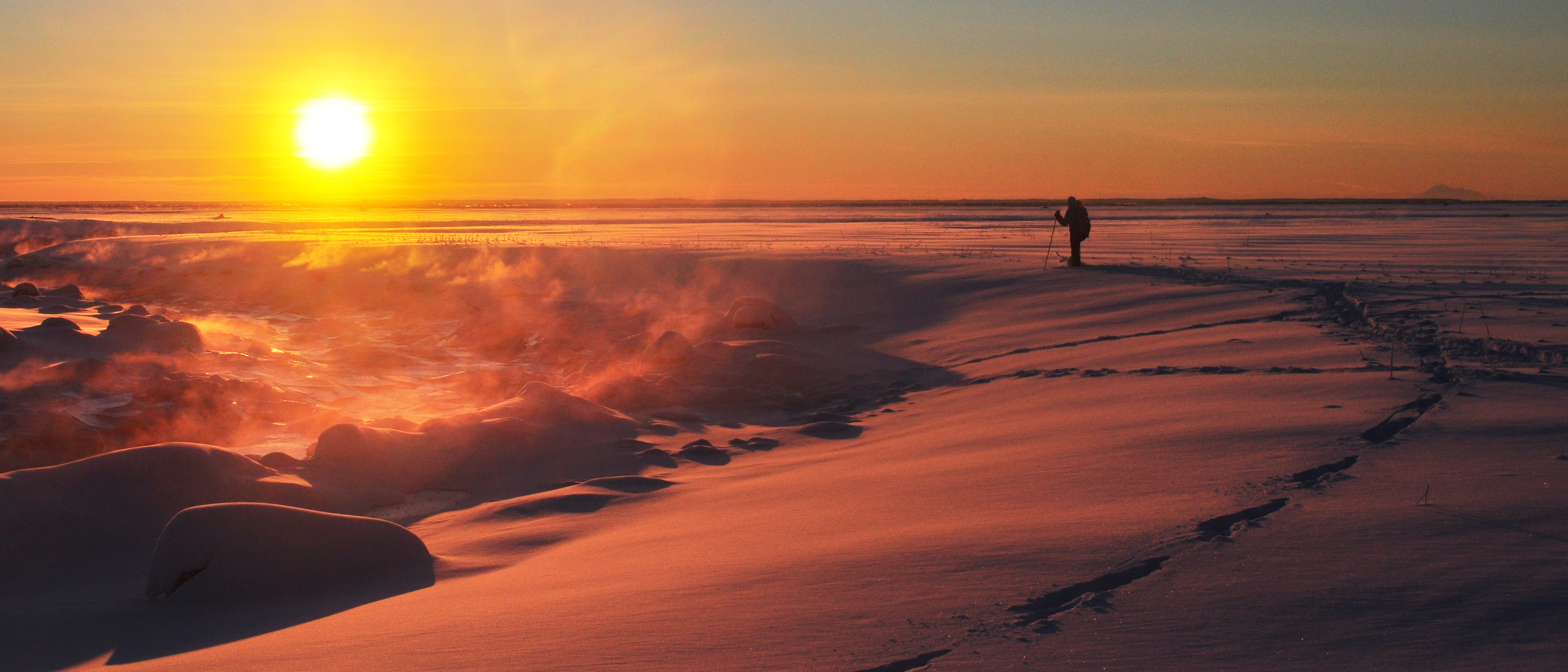
A skier near the mouth of Campbell Creek, which crosses the refuge and empties into Turnagain Arm

The refuge is open to the public year-round. Popular activities include birdwatching, hunting, trapping, fishing, camping, hiking, snow-shoeing, and cross-country skiing. Potter Marsh is open during the winter for ice skating. Despite its proximity to urban Anchorage, public access to much of the refuge is limited to unmarked trails through wooded areas, and the glacial silt floodplains that make up most of the refuge can be dangerous. Toward its southern end near Potter Marsh, the refuge sits directly behind an active rifle range. Though not illegal, traveling across that portion is dangerous and disruptive to shooters.

== Controversy ==
Usage of the Anchorage Coastal Wildlife Refuge has been a topic of continuing controversy. Repeated attempts to extend the Anchorage Coastal Trail through the refuge have been opposed by various groups, including wildlife enthusiasts and homeowners whose property abuts the refuge.
