= Potter Marsh =

Wetland and wildlife viewing in Alaska

Coordinates: 61°06′38″N 149°47′44″W

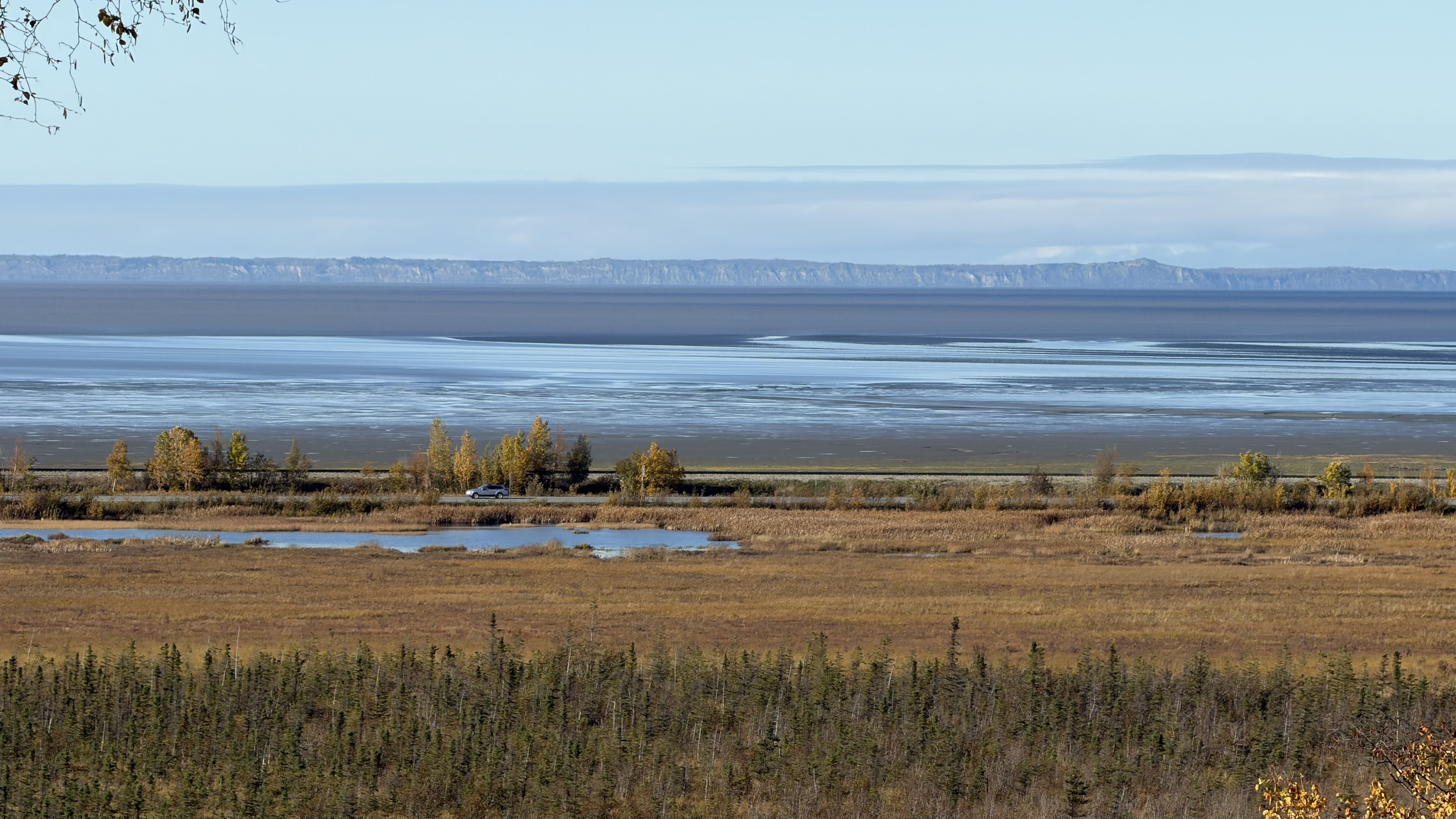
Potter Marsh facing the inlet

Potter Marsh is a wetland and wildlife viewing area, located south of Anchorage, Alaska, US, at the southern end of the Anchorage Coastal Wildlife Refuge. Situated in between the Seward Highway and the base of the Chugach Mountains, the marsh covers an approximate 564 acres and extends nearly two miles in length. It is considered one of the most accessible bird-watching and nature sites near the city, lying approximately fifteen minutes by road from downtown Anchorage.

== History ==
The marsh was shaped in 1917 after construction of the Alaska Railroad embankment, which altered local drainage and created conditions for a wetland environment. Today, Potter Marsh forms the most developed section of the Anchorage Coastal Wildlife Refuge, which stretches for about sixteen miles along the Anchorage shoreline.

== Boardwalk ==
A 1,550-foot (0.5 mi) wooden boardwalk allows visitors to walk through the habitat and observe wildlife without disturbing the biome. The trail surface is a mix of wood and gravel, generally wide enough for accessibility, and features benches, binoculars, interpretive signage, and van-accessible parking spaces. Dogs are not permitted on the boardwalk, and fishing or feeding wildlife within the marsh is prohibited in order to protect the area's ecological integrity.

== Birds ==
Potter Marsh is noted for its avian diversity. More than 130 species of migratory and nesting birds have been recorded, making it a popular destination for birders. Between late April and September, Canada geese, northern pintails, canvasback ducks, red-necked phalaropes, horned and red-necked grebes, and northern harriers are commonly observed. During migration seasons, gulls, Arctic terns, yellowlegs, and occasionally trumpeter swans can also be seen and heard. Bald eagles are known to nest in cottonwood trees near the bluffs, while waterfowl nest in sedges and grasses across the marsh.

== Other wildlife ==
Moose are commonly seen throughout the year, especially in late spring and early summer, and muskrats are often observed swimming through the open water channels. Rabbit Creek flows through the marsh and passes under the boardwalk, providing spawning habitat for salmon—particularly Chinook, coho, and pink—between May and August, depending on species. The presence of salmon further sustains the food web, drawing both birds and mammals.

== Scenic value ==
Visitors to the site are afforded expansive views of Turnagain Arm and the Chugach Mountains, making Potter Marsh a scenic as well as an ecological attraction. Its combination of accessibility, wildlife, and interpretive facilities has made it one of the best-known natural areas near Anchorage and a key feature of the Anchorage Coastal Wildlife Refuge.
