= Kanuti National Wildlife Refuge =

National wildlife refuge in central Alaska, United States

- IUCN category IV (habitat/species management area)
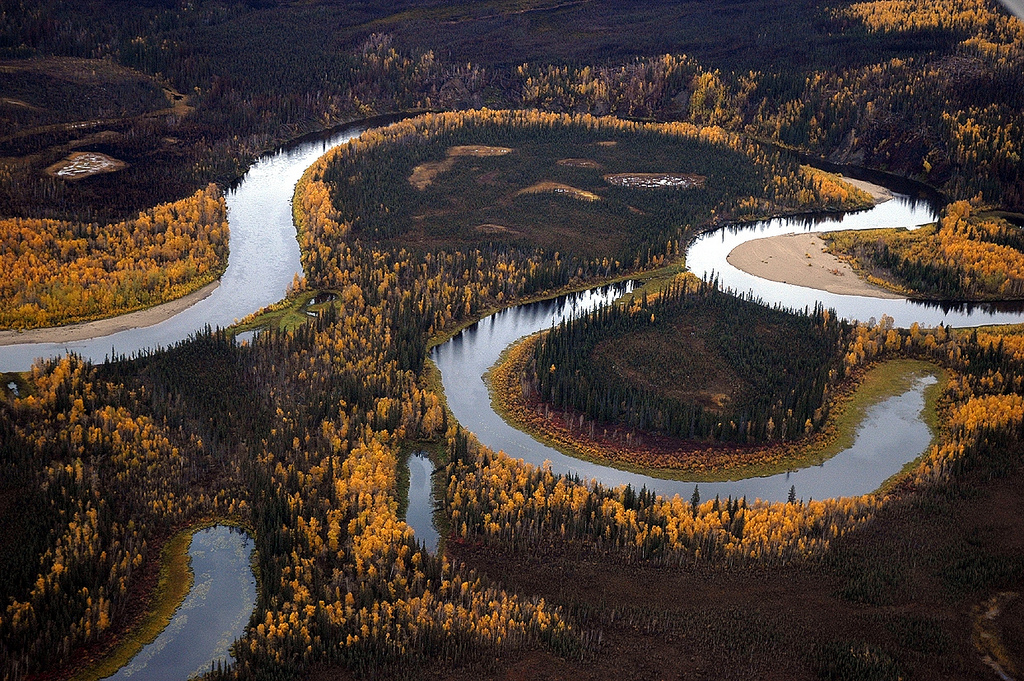
- Kanuti River in the refuge

- Location within Alaska
- Location: Alaska, United States
- Nearest city: Allakaket, Alaska
- Coordinates: 66.416667°N 151.833333°W
- Area: 1,640,000 acres (6,600 km^{2})
- Established: 1980
- Governing body: U.S. Fish and Wildlife Service
- Website: kanuti.fws.gov

Kanuti National Wildlife Refuge is a national wildlife refuge in central Alaska, United States. One of 16 refuges in Alaska, it was established in 1980 when Congress passed The Alaska National Interest Lands Conservation Act (ANILCA). At 1,640,000 acres (6,600 km^{2}), Kanuti Refuge is about the size of the state of Delaware. Located at the Arctic Circle, the refuge is a prime example of Alaska's boreal ecosystem. It is dominated by black and white spruce, with some white birch and poplars.

== Description and species ==
The region's short, hot summers are marked by numerous thunderstorms and lightning strikes, leading to a continuous cycle of burn and recovery. Natural wildfires create diverse habitats with the different plant species supporting a variety of wildlife. The refuge's boreal forest is home to 37 species of mammals, including two species of fox, Canadian lynx, brown and black bear species, wolf packs, moose, mink, coyote, muskrat, beaver, marten, river otter, muskoxen, and wolverine. Caribou from the Western Arctic and Ray Mountain herds occasionally winter on Kanuti, as well.

The refuge's migratory fish, chinook, chum and coho salmon, as well as sheefish, are creatures of extremes. Its sheefish make the longest spawning journey of any of their species, while Kanuti's salmon have to swim more than 1,000 miles (1,600 km) up the Yukon River before entering the Koyukuk River system to spawn. Refuge waters support twelve other fish species, including arctic grayling and northern pike.

Protecting breeding habitat for migratory birds is central to the mission of Kanuti National Wildlife Refuge and the U.S. Fish and Wildlife Service. Nearly 130 species of birds spend part or all of the year on refuge lands. With the loss of wetlands in regions outside Alaska, the importance of Kanuti as a nesting area for birds is likely to increase.

Certain lands within the Kanuti Refuge boundary are now under Native Alaskan ownership. Subsistence hunting is permitted within the refuge. Permafrost inhibits drainage of the surface water, leaving a soggy landscape that can make hiking difficult, if not impossible, in certain parts of the refuge. No designated trails, campsites, or public use cabins exist within refuge boundaries.

== See also ==
- List of largest National Wildlife Refuges
