= Alaska Department of Fish and Game =

Government agency in Alaska, United States

Agency overview
- Formed: 1959
- Preceding agencies: Alaska Territorial Department of Fish and Game; Fish and Game Commission; Fisheries Experimental Commission
- Headquarters: 1255 W 8th St, Juneau, Alaska
- Employees: 1,700
- Annual budget: $200 million
- Agency executive: Douglas Vincent-Lang, Commissioner
- Website: https://adfg.alaska.gov

The Alaska Department of Fish and Game (ADF&G) is a department within the government of Alaska. ADF&G's mission is to protect, maintain, and improve the fish, game, and aquatic plant resources of the state, and manage their use and development in the best interest of the economy and the well-being of the people of the state, consistent with the sustained yield principle. ADF&G manages approximately 750 active fisheries, 26 game management units, and 32 special areas. From resource policy to public education, the department considers public involvement essential to its mission and goals. The department is committed to working with tribes in Alaska and with a diverse group of State and Federal agencies. The department works cooperatively with various universities and nongovernmental organizations in formal and informal partnership arrangements, and assists local research or baseline environmental monitoring through citizen science programs.

== History ==
In 1949, the Territorial Legislature created the Alaska Territorial Fishery Service in an attempt to influence federal management practices that had decimated salmon populations in Alaska. The Territorial Fishery Service had no authority, but commented on federal regulations, conducted research, and tried to influence federal managers.

In 1955, delegates to the Alaska Constitutional Convention gathered in Fairbanks to draft the Alaska State Constitution. Vincent Ostrom, at the time a University of Oregon assistant professor of political science, assisted delegates in drafting a Natural Resources article. "Although several state constitutions touch on the subject of natural resource use, the Constitution of the State of Alaska contains one of the most comprehensive approaches to public and private resource use of any founding document... Two main principles ultimately guided the framers' design: beneficial use and sustainability. Ostrom offered the delegates several other concepts...including: common use, concurrent use, prior appropriation doctrine, and a vital idea for communities existing in an arid ecosystem, 'private ways of necessity.'". Key provisions of the constitution's Natural Resources article include:

- §3. Common Use — Wherever occurring in their natural state, fish, wildlife, and waters are reserved to the people for common use.
- §4. Sustained Yield — Fish, forests, wildlife, grasslands, and all other replenishable resources belong to the State shall be utilized, developed, and maintained on the sustained yield principle, subject to preferences among beneficial uses.
- §15. No Exclusive Right of Fishery [as amended in 1972 to allow limited entry] — No exclusive right or special privilege of fishery shall be created or authorized in the natural waters of the State. This section does not restrict the power of the State to limit entry into any fishery for purposes of resource conservation, to prevent economic distress among fishermen and those dependent upon them for a livelihood and to promote the efficient development of aquaculture in the state.

In 1957, in anticipation of statehood, the Territorial legislature expanded the Alaska Fishery Service and renamed it the Alaska Department of Fish and Game. C.L. "Andy" Anderson had been director of the Territorial Fishery Service since 1949 and continued as director for the new organization. Andy hired Jim Brooks to organize the Game Division, Walter Kirkness to organize the Division of Commercial Fisheries and Ed Marvich to develop a Sport Fish Division. These four men began to hire staff in 1958 and decide how the department would be organized.

On January 3, 1959, Alaska became a state. In 1959, the first state legislature established the Department of Fish and Game. However, full authority could not be granted until January 1, 1960, when the regulations and statutes were in place. Governor William Egan named C.L. "Andy" Anderson as the first Commissioner of the Alaska Department of Fish and Game. Alaska Statute 16.05.020 stated the commissioner shall: (1) supervise and control the department and may employ division heads, enforcement agents, and the technical, clerical and other assistants necessary for the general administration of the department; (2) manage, protect, maintain, improve, and extend the fish, game and aquatic plant resources of the state in the interests of the economy and general well-being of the state; and (3) have necessary power to accomplish the foregoing including, but not limited to, the power to delegate authority to subordinate officers and employees of the department.

== Regulatory process ==
The fish and wildlife regulatory process in Alaska is unusually transparent. Regulatory responsibilities rest primarily with Alaska's citizens rather than the Department of Fish and Game. Except for aquatic farming, the ADF&G commissioner does not have the authority to regulate fish and wildlife. Instead, the department administers regulations adopted by the Alaska Boards of Fisheries and Game, as well as statutes adopted by the Alaska Legislature. Although the commissioner does have the authority to appoint peace officers for the purpose of enforcing fish and game regulations, enforcement responsibilities rest primarily with the Division of Alaska Wildlife Troopers in the Alaska Department of Public Safety. Given many competing uses of fish and wildlife in Alaska and the public regulatory process, fish and wildlife management decisions are often controversial.

Most uses of fish and wildlife in Alaska are regulated by two citizen boards, the Alaska Board of Fisheries and the Alaska Board of Game. Each board has seven members appointed by the governor and confirmed by a joint session of the state legislature. The boards establish seasons, bag limits, methods and means, and other regulations on taking and uses of fish and wildlife. The boards also allocate resources among various beneficial uses: commercial, recreational, subsistence, and personal use, either directly through “amount necessary for subsistence” determinations or indirectly through season, bag limit, or methods and means regulations. The Boards meet on a regular schedule to consider proposals to change administrative regulations governing hunting and fishing. These public meetings include reports from Department of Fish and Game staff, testimony from the public, and open deliberation by the members of the board leading to votes on whether or not to adopt regulatory proposals.

The Department of Fish and Game submits proposals to the boards to change regulations, as do citizen advisory committees (below) and members of the public. Different groups of users attempt to influence resource management by submitting proposals, writing comments, and offering public testimony to the boards. The boards typically review and act on hundreds of regulatory proposals annually.

The boards are advised by 84 local citizen advisory committees across the state. Advisory committees submit proposals for regulatory changes, provide written and oral comments on regulatory proposals, and work with the boards during scheduled board meetings. Advisory committees meetings are always open to the public and are generally attended by department staff, representatives of other agencies, and members of the public. Advisory committees are intended to provide a local forum on fish and wildlife issues, and to provide policy recommendations to the boards. Citizens wishing to participate in the regulatory process can contact the Boards Support Section of the Alaska Department of Fish and Game.

A number of important species and uses of fish and wildlife in Alaska are not managed by the Alaska Department of Fish and Game. These include marine mammals (see MMPA), fish in federally managed waters (see NPFMC), and subsistence uses of fish and wildlife on federal public lands (see Federal Subsistence Board).

== Organizational structure ==
The Alaska Department of Fish and Game includes four divisions, three sections, and two associated entities. These include:

- Office of the Commissioner: Establishes policy and coordinates agency strategy for protection, management, conservation, and restoration of Alaska's fish and wildlife. Provides executive level oversight of department activities and services. Serves as liaisons with the governor's office, legislature, congressional offices, other government agencies, Alaska Native tribes and organizations, and Alaska's fish and wildlife resource stakeholder groups.
- Division of Administrative Services: Provides administrative support to the full range of programs and projects conducted by the Department of Fish and Game. Administers fish and game licensing program.
- Division of Commercial Fisheries: Manages commercial, subsistence, and personal use fisheries within the jurisdiction of the State of Alaska, as well as some commercial fisheries occurring in the Exclusive Economic Zone authority delegated by the North Pacific Fisheries Management Council: Permits and oversees the state's non-profit salmon hatchery and the aquatic shellfish farming programs. Operates three scientific laboratories: a fish genetics laboratory, a fish pathology laboratory, and a laboratory for reading coded wire tags, otoliths, and determining the age of fish. The largest division within the Alaska Department of Fish and Game.
- Division of Sport Fish: Manages recreational uses and some personal use fisheries of wild fish stocks (including shellfish) within State of Alaska waters. Diversifies and enhances recreational fishing opportunities via supplemental stocking of hatchery-reared fish. Operates two fish hatcheries located in Anchorage and Fairbanks. Oversees the state's Fish Resource Permit program.
- Division of Wildlife Conservation: Manages harvests of wildlife in Alaska, except marine mammals and wildlife taken for subsistence on federal public lands. Maintains and enhances opportunities to hunt, trap, and view wildlife. Provides opportunities for Alaskans to gain knowledge of and appreciation for Alaska's wildlife. Supports research on species with conservation concerns. Recommends actions to prevent species from becoming listed as Federally Threatened or Endangered. Administers certification courses required to hunt in many parts of Alaska and other jurisdictions throughout North America (e.g. hunter education, bowhunter education, muzzleloader education).
- Subsistence Section: Gathers information on all aspects of the role of subsistence hunting and fishing in the lives of the residents of the state. Quantifies amount, nutritional value, and extent of dependence on food acquired through subsistence hunting and fishing. Assists the boards in determining customary and traditional uses of fish and game. Evaluates impact of state and federal laws and regulations on subsistence hunting and fishing. Makes recommendations to the boards regarding the adoption, amendment, and repeal of regulations affecting subsistence hunting.
- Habitat Section: Protects Alaska's valuable fish and wildlife resources and their habitats. Reviews applications and issues permits for activities in fish-bearing waters and legislatively designated Special areas. Provides expertise to protect important fish and wildlife habitat. Monitors authorized projects and conducts compliance actions. Manages Alaska's Special Areas in accordance with legislative guidelines; prepares and updates management plans for these areas. Reviews proposed timber harvest activities; conduct field inspections; works cooperatively with timber operators and other governmental agencies. Reviews development projects (e.g., oil and gas, hard rock mining, hydroelectric) authorized under other agencies’ authorities. Maintains the “Catalog of Waters Important for Spawning, Rearing, or Migration of Anadromous Fishes.”
- Boards Support Section: Facilitates the public process for the state's regulatory systems relating to fish and wildlife resources. Ensures the public is provided an opportunity to participate in that process. Provides the administrative, technical, and logistical support for the Boards of Fisheries and Game and local fish and game advisory committees.
- Exxon Valdez Oil Spill Trustee Council: Formed to oversee restoration of ecosystems injured by the Exxon Valdez Oil Spill in 1989, through the use of the $900 million civil settlement. Consists of three state and three federal trustees (or their designees). Advised by members of the public and by members of the scientific community.
- Commercial Fisheries Entry Commission: Controls entry into Alaska's commercial fisheries to promote conservation of Alaska's fishery resources and economic health of commercial fishing. Issues and transfers annual commercial fishing permits and vessel licenses. Reports on the economics and stability of commercial fisheries.

== See also ==
- Commercial fishing in Alaska
- Alaska salmon fishery
- List of state and territorial fish and wildlife management agencies in the United States
