= Fred Brinkman =

American architect

- Born: November 23, 1892; Spokane, Washington
- Died: October 8, 1961 (aged 68); Flathead County, Montana
- Occupation: Architect
- Buildings: Anderson Style Shop, Charles Boles House, Brice Apartments, City Water Department, Cornelius Hedges Elementary School, and Russell School
- Projects: Several buildings at Montana State University

Frederick Adolph Brinkman (November 23, 1892 – October 8, 1961) was an American architect based in Kalispell, Montana, and Brinkman and Lenon is a partnership in which he worked. More than a dozen of Brinkman's extant works in and around Kalispell have been listed on the National Register of Historic Places, including the Anderson Style Shop, Charles Boles House, Brice Apartments, City Water Department, Cornelius Hedges Elementary School, Russell School, Linderman School, the Montgomery Ward Store in Kalispell, and the O'Neil Print Shop.

== Early years ==
Brinkman was born in Spokane, Washington in November 1892. His father, Gustave A. Brinkman, emigrated from Germany in 1880 and worked as a carpenter. His mother, Amalia (Wagenknecht) Brinkman, emigrated from Germany in 1881. His family moved to Montana while Brinkman was still an infant. Brinkman's father developed a reputation as a master carpenter and cabinetmaker and was reported to have built the first house in Kalispell. At the time of the 1900 United States census, the family remained in Kalispell. Brinkman also had two younger brothers, Charles E. (born November 1894 in Montana) and Conrad W. (born June 1897 in Montana). The family continued to reside in Kalispell at the time of the 1910 United States census. Brinkman attended Flathead High School as part of the Class of 1912.

== Education and early career ==
Brinkman attended the University of Wisconsin from 1912 to 1913 and the University of Michigan from 1913 to 1916. He received a Bachelor of Science in Architecture degree from the University of Michigan College of Engineering in 1916. While attending Michigan, he was a member of Tau Sigma Delta and won the AIA Scholastic Medal. In 1916, he began working as an architectural draftsman for Louis Kamper, one of the leading architects of the time in Detroit, Michigan. In a June 1917 draft registration card, Brinkman wrote that he was living in Detroit and was employed as an architect by Kamper. During World War I, he worked on the Panama Canal as a civil service architect while serving as a lieutenant in the Army Engineers, which he left in 1919.

== Architectural career in Montana ==
After being discharged from the military, Brinkman returned to Montana. From 1920 to 1922, he was employed as a draftsman by McIver & Cohagen in Billings, Montana. At the time of the 1920 United States census, Brinkman was living in Billings and working in an architect's office. He was married to Aral Jean Linthacum in December 1920 at Billings. At the time of the 1930 United States census, Brinkman was living in Kalispell, Montana, with his wife, Aral, and their daughter, Rosalie Brinkman (born c. 1923). He was in practice by himself from 1922 to 1946, at which time he went into partnership with Percy H. Lenon. He was a member of the Kiwanis, Elks, and Freemasons.

Brinkman worked as an architect in Kalispell for nearly 40 years. In the book, "A Guide to Historic Kalispell," Kathryn L. McKay wrote that Brinkman "influenced the physical appearance of his hometown more than any other single person," creating buildings "in virtually all architectural style popular from the 1920s to the 1950s." More than a dozen of Brinkman's extant works in and around Kalispell, Montana have been listed on the National Register of Historic Places, including the Anderson Style Shop, Charles Boles House, Brice Apartments, City Water Department, Cornelius Hedges Elementary School, and Russell School.

Brinkman designed several buildings at Montana State University, including the Business Administration Building, the Student Union, the Men's Dormitory, and Field House. He was also a lecturer at Montana State. He also designed the Administration Building at North Montana College.

Brinkman died in Flathead County, Montana, in October 1961.

== Selected works ==
=== Kalispell ===
- Anderson Style Shop, 222 Main St., Kalispell, MT, built in 1941 with Art Nouveau features, NRHP-listed
- Charles Boles House, 40 Appleway Dr., Kalispell, MT, three buildings designed by Brinkman and built in 1932, NRHP-listed.
- Brice Apartments, 228 2nd Ave. East, Kalispell, MT, built in 1936, designed by architects B. Brice Gilliland and Fred Brinkman, NRHP-listed
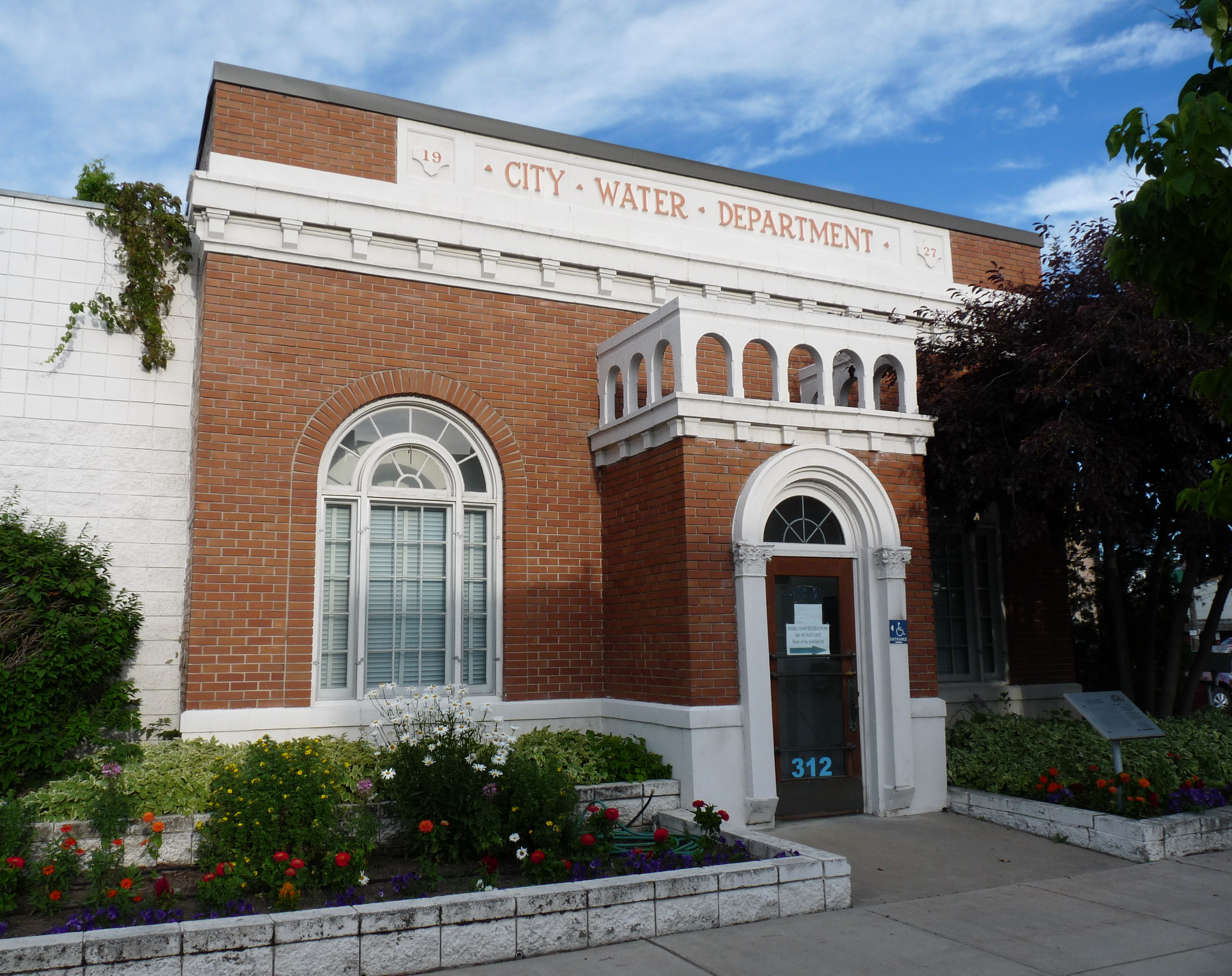
- Brinkman designed Kalispell's City Water Department building.
  City Water Department, 336 First Ave. E., Kalispell, MT, a Georgian Revival structure built in 1927, currently operated as a municipal courthouse, NRHP-listed
- Cornelius Hedges Elementary School, also known as Southside School, 827 4th Ave. East, Kalispell, MT, built in 1929, NRHP-listed
- Contributing works in the NRHP-listed Courthouse Historic District, Kalispell, MT, including the Buck / Robbin House (725 S. Main Street) and the First Presbyterian Church (524 Main Street).
- Several contributing works in the NRHP-listed East Side Historic District, Kalispell, MT, including the Dean Rental Property (919 5th Ave E.), Driscoll House (515 3rd St E.), and Linderman School (124 3rd Avenue East).
- Russell School, 227 W. Nevada St., Kalispell, MT, built in 1939, NRHP-listed
- Several contributing works in NRHP-listed West Side Historic District, Kalispell, MT, including Pearce House (132 8th St. West) and Elmer Sonstelie Residence (640 2nd Ave. W.).
- Kalispell General Hospital, four-story addition in 1948.
- Brinkman House, 700 First Avenue East, Kalispell, MT, a 1936 Tudor home designed by Brinkman as a showcase of his skills
- City Service Station, 401 1st Avenue East, Kalispell, MT, built in 1931, currently used by KCFW Television.
- Montgomery Ward Store, 333 Main Street, Kalispell, MT, built 1929, currently used by Alpine Lighting, part of the NRHP-listed Kalispell Main Street Historic District.
- O'Neil Print Shop, 323 Main Street, Kalispell, MT, built in 1926 in the Western Commercial style, currently used by Trippet's Printing, part of the NRHP-listed Kalispell Main Street Historic District.
- Ross Medical Clinic, 221 First Avenue East, Kalispell, MT, built in 1939, currently used by attorneys Johnson, Berg, McEvoy & Bostock.
- Halliday-Boysen Block, 110 Main Street, Kalispell, MT, built in 1928 in the Western Commercial Style, part of the NRHP-listed Kalispell Main Street Historic District.
- The new Flathead County High School, Kalispell, MT.
- Trinity Lutheran Church of Kalispell.
- Church of Christ Scientist, Kalispell, MT.

=== Outside Kalispell ===
- Symes Hotel, also known as the Symes Hot Springs Hotel, built in 1929 at Hot Springs, Montana, in the Mission style, NRHP-listed.
- Bigfork Inn, Bigfork, MT built in 1937 for Ernest J. O'Brien. The structure stands nearly unchanged as of Sep 2021.
- New Jeff Elementary, built in 1951 at Helena, Montana.
- Broadwater School, built in 1949 in Helena, Montana.
- Cobb House, a private residence for J.E. Lewis of the Glacier Hotel (Lake McDonald Lodge), was built in 1918. The Lake McDonald Lodge and outlying building complex, which includes the Cobb House, has been designated as a National Historic Landmark.
