= Camas Hot Springs =

Thermal springs in Montana

- Big Medicine Hot Springs; Lemoreaux Springs
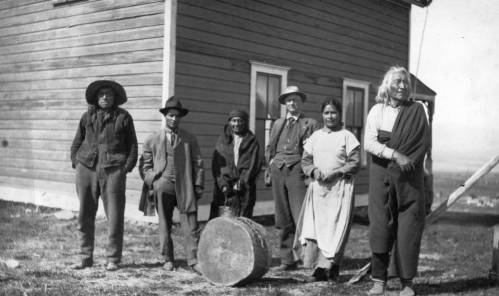
- Far right: Flathead elders Susie Magpie and Michael Wyateelame, pictured at Camas Prairie c. 1917; third from right, Harold Flower (Denver Public Library Special Collections X-31065)
- Interactive map of Camas Hot Springs
- Location: Flathead Indian Reservation, Little Bitterroot River Valley, Sanders County, Montana
- Coordinates: 47.607°N 114.663°W
- Elevation: 2,800 feet (850 m)
- Type: geothermal
- Temperature: 113 °F (45 °C)

Camas Hot Springs, also known as Big Medicine Hot Springs, is a group of historic hot springs in Hot Springs, Sanders County, Montana, United States.

== History ==
=== Indigenous peoples and early settlement ===
Long before Euro-American fur trappers and settlers arrived in the Little Bitterroot River Valley where Hot Springs, Montana is located, the Kootenai, Flathead, Pend d'Oreille and Kalispell Indigenous peoples inhabited this area. The Pend d'Orielles reportedly described the springs as "Big Medicine."

Pierre-Jean De Smet, a Jesuit missionary, visited and wrote about the springs in 1842. He recorded that the local Native people used the thermal springs "after the fatigues of a long journey, they find that bathing in this water greatly refreshes them." When Flathead Reservation was established, U.S. Congress set aside an 160-acre (65 ha) reserve around the hot springs as part of the organizing legislation.

The Great Falls Tribune reported that by 1905 the hot springs had primitive soaking pools, a hot spring water pool and mineral plunge built by townspeople, and hot mud baths, called a "corn hole" that allegedly cured rheumatism. Built by Ed Lemoreaux, the pool was used until 1911. One pool was later covered in gazebo and branded as the Fountain of Youth. A Christian missionary who visited Camas in 1911 found "rather few permanent settlers, but some 200 dwellers in hotels and tents seeking benefit from the hot baths."

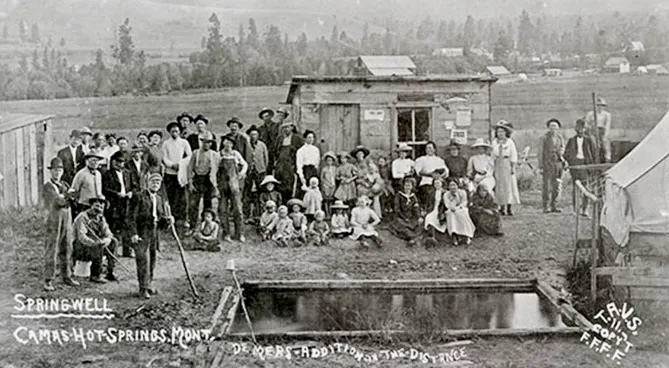
Resort development of Camas Hot Springs c. 1911

The first enclosed bathhouses were built in 1911. Camas Hot Springs was one of more than a dozen hot springs resorts operating in Montana in 1933.

=== Tribe-owned bathhouse ===
A new tribe-owned bath house was constructed and opened in 1949, with "China-blue bath tubs and fine ceramic tile". Native American Olympian Jim Thorpe was one of the 5,000 people who attended the grand opening, which included bison and elk barbecue sandwiches.

By 1986 the pipes were clogged with mineral deposits, heating the building was prohibitively expensive, and the building around the long-empty pool was considered derelict. The building was closed to the public in 1986. The tribe leased it to a group of locals operating as the Cam Redevelopment Commission in 1989. The tribe funded a public park with springs access in 1991. The tribe granted the redevelopment group access to 39,600 US gallons (150,000 L; 33,000 imp gal) of water per day from the bathhouse well. The plan collapsed by 1995, although the "cornhole" pool had been made wheelchair-accessible using funds raised, and the group gave up their lease. A local group named Friends of the Water helps keep the park clean and maintained, and pays insurance costs.

== Access ==
Outdoor soaking pools remain available to the public as of 2013. Leased from the tribe and operated by Leroy O'Bennick, the springs are now branded as Big Medicine Hot Springs. There is an admissions fee; cash payment on honor system. Tent and RV camping is available nearby, or visitors can rent rooms at Symes Hotel, a complex on the National Register of Historic Places, or Alameda's.

== Water profile ==
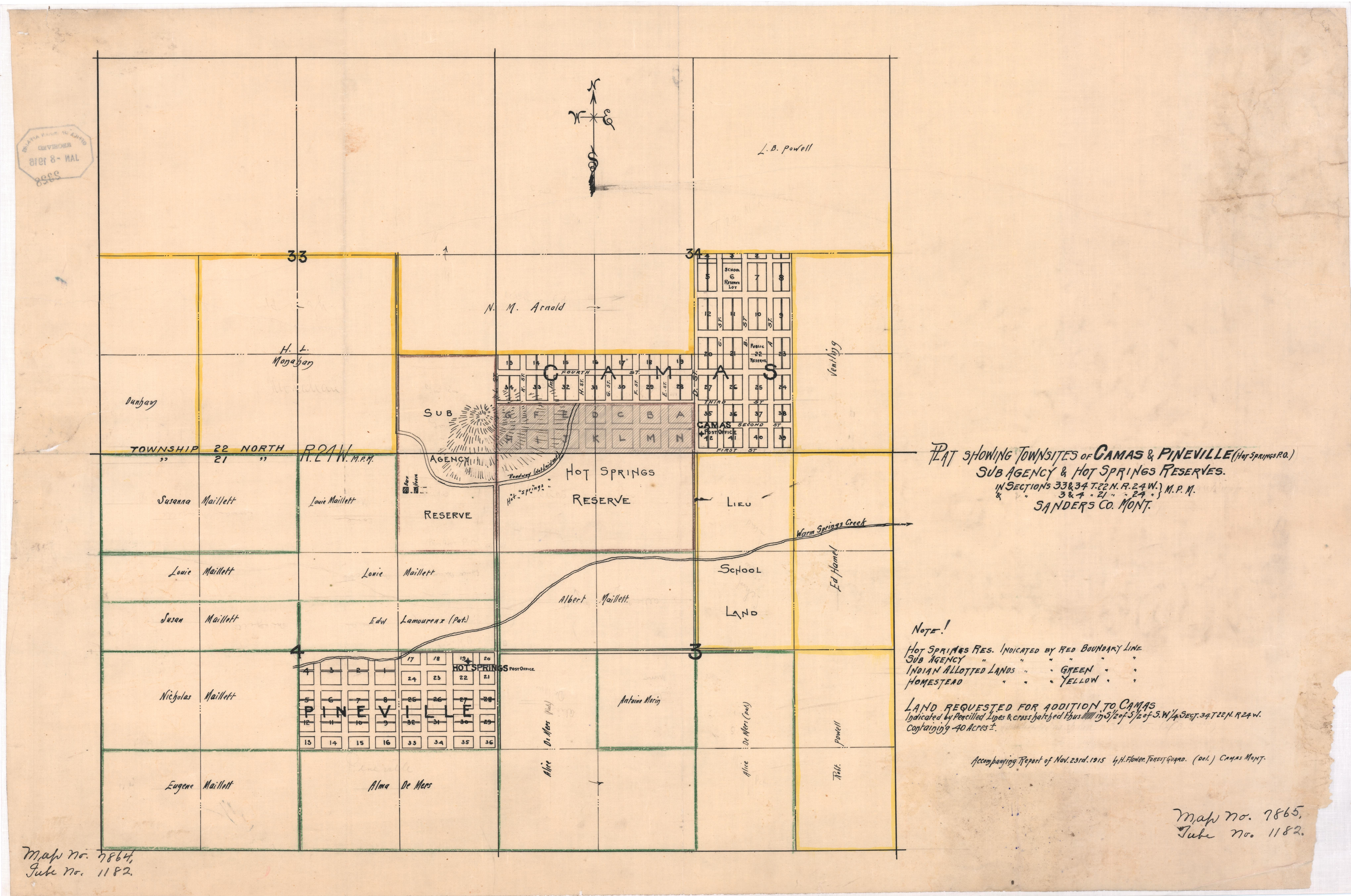
Plat map created c. 1916 showing location of springs and Hot Springs Reserve, Sanders County, Montana, created by Harold Flower for the U.S. government (NAID 232926092)

The springs are geologically associated with the Selkirk Mountains in Washington. According to NOAA, the water temperature where it emerges from the spring vent is 113 °F (45 °C). According to a USGS water-supply paper, "In the reentrant of the [Bitteroot River] valley drained by Hot Springs Creek...springs are especially numerous. Many of them yield cold water and are of the ordinary seepage type, but a number of springs in this locality yield hot water and are known as the Camas Hot Springs. The Camas Hot Springs are near the northwest corner of sec. 3, T. 21 N., R. 24 W., near the outcrop of a large diorite sill that has a steep dip. The high temperature and the mineral character of the water indicate that it comes from considerable depth. A bathhouse has been built, and the springs are visited each year by hundreds of people who suffer from various ailments."

The Camas mineral water is of a "carbonated alkaline silicious sulphureted water" type. Specific minerals include calcium (4–7.2 ppm), magnesium (4-4.3 ppm), sodium and postassium (79-93 ppm), carbonate radicle [CO_{3}] (55-56 ppm), bicarbonate radicle [HCO_{3}] (96-110 ppm), sulphate radicle [SO_{3}] (5.8-14 ppm), and chlorine (11-25 ppm).

== Gallery ==
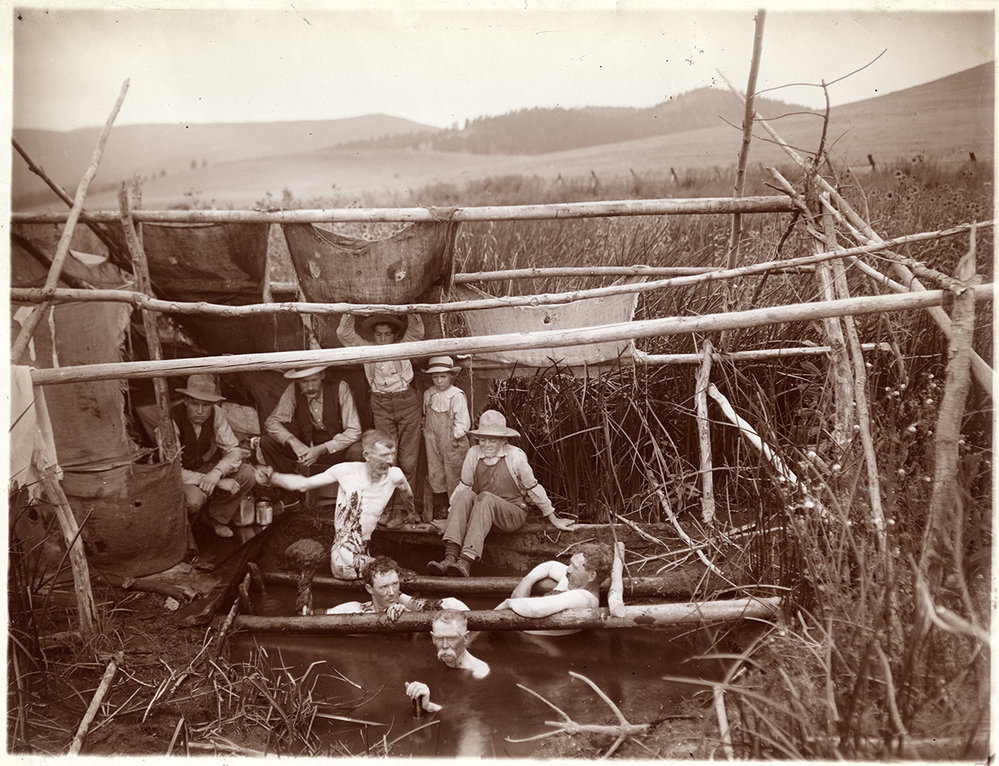
Mud baths at Hot Springs, Montana, c.1899

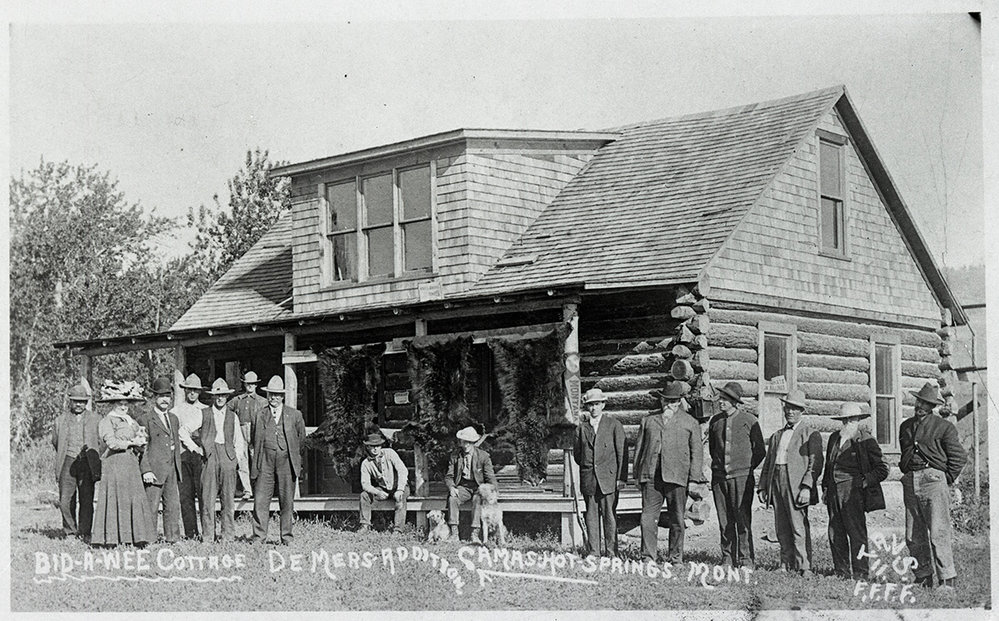
Bid-A-Wee Cottage, DeMers Addition, Camas Hot Springs, Montana, 1911

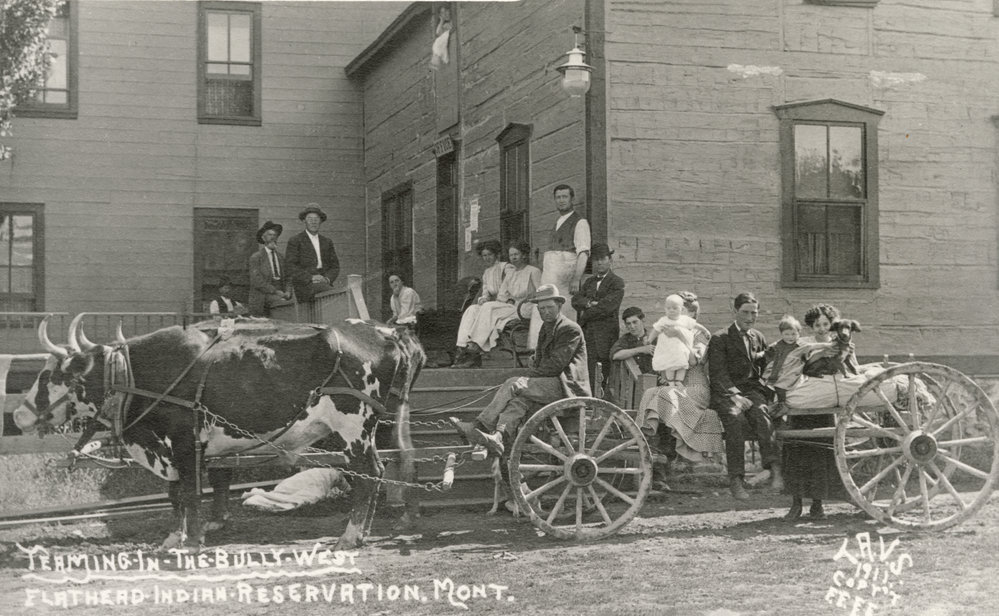
Teaming in The Bully West, at the DeMers, T.G. Hotel, Camas Hot Springs, 1911

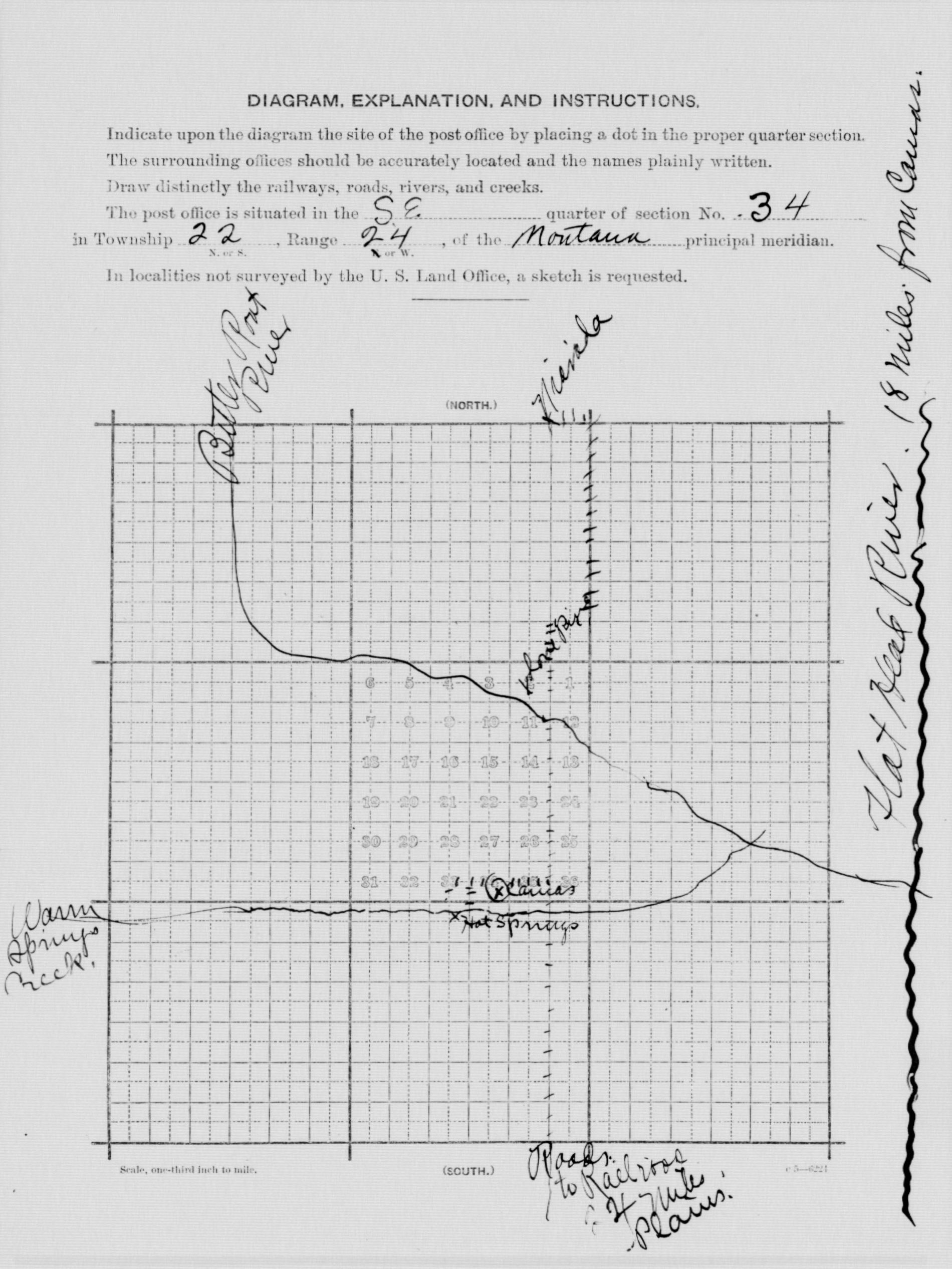
Camas post office location, showing relation to hot springs, 1917

== See also ==
- Symes Hotel – Historic resort, Hot Springs, Montana
- Wild Horse Hot Springs
- List of hot springs in the United States § Montana
- Camas prairie § Montana
