= List of Tau Sigma Delta chapters =

Tau Sigma Delta is an American scholastic honor society that recognizes the academic achievements of students in the field of architecture and allied arts. It was organized at the University of Michigan as an honorary fraternity in architecture and landscape design on June 5, 1913. In the following list of Tau Sigma Delta chapters, active chapters are indicated in bold and inactive chapters are in italics.

| Chapter | Charter date and range | Institution | Location | Status | Ref. |
|---|---|---|---|---|---|
| **Alpha** | June 5, 1913 – c. 1997; 20xx? | University of Michigan | Ann Arbor, Michigan | Inactive | |
| **Beta** | May 11, 1917 – 1934; 1941–xxxx ?; October 2012 | University of Minnesota | Minneapolis, Minnesota | Active | |
| Chi | May 25, 1918 – 1918 | University of Illinois Urbana-Champaign | Champaign, Illinois | Inactive | |
| Delta | May 5, 1918 – 1966 | Syracuse University | Syracuse, New York | Inactive | |
| Epsilon | June 6, 1918 – 1968 | University of Pennsylvania | Philadelphia, Pennsylvania | Inactive | |
| Gamma | June 2, 1919 – 1959 | Carnegie Institute of Technology | Pittsburgh, Pennsylvania | Inactive | |
| Zeta | May 3, 1920 – 1924 | University of Liverpool | Liverpool, England | Inactive | |
| Eta | May 13, 1920 – 1937 | University of California, Berkeley | Berkeley, California | Inactive | |
| Theta | June 8, 1922 – 1935 | Ohio State University | Columbus, Ohio | Inactive | |
| **Iota** | May 1924 | University of Washington | Seattle, Washington | Active | |
| **Kappa** | June 4, 1930 | Iowa State University | Ames, Iowa | Active | |
| **Mu** | May 29, 1931 – 1968; xxxx ? | University of Texas at Austin | Austin, Texas | Active | |
| **Lambda** | June 3, 1931 – 1985; xxxx ? | University of Southern California | Los Angeles, California | Active | |
| **Nu** | June 7, 1947 | Virginia Tech | Blacksburg, Virginia | Active | |
| **Eta Alpha (Gargoyle)** | December 10, 1949 | Tulane University | New Orleans, Louisiana | Active | |
| **Xi** | c. 1948 | University of Oklahoma | Norman, Oklahoma | Active | |
| **Pi** | January 29, 1951 – 19xx ?; 1983 | University of Kansas | Lawrence, Kansas | Active | |
| **Rho** | June 1, 1958 | Georgia Tech | Atlanta, Georgia | Active | |
| **Omicron** | April 27, 1959 | Kansas State University | Manhattan, Kansas | Active | |
| **Tau** | April 13, 1961 | Rice University | Houston, Texas | Active | |
| **Sigma** | May 10, 1961 | University of Notre Dame | Notre Dame, Indiana | Active | |
| **Upsilon** | April 12, 1962 | Texas Tech University | Lubbock, Texas | Active | |
| **Phi** | May 5, 1965 | Clemson University | Clemson, South Carolina | Active | |
| **Psi** | February 27, 1967 | University of Nebraska–Lincoln | Lincoln, Nebraska | Active | |
| **Alpha Epsilon** | March 3, 1967 | Kent State University | Kent, Ohio | Active | |
| **Omega** | June 22, 1967 | University of Florida | Gainesville, Florida | Active | |
| **Alpha Alpha** | May 4, 1970 | Texas A&M University | College Station, Texas | Active | |
| **Alpha Beta** | December 1, 1970 | Howard University | Washington, D.C. | Active | |
| **Alpha Gamma** | May 12, 1971 – 1978; xxxx ? | Oklahoma State University | Stillwater, Oklahoma | Active | |
| **Alpha Delta** | March 22, 1975 | North Dakota State University | Fargo, North Dakota | Active | |
| **Alpha Chi** | March 6, 1975 | University of Kentucky | Lexington, Kentucky | Active | |
| **Alpha Zeta** | April 17, 1977 | Louisiana State University | Baton Rouge, Louisiana | Active | |
| **Alpha Eta** | April 29, 1978 | University of Arkansas | Fayetteville, Arkansas | Active | |
| **Alpha Theta** | May 2, 1978 | Auburn University | Auburn, Alabama | Active | |
| **Alpha Lambda** | April 25, 1979 | Louisiana Tech University | Ruston, Louisiana | Active | |
| **Alpha Omega** | October 13, 1980 | Mississippi State University | Mississippi State, Mississippi | Active | |
| **Beta Alpha** | 1983 | University of Tennessee | Knoxville, Tennessee | Active | |
| **Beta Beta** | May 27, 1981 | California Polytechnic State University, San Luis Obispo | San Luis Obispo, California | Active | |
| **Beta Gamma** | 1981 | University of Miami | Coral Gables, Florida | Active | |
| **Beta Epsilon** | 1987 | University of Idaho | Moscow, Idaho | Active | |
| **Beta Theta** | 1987 | Montana State University | Bozeman, Montana | Active | |
| **Beta Iota** | 1987 | Miami University | Oxford, Ohio | Active | |
| Beta Kappa | 198x ? | University of North Carolina at Chapel Hill | Chapel Hill, North Carolina | Inactive | |
| **Beta Delta** | 1988 | University of Houston | Houston, Texas | Active | |
| **Beta Lambda** | 1988 | University of Colorado Denver | Denver, Colorado | Active | |
| **Beta Psi** | 1988 | California State Polytechnic University, Pomona | Pomona, California | Active | |
| **Beta Mu** | 1989 | Arizona State University | Tempe, Arizona | Active | |
| **Beta Sigma** | 1988 | University of Detroit Mercy | Detroit, Michigan | Active | |
| **Beta Tau** | 1990 | Roger Williams University | Bristol, Rhode Island | Active | |
| **Beta Upsilon** | June 1989 | Andrews University | Berrien Springs, Michigan | Active | |
| **Beta Phi** | 1990 | Catholic University of America | Washington, D.C. | Active | |
| **Beta Chi** | 1990 | Tuskegee University | Tuskegee, Alabama | Active | |
| Beta Omega | 1990 | Southern University | Baton Rouge, Louisiana | Active | |
| **Gamma Alpha** | 1990 | University of Louisiana at Lafayette | Lafayette, Louisiana | Active | |
| **Gamma Beta** | 1991 | Ball State University | Muncie, Indiana | Active | |
| **Gamma Delta** | 1991 | Lawrence Technological University | Southfield, Michigan | Active | |
| **Gamma Epsilon** | 1992 | Drury University | Springfield, Missouri | Active | |
| **Gamma Gamma** | 1993 | Florida A&M University | Tallahassee, Florida | Active | |
| **Gamma Zeta** | 1993 | New York Institute of Technology | Old Westbury, New York | Active | |
| **Gamma Eta** | 1993 | Savannah College of Art and Design | Atlanta and Savannah, Georgia | Active | |
| **Gamma Theta** | 1993 | North Carolina State University | Raleigh, North Carolina | Active | |
| **Gamma Iota** | 1994 | Prairie View A&M University | Prairie View, Texas | Active | |
| **Gamma Kappa** | 1994 | Washington State University | Pullman, Washington | Active | |
| **Gamma Lambda** | 1994 | University of New Mexico | Albuquerque, New Mexico | Active | |
| **Gamma Mu** | 2001 | University of Hawaiʻi at Mānoa | Mānoa, Honolulu, Hawaii | Active | |
| **Sigma Xi** | 2003 | Florida International University | Washington, D.C. | Active | |
| **Delta Lambda** | 2003 | University of South Florida | Tampa, Florida | Active | |
| **Tau Omega** | 2003 | University of Texas at San Antonio | San Antonio, Texas | Active | |
| **Iota Alpha** | 2006 | Hampton University | Hampton, Virginia | Active | |
| **Iota Chi** | 2008 | University of Massachusetts Amherst | Amherst, Massachusetts | Active | |
| **Gamma Nu** | March 2011 | University of Hartford | West Hartford, Connecticut | Active | |
| **Gamma Xi** | March 2011 | Judson University | Elgin, Illinois | Active | |
| **Delta Alpha** | March 2011 | Wentworth Institute of Technology | Boston, Massachusetts | Active | |
| **Iota Psi** | October 2011 | University of Maryland, College Park | College Park, Maryland | Active | |
| **Delta Beta** | September 2012 | Southern Illinois University-Carbondale | Carbondale, Illinois | Active | |
| **Epsilon Alpha** | September 2012 | University of Arizona | Tucson, Arizona | Active | |
| **Zeta Alpha** | October 2012 | American University of Sharjah | Sharjah, United Arab Emirates | Active | |
| **Eta Beta** | October 2012 | Morgan State University | Baltimore, Maryland | Active | |
| **Theta Alpha** | November 2012 | Florida Atlantic University | Boca Raton, Florida | Active | |
| **Iota Omega** | June 23, 2013 | South Dakota State University | Brookings, South Dakota | Active | |
| **Kappa Alpha** | June 26, 2013 | University of Memphis | Memphis, Tennessee | Active | |
| **Lambda Alpha** | September 12, 2013 | NewSchool of Architecture and Design | San Diego, California | Active | |
| **Mu Alpha** | September 18, 2013 | School of the Art Institute of Chicago | Chicago, Illinois | Active | |
| **Nu Alpha** | January 6, 2014 | University of Texas at Arlington | Arlington, Texas | Active | |
| **Xi Alpha** | March 11, 2014 | University of Nevada, Las Vegas | Paradise, Nevada | Active | |
| **Omicron Alpha** | July 1, 2014 | Northeastern University | Boston, Massachusetts | Active | |
| **Pi Alpha** | November 4, 2014 | Woodbury University | Burbank, California | Active | |
| **Rho Alpha** | April 13, 2015 | University of Manitoba | Winnipeg, Manitoba, Canada | Active | |
| **Sigma Alpha** | April 8, 2015 | University at Buffalo | Buffalo, New York | Active | |
| **Upsilon Alpha** | 2018 | Marywood University | Scranton, Pennsylvania | Active | |
| **Chi Alpha** | 2018 | Kennesaw State University | Cobb County, Georgia | Active | |
| **Psi Alpha** | 2019 | Temple University | Philadelphia, Pennsylvania | Active | |
| **Gamma Pi** | 2020 | University of the District of Columbia | Washington, D.C. | Active | |
| **Chi Rho** | 2021 | California Baptist University | Riverside, California | Active | |
| **Gamma Omicron** | 2022 | New Jersey Institute of Technology | Newark, New Jersey | Active | |
| | | Rochester Institute of Technology | Rochester, New York | Active | |
| | | Thomas Jefferson University | Philadelphia, Pennsylvania | Active | |
