= Walker Library =

Walker Library may refer to:

- David S. Walker Library in Tallahassee, Florida, USA
- James E. Walker Library at the Middle Tennessee State University in Murfreesboro, Tennessee, USA
- Vol Walker Library at the University of Arkansas in Fayetteville, Arkansas, USA
- Walker Library (Minneapolis) in Minneapolis, Minnesota, USA
- The Walker Library of the History of Human Imagination, a private library in Ridgefield, Connecticut, USA
- Walker Management Library at Vanderbilt University in Nashville, Tennessee, USA
- Walker Memorial Library in Westbrook, Maine, USA
