= Private library =

Library held by individual(s) or private organisations for members only

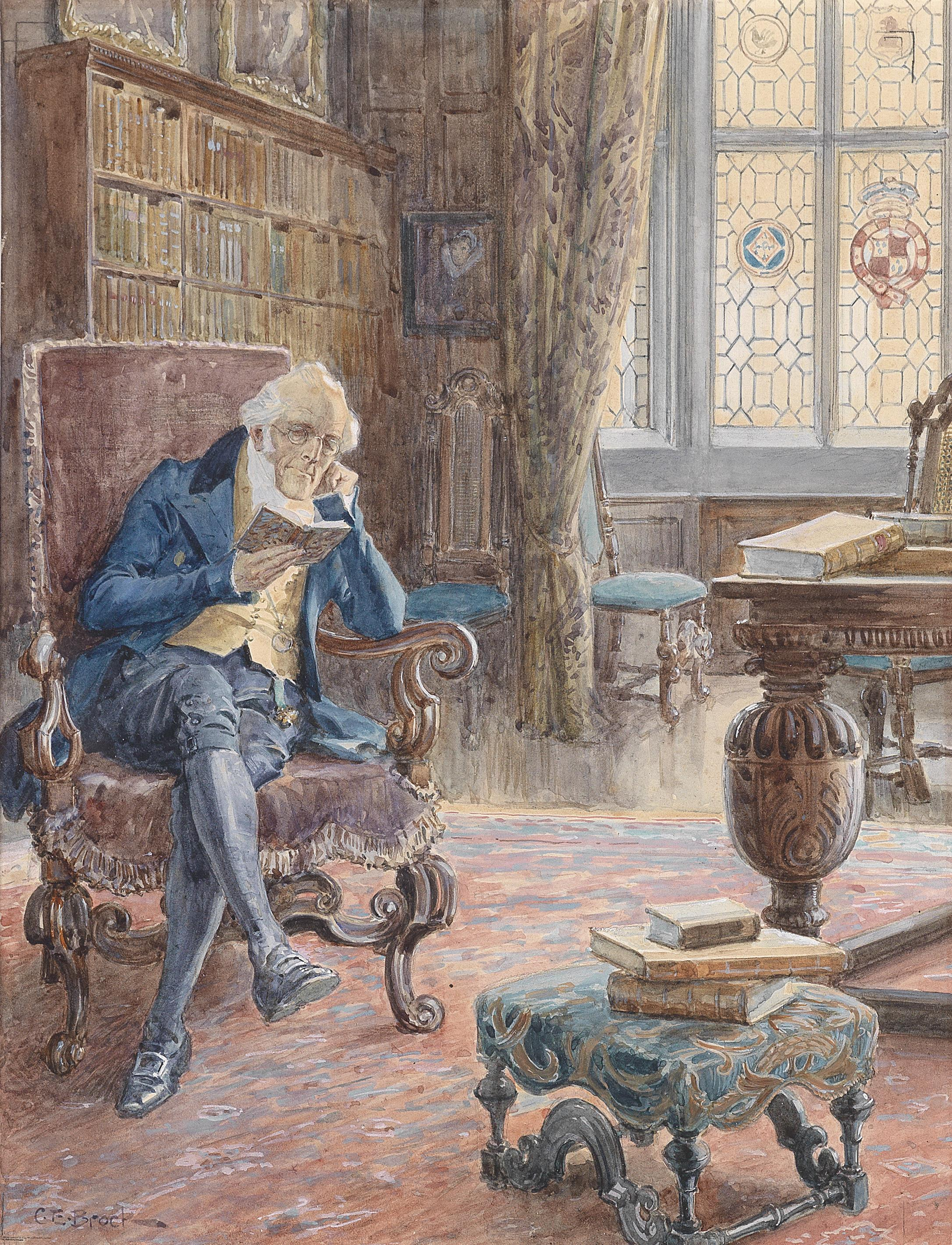
Charles Edward Brock's private library

Private libraries are libraries that are privately owned and are usually intended for the use of a small number of people, or even a single person. As with public libraries, some people use bookplates – stamps, stickers or embossing – to show ownership of the items. Some people sell their private libraries to established institutions such as the Library of Congress, or, as is often the case, bequeath them after death. Much less often, a private library is maintained intact long after the death of the owner.

== History ==
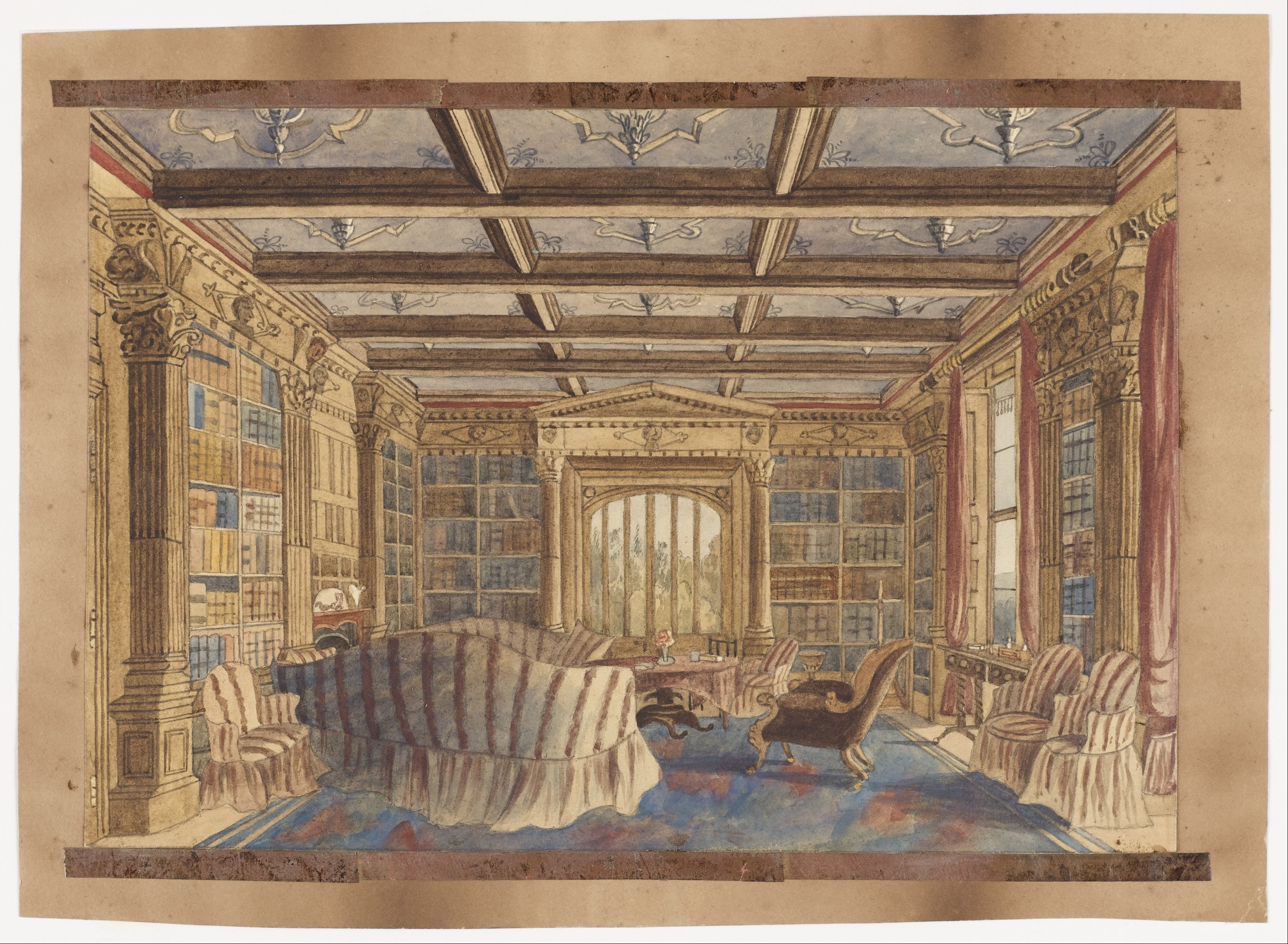
The Library at Dingestow by Charlotte Bosanquet

Private library of Russian archaeologist Ivan Zabelin

The earliest libraries belonged to temples or administration bodies, resembled modern archives, and were usually restricted to nobility, aristocracy, scholars, or theologians. Examples of the earliest known private libraries include one found in Ugarit (dated to around 1200 BC) and the Library of Ashurbanipal in Nineveh (near modern Mosul, Iraq), dating back to the 7th century BC.

=== Mesopotamia ===
Mesopotamia was home to a great number of private libraries, many with extensive collections of over 400 tablets. The nucleus of these private libraries were primarily texts which had been transcribed by the proprietors themselves from the time they acquired their education in the art of the scribe. As insignificant as these libraries may seem, they established the basis for the Library of Ashurbanipal collection.

=== Egypt ===
While private libraries in ancient Egypt were not common, they did exist to some extent. One of the problems in identifying potential individual libraries is that it is often difficult to distinguish between a personal library and one associated with a temple. However, many personal libraries survived over time, and are perhaps more numerous than traditionally assumed. Several private tombs have exposed copious texts whose content is scholarly in nature. In addition, extensive clusters of papyrus scrolls have been unearthed in association with domiciliary arrangements, confirming that some type of library endured there. The Middle Kingdom Period (2055–1650 BC) offers the best clues to the presence of private libraries in ancient Egypt.

For example, one sepulcher contained a chest with books on bureaucratic relations, hymns, and incantations. In total, the cache revealed a 20-volume library. A rather large collection from the Thirteenth Dynasty suggests a library belonging to a doctor or necromancer. In addition to general texts on assorted literature, there is a profusion of discourses on medicine and magic. A private library of considerable quantity is attributed to Kenherkhepshef, a scribe. This library embodies nearly 50 manuscripts, accommodating a collection of disparate subjects from correspondence missives to astrological recipes such as incantations and dream interpretations. This particular library spanned many generations, being passed to one family member to the next, which gives the impression of the significance the library had.

A manuscript known as the Westcar Papyrus from this same period alludes to an individual whose residence occupies spaces for a private library. The text of the manuscript is a fanciful narrative; however, it proves that ordinary citizens were literate and accumulated books for their own use. One Middle Kingdom tomb, associated with a healer and lector priest, contained over 20 books, one of which was the now-famous Tale of the Eloquent Peasant. Finally, a private library in a New Kingdom tomb at the site of Deir el Medina housed books on medicine as well as on love poetry and wisdom literature.

=== Ancient Greece ===
In 600 BC, library and archival collections in ancient Greece flourished. Within the next three centuries the culture of the written word rose to a pinnacle there. Although public libraries available to all citizens were established in some cities, such as Athens, most citizens could not read. However, private book collections owned by the elite and leading citizens were growing, along with the glorious homes and structures used to store them. Private libraries were not only built by the wealthy, but also by professionals who needed information nearby, including doctors and scholars. Notable scholarly figures like Euripides, Herodotus, Thucydides, and even Plato had their own private libraries with large collections. One of the most notable figures in ancient Greece with his own private library was Aristotle. Establishing his personal collection into a library at the Lyceum, Aristotle allowed his students and fellow scholars to use it. After his death, his collection grew to include the work of Theophrastus and student research. The collection was thought to have been scattered after Theophrastus's own death by Neleus. While most of the collection was supposedly brought to Rome and Constantinople, other pieces within the collection were sold to the Library of Alexandria, only to be destroyed later with the library.

=== Ancient China ===
There were numerous private libraries in Ancient China. These institutions were called "book collection house" in Chinese, which was widely accepted from Song Dynasty. Under the influence of petty-farmer consciousness, the patriarchal system, lack of books, and other factors, "hiding book" thinking was dominant then. Not all private libraries in ancient China were unavailable to the public. Some owners made their collection open to the public. Mostly to young men who were studying for civil service examinations, these became known as "academy" libraries.

=== Ancient Rome ===
The earliest libraries to appear in Rome were private and were most often procured as spoils of war. For example, when the Roman general Aemilius defeated the Macedonian king Perseus in 168 BC, the only plunder he wished to possess was the king's private library. Likewise, in 86 BC, the Roman general Sulla appropriated the library of the Greek bibliophile Apellicon of Teos, infamous for having stolen original documents from government archives. Finally, around 73 BC, Lucullus removed and brought back to Rome the private library of King Mithridates VI of the Pontus region. Nearly every house of nobility had a library, and virtually every one was split into two rooms: one for Latin texts and one for Greek texts. Rome may very well have been the birthplace of specialized libraries, with evidence of early medical and legal libraries. In Rome, one can see the beginnings of book preservation. One author proposed that a library is better suited if it meets the rising sun in the east in order to ensure that it does not succumb to bookworms and decomposition. Some examples of Roman-period private libraries include the Villa of the Papyri, the House of Menander, the House of Augustus, and the Domus Aurea.

In the 5th century BC, on the island of Cos outside the city of Pergamum, a medical school complex with a library was built in the sanctuary of Asclepius. This is the first medical school known to have existed, and consequently can be credited as the first specialized library.

Small private libraries called bibliothecae were responsible for advancing the larger public libraries of the Roman world. The design of these libraries was rather a novelty, and became the archetype of later institutions, in particular libraries of imperial estates. The form of private libraries during the late Republic Period and early Empire Period imitated Greek architectural characteristics. The library itself was a repository of diminutive proportions whose purpose was to accommodate books. The books were supported on wooden shelving units or were kept in cupboards situated against walls. Rooms annexed to the library were used primarily as reading rooms. The configuration of these libraries was rectangular and is considered more of niche than a separate room because they were always extensions of other structures.

Acquiring books for personal use in order to cultivate oneself was all the rage in the Roman world, partially galvanized by the monarchs who were often prolific writers. Satirist Martial notes that it was quite accepted for the houses of the Roman elite to harbor a library. One reason for the abundance of private libraries is the reinforcement of enlightenment and perpetuating the literary traditions. It was also not uncommon for an individual to assemble a library in order to inveigle an emperor. The writer Lucian of Samosata denounces one such individual who exploits his library to cajole the emperor.

The emperor Augustus admired the works of authors and was a prolific author himself. He encouraged the advancement of the library as an institution by harboring a private library of his own. The library was the first to incorporate Greek and Hellenic architectural behaviors. The shape of the library was in the recognizable rectangular style. This library marked the establishment of a binary collection with individual rooms supporting the literatures of Greek and Roman writers respectively.

Both the philologist Aulus Gellius and the emperor Marcus Aurelius acknowledge the existence of a private library housed in the Domus Tiberiana. While Aurelius makes a passing reference to a bibliothecarius or palace librarian, Gellius commented on how he and author Sulpicius Apollinaris were engaged in erudite disquisition within the library.

The Roman sovereign Hadrian had a fondness for all types of literature; his private sanctuary, the Villa Adriana, had its own library. Like the private library of Augustus, Hadrian's collection promoted a doublet of Greek and Latin writings. It is difficult to ascertain how many manuscripts the libraries held; however, one assessment speculates that at a single wooden cabinet may have held at least 1,500 scrolls.

During the tenure of Nero, an affluent residence was not complete without a library. In fact, libraries were as important as baths.

The third century biographer Capitolinus remarks on a private library owned by the Emperor Gordion II. Apparently, the original owner of this library was the father of scholar and polymath Quintus Serenus Sammonicus, whom Gordion was a student of. Upon the death of Sammonicus in 212 AD, the library of some 62,000 manuscripts was entrusted to Gordion. It is not clear what happened to this library, but it has been suggested that it was absorbed by the libraries of the Palatine, Pantheon, or Ulpian. It is also conceivable that it had been interspersed during the upheavals of the third century.

=== Renaissance Europe ===
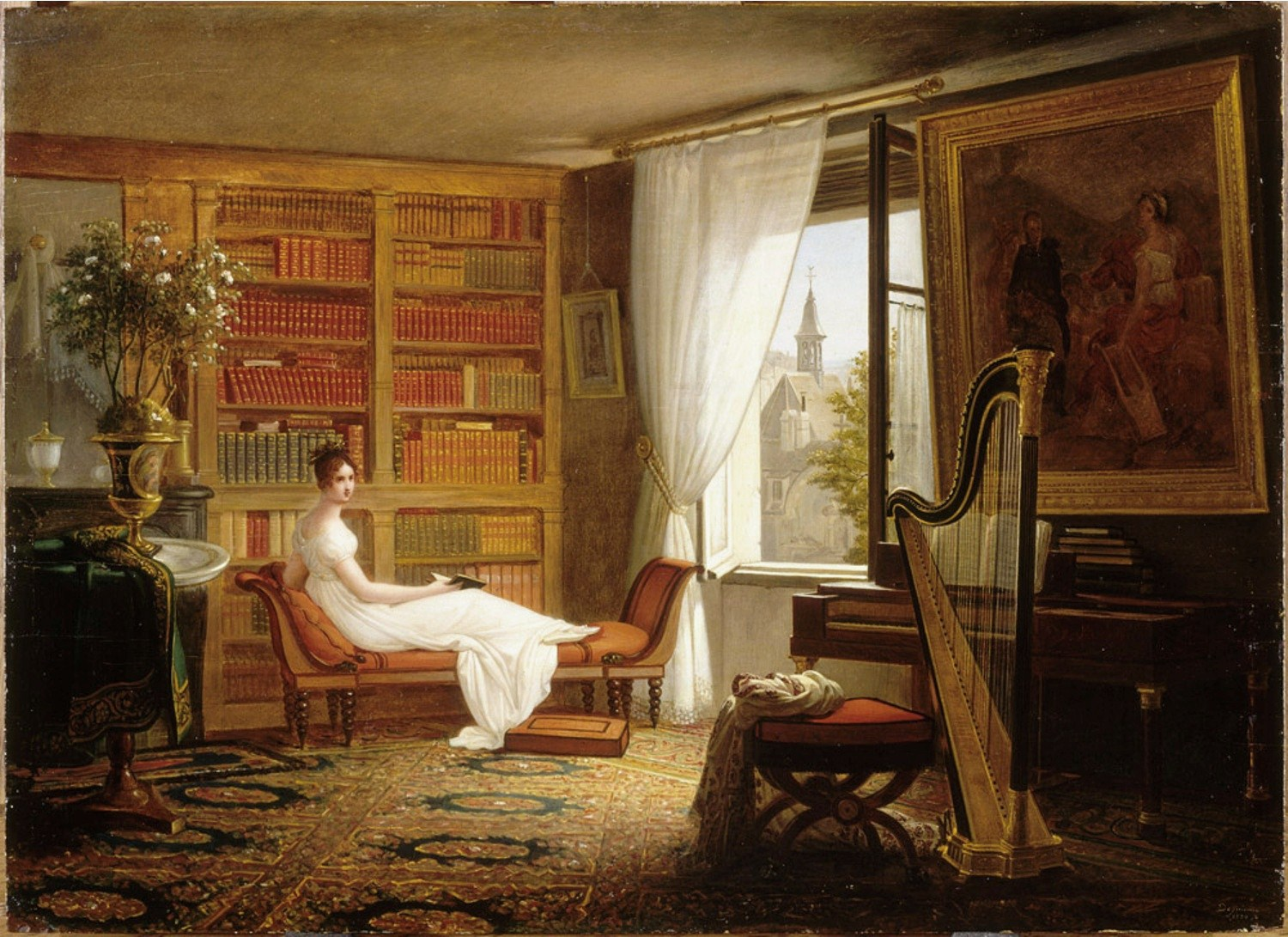
Mme Récamier in her library

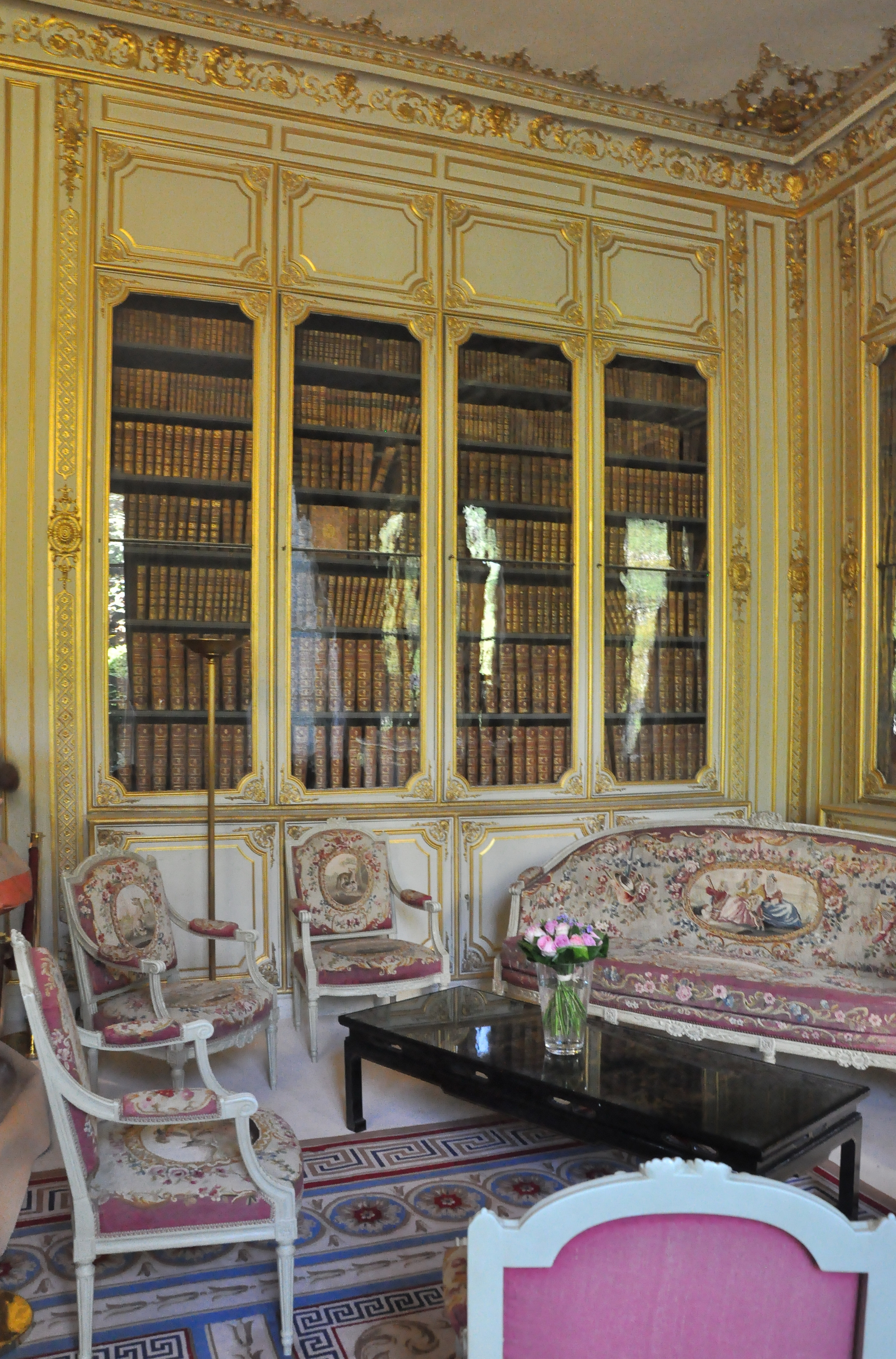
Bibliothèque Royale de l'Hôtel de Bourvallais

The Renaissance brought with it a renewed interest in conserving the new ideas being put forth by the great thinkers of the day. Kings throughout European countries created libraries, some of which have become the national libraries of today. In addition, wealthy individuals began establishing and developing their own private libraries.

The National Library of France (French: Bibliothèque Nationale de France) in Paris was started in 1367 as the Royal Library of King Charles V. In Florence, Italy, Cosimo de Medici had a private library which formed the basis of the Laurentian Library. The Vatican Library was also established in the 15th century. Pope Nicholas V helped to renew the Vatican Library by donating hundreds of personal manuscripts to the collection.

The creation and expansion of universities prompted the gifting of private libraries to university libraries. One notable donation was by Humphrey, Duke of Gloucester to Oxford University in the early 15th century.

=== Colonial North America ===
Private libraries were a characteristic of the first colonists to North America, rather than a peculiarity. For example, 27 libraries were known to have existed in Plymouth Colony alone between 1634 and 1683. Books and the idea of establishing libraries in the new world had always been a strong conviction for the early settlers. William Brewster was one of the many passengers on board the Mayflower on its maiden voyage to America who transported his library, which consisted of nearly 400 volumes. Even as early as 1607, these libraries were flourishing in English-settled Jamestown. The Virginia colony sovereign John Smith described a private library owned by the Reverend Good Master Hunt which was incinerated during a fire that destroyed much of the town. Another analogous finding from 1720 to 1770 in Maryland records that over half of the demographics population had at least the Bible in their libraries; in Virginia, there were close to a thousand private libraries, each with a typical assemblage of 20 books. Distinguished martial administrator Miles Standish owned 50 books, while the governor of Connecticut John Winthrop the Younger carried 1,000 books with him on his voyage to the recently established territories in 1631.

George Washington's proclivity towards reading and collecting books in general was also acclaimed. Washington's personal library was originally housed in his estate at Mount Vernon, Virginia. The library consisted of 1,200 volumes and a catalog of the titles included in his library was created before his death in 1799. During the mid-nineteenth century, nearly all of the former collection had been purchased by Massachusetts book and manuscript merchant Henry Stevens. Stevens subsequently decided to auction the collection to the British Museum in London; however, interested parties from both Boston and Cambridge, Massachusetts procured the collection where they bequeathed it to its current residence, the Boston Athenæum. Washington's library encompassed books in many disciplines such as economics, geography, history, and religion. Some of his most beloved volumes were those that pertained to agriculture, since he was an avid farmer. One work that he embraced dearly was a play entitled Cato, a Tragedy written in 1712 by the English playwright Joseph Addison because he felt a connection between the main character Cato and his constant battle with totalitarianism. In addition to the subject areas, the library accommodated diaries, travel, and over 100 federal correspondence letters.

Like Washington, Thomas Jefferson was a prolific collector of books and a voracious reader. He actually owned three libraries over the course of his lifetime. The first was maintained from ages 14 to 26 (1757–1770) at his birthplace of Shadwell, Virginia, about five miles west of Monticello. It consisted of 40 volumes that he inherited from his father. Since his father had been a surveyor, the library contained a plethora of maps and topographical monographs, though Jefferson added quite a few volumes to the library from his studies. By 1770, Jefferson had acquired about 400 volumes, worth an estimated 200 pounds. However, these were largely destroyed when his home in Shadwell burned in 1770.

Jefferson quickly rebuilt his library at his home in Monticello. By August 1773 he had 1,256 books, and by March 1783 he had 2,640. Over 2,000 books were purchased during the time he spent in France in the late 1780s. Because Jefferson was fluent in French and Latin, the library contained numerous books in these languages, as well as 15 others. The collection was abundant in books on law, philosophy, and history, but it accommodated volumes on many subject areas such as cooking, gardening, and more exotic avocations like beekeeping. Unlike some of his contemporaries, Jefferson traveled very little. As such, the library became his best travel guide. Even though the library went through multiple stages throughout his lifetime, in 1814 it was known that he had the single greatest private library in the United States.

Though Jefferson is recognized most for the breadth of his library, the most astounding characteristic of it is how it was cataloged. While most libraries during this period in American history classified their holdings alphabetically, he chose to catalog his collection by subject. Inspired by Francis Bacon's tripartite categorization of knowledge (Memory, Reason, and Imagination), Jefferson divided his library's catalog into History, Philosophy, and Fine Arts before further subdividing topics out into a total of 46 categories.

When the Library of Congress was consumed by fire, Jefferson persuaded the library to purchase his collection of between nine and ten thousand books in order to compensate for the lost collection. Congress accepted a portion of Jefferson's library (6,487 volumes) in 1815 for the cost of $23,950 (equivalent to $421,302 in 2025). The figure was obtained by calculating the number of books in addition to their dimensions, though Jefferson insisted that he would agree to any price. He remarked, "I do not know that it contains any branch of science which Congress would wish to exclude from this collection". Jefferson assembled a succeeding library of several thousand volumes. This second library was placed in an auction and purchased in 1829 in order to alleviate his indebtedness. December 1851 brought a second fire to the Library of Congress, which managed to extinguish over 60% of the collection acquired from Jefferson.

The most recognizable individuals in colonial North America were proprietors of substantial personal libraries. John Adams, for example, owned more than 3000 volumes, which were entrusted to the Boston Public Library in 1893. He was not only a bibliophile, but an amateur librarian; he maintained his collection fastidiously and even opened his library to the public.

Legislator James Logan was a contemporary of Benjamin Franklin, with whom he developed a relationship over a passion for books. According to Logan, there was nothing more important than the acquisition of knowledge. His appetite for enlightenment led to the establishment of a private library of nearly 3000 titles, acknowledged as one of the largest in colonial America. In 1745, Logan converted his private library into a public library, which was the first structure in America to be recognized as a library for the public.

Benjamin Franklin, who was instrumental in establishing the first subscription library in North America, was the owner of a private library of considerable proportions. This clandestine miscellanea is not well known, though a contemporary of Franklin, a certain Manasseh Cutler, observed this library firsthand. Cutler noted, "It is a very large chamber and high studded. The walls were covered with book shelves filled with books; besides there are four large alcoves, extending two-thirds of the length of the chamber, filled in the same manner. I presume this is the largest and by far the best, private library in America". There are no extant catalogs of what treasures were held in Franklin's library; however, his will contained a register which included some 4,726 titles.

=== Modern era ===
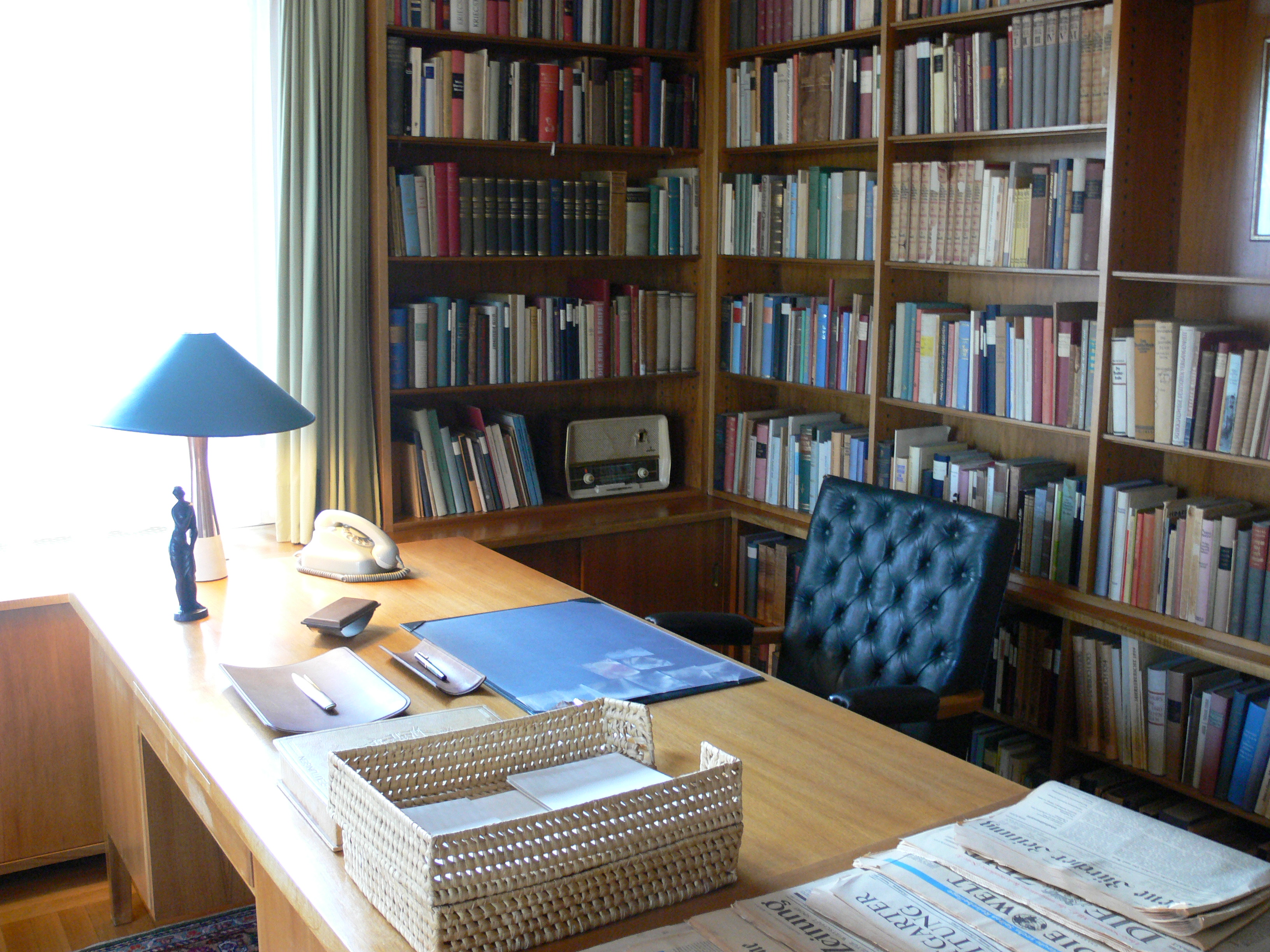
Theodor Heuss's private library in Stuttgart

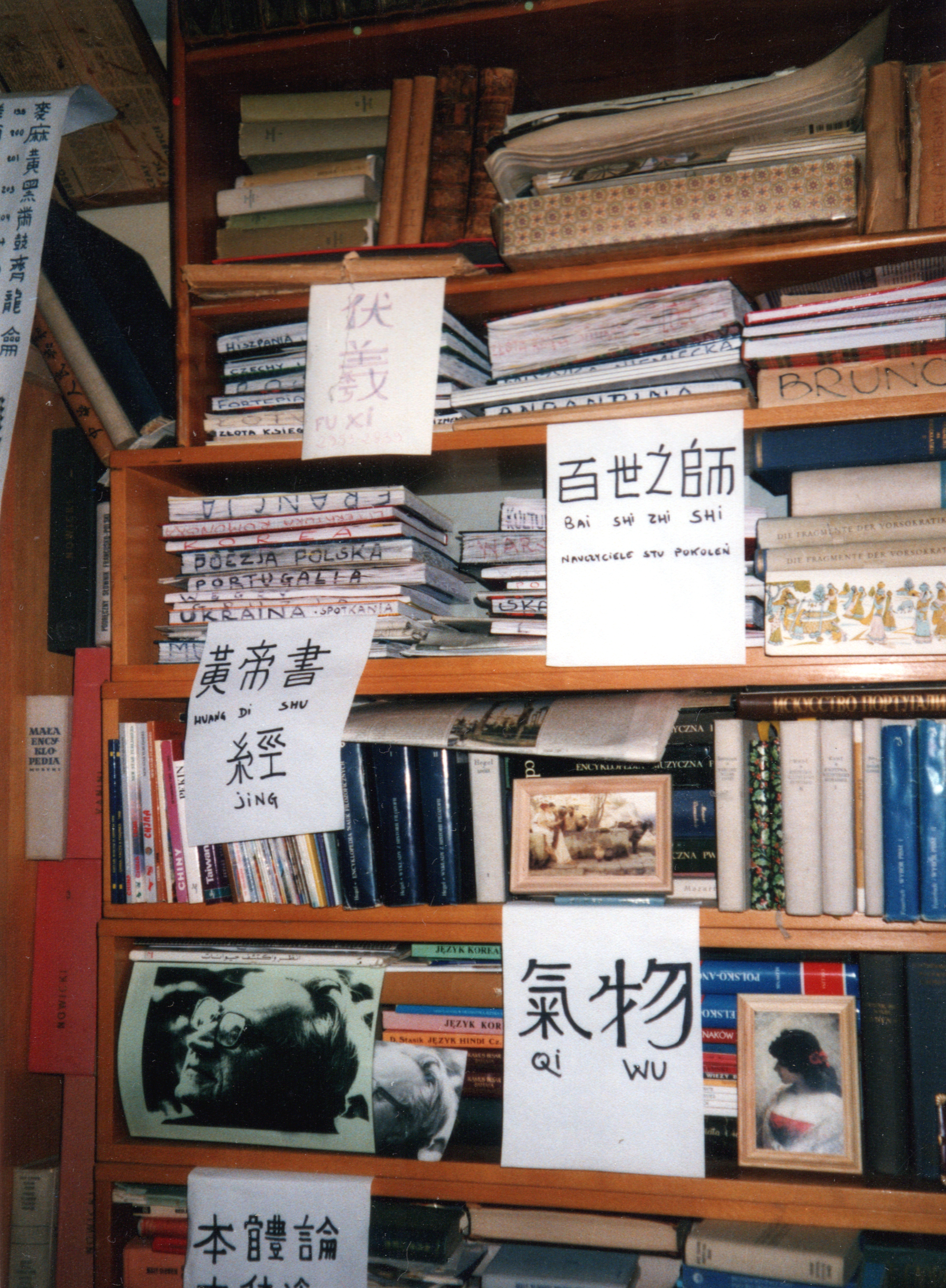
Part of the private library of Andrzej Nowicki in Warsaw with sections named in Chinese – fot. Ivonna Nowicka

Private libraries in the hands of individuals have become more numerous with the introduction of paperback books. Some nonprofit organizations maintain special libraries, which are often made available to librarians and researchers. Law firms and hospitals often maintain either a law or medical library for staff use. Additionally, corporations maintain libraries that specialize in collections pertaining to research specific to the areas of concern to that organization. Scientific establishments within academia and industry have libraries to support scientists and researchers. These libraries may not be open to the public.

== Library (domestic room) ==
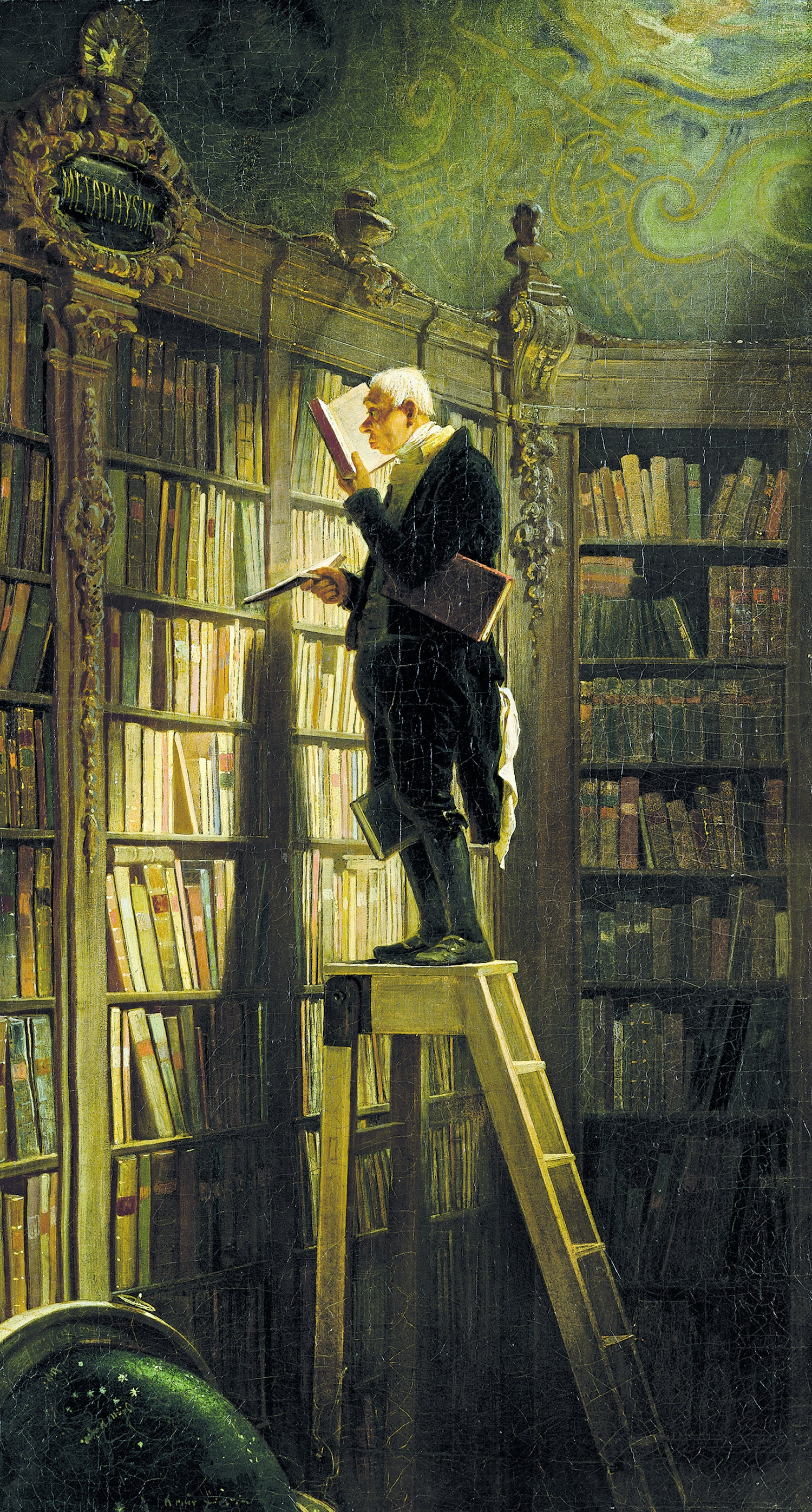
The Bookworm, an 1850 painting, depicting a library by Carl Spitzweg

The word library also refers to a room in a private house in which books are kept. Generally, it is a relatively large room that is open to all family members and household guests, in contrast to a study, which also often contains a collection of books but is usually a private space intended to be used by one person.

== Famous private libraries ==
- Queen Elizabeth II's library in Windsor Castle
- Tianyi Pavilion – the oldest private library in Asia; located in Ningbo, Zhejiang, China
- Library of Sir Thomas Browne disposed of by auction in 1711
- Bibliotheca Lindesiana
- Hakim Syed Zillur Rahman Library located in Aligarh, India
- Library of the History of Human Imagination, Jay Walker's private library in Ridgefield, Connecticut
- Morgan Library & Museum houses J. P. Morgan's collection in New York City
- The Library of Rudolf Steiner
- George Washington Vanderbilt's library in Biltmore Estate

== See also ==
- Book collecting
