= Courthouse Historic District (Kalispell, Montana) =

Historic district in Montana, United States

- U.S. National Register of Historic Places
- U.S. Historic district
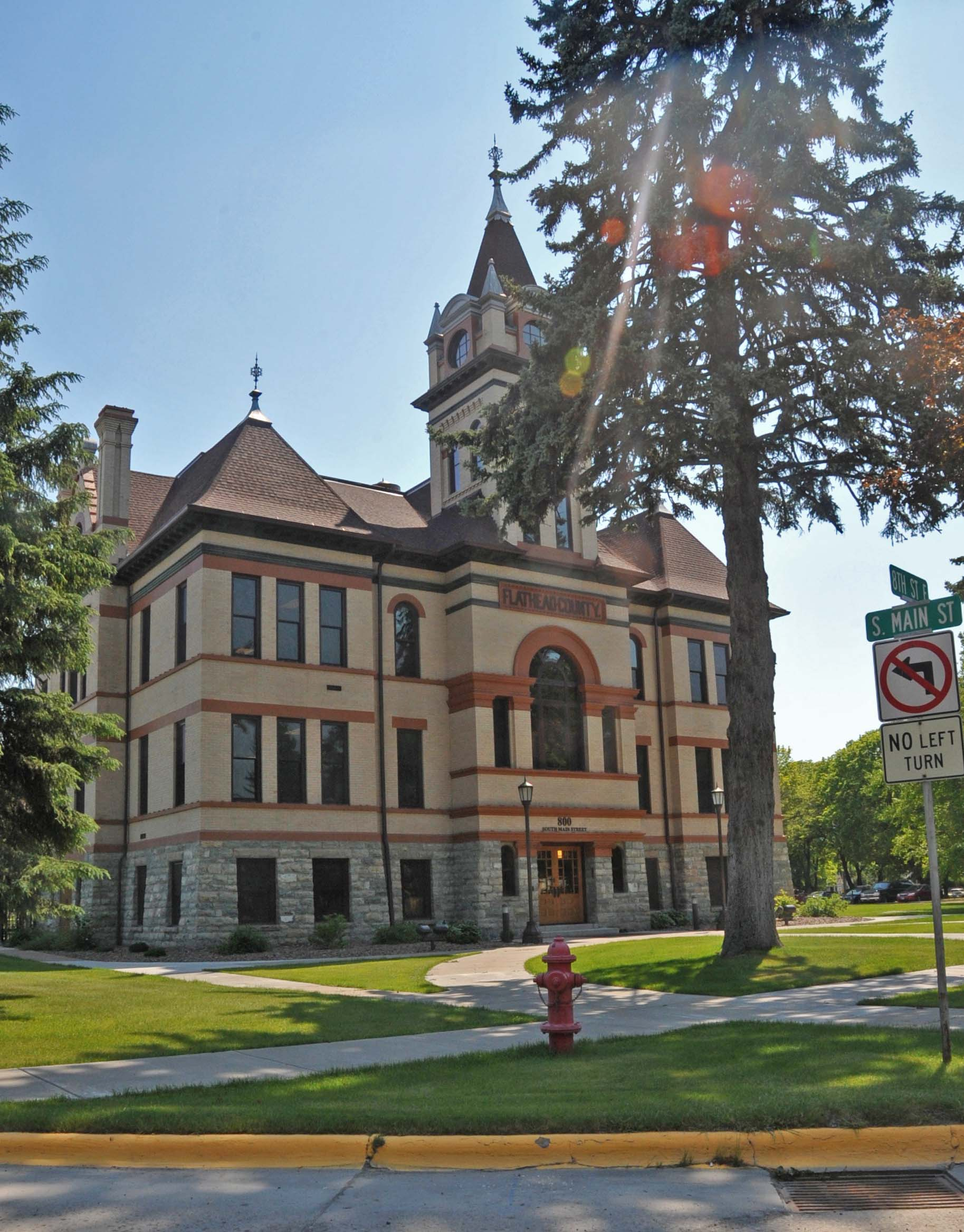

- Location within Montana Location within the United States
- Interactive map showing the location of Courthouse Historic District, Kalispell
- Location: 500-800 blocks of Main St., Kalispell, Montana
- Coordinates: 48°11′29″N 114°18′37″W
- Area: 10 acres (4.0 ha)
- Built: 1903
- Architect: Fred Brinkman, C.E. Bell, James A. Ford.
- Architectural style: Modern Movement, Bungalow/craftsman, Late 19th And 20th Century Revivals
- MPS: Kalispell MPS
- NRHP reference No.: 94000879
- Added to NRHP: August 24, 1994

The Courthouse Historic District in Kalispell, Montana is a 10 acres (4.0 ha) historic district which was listed on the National Register of Historic Places in 1994. It included 18 contributing buildings and one contributing site.

It includes the 800-1000 blocks of Main St. in Kalispell.

It includes the Flathead County Courthouse, built in 1903. It includes the two-story, flat-roofed Waggener & Campbell Funeral Home designed by architect Fred Brinkman.
