= Hot Springs Airport =

- IATA: none; ICAO: none; FAA LID: S09

Summary
- Airport type: Public
- Owner: Sanders County
- Serves: Hot Springs, Montana
- Elevation AMSL: 2,763 ft (842 m)
- Coordinates: 47°36′45″N 114°36′48″W

Map
- Location of airport in Montana

Runways
Direction	Length		Surface
Direction	ft	m	Surface
6/24	3,550	1,082	Asphalt/treated

Statistics (2008)
- Aircraft operations: 500
- Source: Federal Aviation Administration

Hot Springs Airport (FAA LID: S09) is a county-owned public-use airport in Sanders County, Montana, United States. It is located two nautical miles (4 km) east of the central business district of Hot Springs, Montana, a town on the Flathead Indian Reservation.

== Facilities and aircraft ==
Hot Springs Airport covers an area of 117 acres (47 ha) at an elevation of 2,763 feet (842 m) above mean sea level. It has one runway designated 6/24 with an asphalt measuring 3,550 by 45 feet (1,082 x 14 m). For the 12-month period ending July 22, 2008, the airport had 500 general aviation aircraft operations, an average of 41 per month.

== See also ==
- List of airports in Montana
