= Anderson Style Shop =

- U.S. National Register of Historic Places
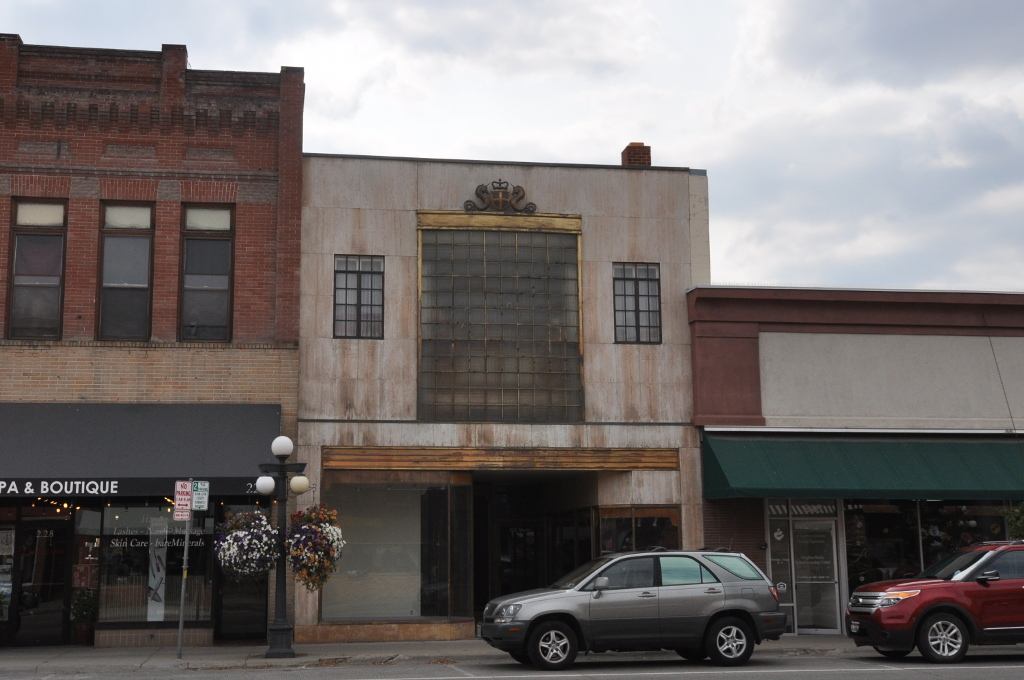

- Location within Montana Location within the United States
- Location: 222 Main St., Kalispell, Montana
- Coordinates: 48°11′46″N 114°18′44″W
- Area: less than one acre
- Built: 1941
- Architect: Fred Brinkman
- Architectural style: Moderne
- MPS: Kalispell MPS
- NRHP reference No.: 94000870
- Added to NRHP: August 24, 1994

The Anderson Style Shop, at 222 Main St. in Kalispell, Montana, was built in 1941. It was designed by Kalispell architect Fred Brinkman in Moderne style. It was listed on the National Register of Historic Places in 1994.

The original store on lot was moved to there from Demerville in 1891 or 1892. The current building was built in 1941 at cost of $17,500 for storeowner Carl Anderson.

It was deemed significant for its "distinctive commercial facade on Kalispell's Main Street".
