= Charles Boles House =

Historic house in Montana, United States

- U.S. National Register of Historic Places
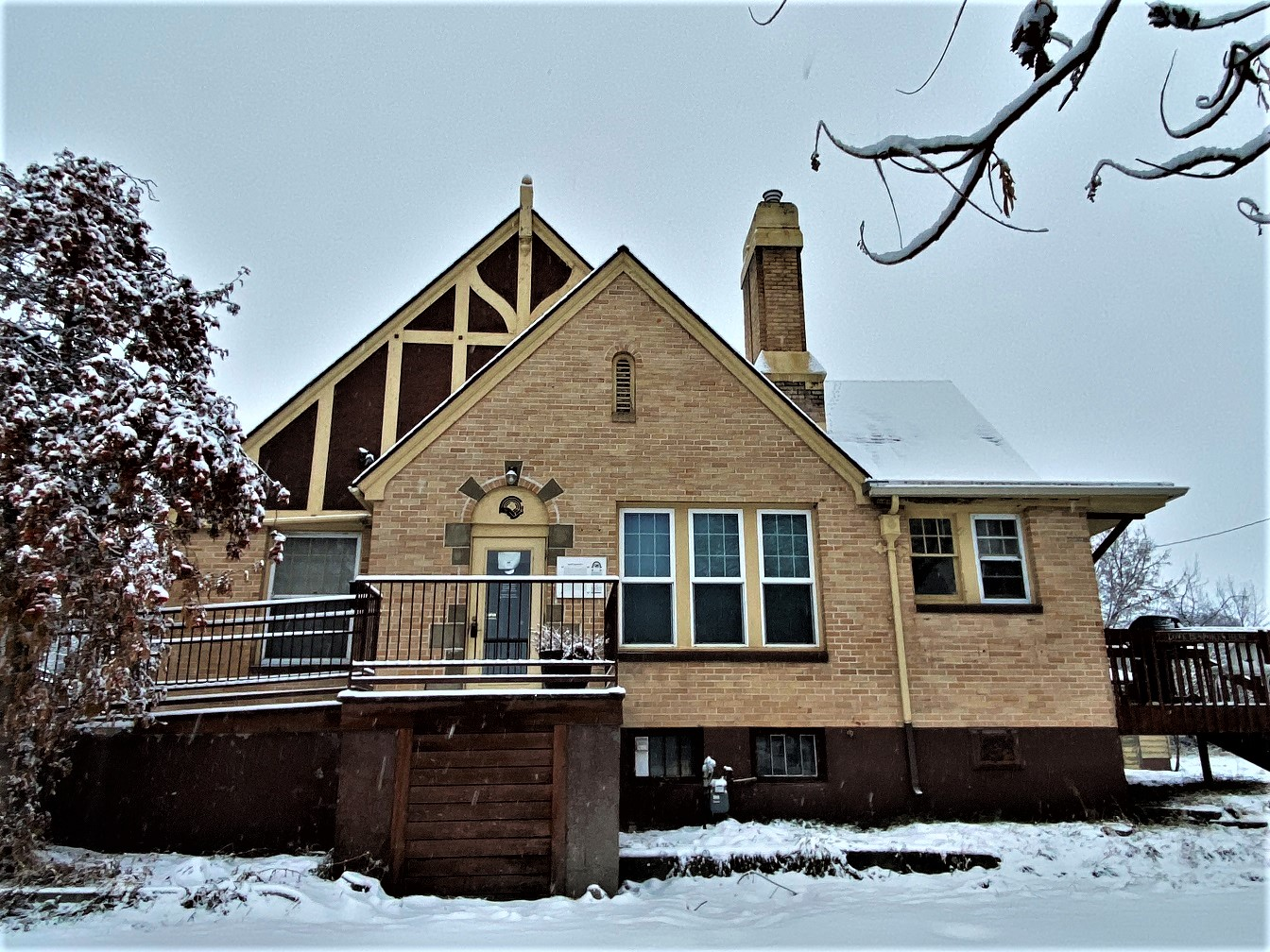

- Location within Montana Location within the United States
- Location: 40 Appleway Dr., Kalispell, Montana
- Coordinates: 48°11′50″N 114°20′05″W
- Area: less than one acre
- Built: 1932
- Architect: Fred Brinkman
- Architectural style: Tudor Revival
- MPS: Kalispell MPS
- NRHP reference No.: 06000041
- Added to NRHP: February 14, 2006

The Charles Boles House, located at 40 Appleway Dr. in Kalispell, Montana, United States, is a Tudor Revival-style house built in 1932. It was listed on the National Register of Historic Places in 2006.

It has also been known as the Jack and LeEtta Carver Residence and as the United Way Building.

It was designed by architect Fred Brinkman, who designed more than 80 residences, churches, and commercial buildings in Kalispell.
