= Brice Apartments =

- U.S. National Register of Historic Places
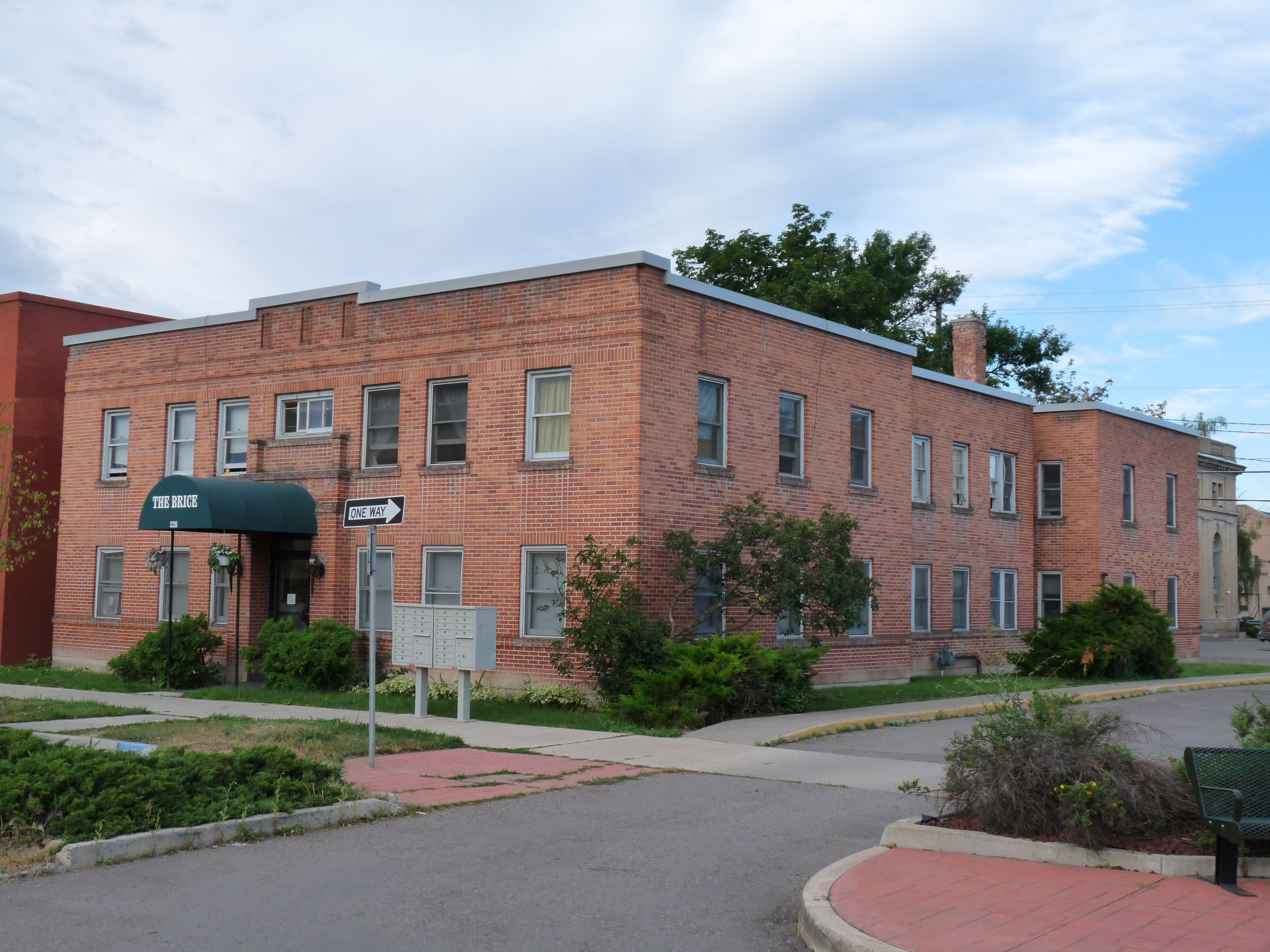

- Location within Montana Location within the United States
- Location: 228 2nd Ave. E., Kalispell, Montana
- Coordinates: 48°11′47″N 114°18′38″W
- Area: less than one acre
- Built: 1936
- Built by: B. Brice Gilliland
- Architect: Fred Brinkman
- Architectural style: Starved Classicism
- MPS: Kalispell MPS
- NRHP reference No.: 94000875
- Added to NRHP: August 24, 1994

The Brice Apartments, located at 228 2nd Ave. E. in Kalispell, Montana, were built in 1936. They were listed on the National Register of Historic Places in 1994.

They were designed by architect Fred Brinkman and built by contractor B. Brice Gilliland in the Starved Classical architecture style. Gilliland built them "for his daughter Gussie to manage for income after her retirement from teaching." The complex is "the only surviving brick apartment house built in Kalispell during the pre-World War II period."
