= Mark P. Finlay =

American architect

- Born: January 25, 1953 (age 73); Kansas City, Missouri
- Education: Wentworth Institute of Technology; University of Kentucky
- Occupation: Architect
- Spouse: Jeanne Callaway Finlay (1985–present)
- Children: 4
- Website: www.markfinlay.com

Mark P. Finlay (born January 25, 1953) is an American architect and member of the American Institute of Architects, whose firms, Mark P. Finlay Architects, AIA and Mark P. Finlay Interiors, LLC are in Southport, Connecticut.

== Early life ==
Mark P. Finlay was born in Kansas City, Missouri and spent his early childhood in the Chicago suburb of Northbrook, Illinois. In 1967, Finlay and his family relocated to New Canaan, Connecticut.

== Education ==
Finlay went on to study at the Wentworth Institute of Technology in Boston, Massachusetts. While at Wentworth, Finlay served as class president and was captain of the hockey team. After earning his associate degree in Architectural Engineering Technology, he continued his studies at the University of Kentucky in Lexington, where he earned top honors in architectural design and received his Bachelor of Architecture degree. During his last semester at the University of Kentucky, Finlay traveled to Paris, France and Venice, Italy to study classical art and architecture. He is a member of the Tau Sigma Delta Honor Society in Architecture and Allied Arts.

== Career ==
After college, Finlay went to work for the firm of Roche-Dinkeloo in Hamden, Connecticut for seven years. While there, he worked on designs and production for large scale corporate and institutional projects, including the Metropolitan Museum of Art in New York City, General Foods Corporation Headquarters, Denver Center of Performing Arts, Central Park Zoo, and the Union Carbide Corporation World Headquarters.

Finlay was inducted into the New England Design Hall of Fame in 2018 for his work in architecture.

== Mark P. Finlay Architects, AIA ==
In 1984, Finlay established Mark P. Finlay Architects, AIA, seeking a greater level of contextualism and comfort in his designs, particularly in residential projects.

In 2008, The Library of the History of Human Imagination, a Mark P. Finlay-designed private library, was the subject of a three-part TED Talk by Jay Walker. The 3,600 square foot library contains 38,000 books and numerous museum-quality artifacts.

In 2012, HGTV's 'Million Dollar Rooms' featured a Connecticut barn designed by the firm. MTV's 'Teen Cribs' showcased a private residence in Connecticut, and the residence also served as the set for the Disney film Old Dogs.

In 2013, Mark P. Finlay Architects, AIA expanded to include an in-house interior design team, Mark P. Finlay Interiors, LLC. Mark P. Finlay Architects, AIA employs over thirty professionals, including four partners and over a dozen architectural associates.

Finlay is a member of the American Institute of Architects, the Institute of Classical Architecture and Art, and the Connecticut Society of Architects.

The firm's current club projects include Fishers Island Club in Fisher's Island, New York and Eastward Ho! in Chatham, MA.

== Personal life ==
Finlay and his wife, Jeanne Callaway Finlay, live in Fairfield, Connecticut and have four children: Page, Dirk, Chase, and Luke.
