= Hot Springs, Montana =

Hot Springs, Montana nayyákʷ Kutmiʔk
- Town
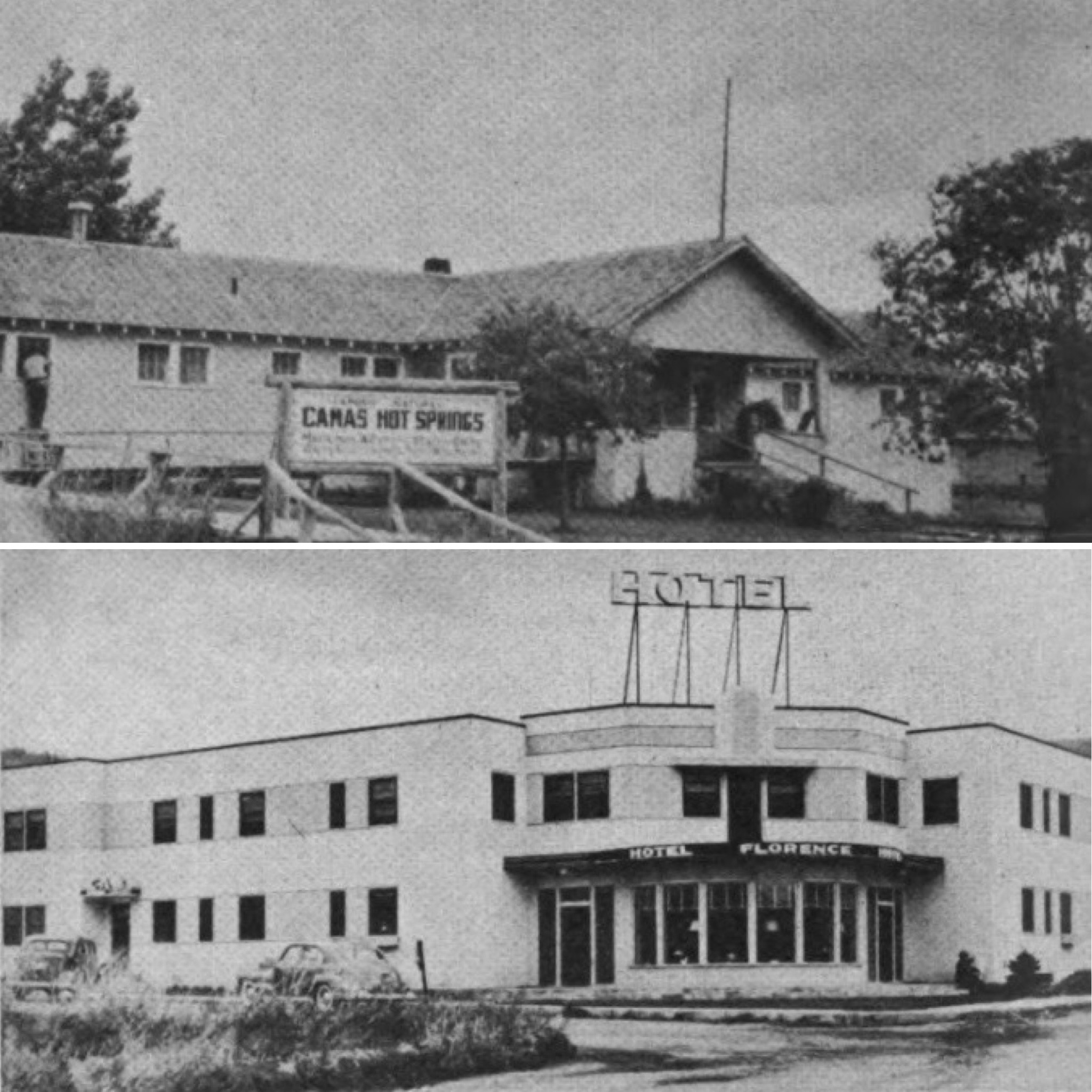
- Hotels in Hot Springs, Montana c. 1947
- Motto(s): "Limp in, Leap out"
- Location of Hot Springs, Montana
- Coordinates: 47°36′32″N 114°40′19″W
- Country: United States
- State: Montana
- County: Sanders
- Founded: 1900

Area
  - Total: 0.38 sq mi (0.99 km^{2})
  - Land: 0.38 sq mi (0.99 km^{2})
  - Water: 0 sq mi (0.00 km^{2})
- Elevation: 2,841 ft (866 m)

Population (2020)
  - Total: 557
  - Density: 1,451.7/sq mi (560.51/km^{2})
- Time zone: UTC-7 (Mountain (MST))
  - Summer (DST): UTC-6 (MDT)
- ZIP code: 59845
- Area code: 406
- FIPS code: 30-37825
- GNIS feature ID: 0772580
- Website: townofhotspringsmt.com

Hot Springs (Montana Salish: nayyákʷ, Kutenai: Kutmiʔk) is a town on the Flathead Indian Reservation in Sanders County, Montana, United States. The population was 557 at the 2020 census.

Founded as the settlements of Pineville and Camas in the 1890s, the town was incorporated in 1929.

Previously it was known as both Camas and Camas Hot Springs for the camas plant that grows abundantly in the region as part of the camas prairie habitat.

== Geography ==
According to the United States Census Bureau, the town has a total area of 0.38 square miles (0.98 km^{2}), all land.

It is located near several mineral hot springs, including Camas Hot Springs and Wild Horse Hot Springs. The town's motto "Limp In, Leap Out" refers to the perceived therapeutic value of these waters.

== Communications ==
The town of Hot Springs was featured in an article in Time magazine regarding cell phone service. In 2012, the town had a single cell phone tower operated by the Hot Springs Telephone Company, with ATT service. Wi-Fi was only available in selected locations in and around town. As of 2025 AT&T T-Mobile and Verizon are all available.

== Demographics ==
Historical population
Census	Pop.	Note	%±
1930	447		—
1940	663		48.3%
1950	733		10.6%
1960	585		−20.2%
1970	664		13.5%
1980	601		−9.5%
1990	411		−31.6%
2000	531		29.2%
2010	544		2.4%
2020	557		2.4%
U.S. Decennial Census

=== 2010 census ===
As of the census of 2010, there were 544 people, 297 households, and 108 families living in the town. The population density was 1,431.6 inhabitants per square mile (552.7/km^{2}). There were 392 housing units at an average density of 1,031.6 per square mile (398.3/km^{2}). The racial makeup of the town was 77.8% White, 0.6% African American, 9.9% Native American, 0.2% Asian, 1.7% from other races, and 9.9% from two or more races. Hispanic or Latino of any race were 4.2% of the population.

There were 297 households, of which 17.8% had children under the age of 18 living with them, 22.2% were married couples living together, 10.1% had a female householder with no husband present, 4.0% had a male householder with no wife present, and 63.6% were non-families. 55.9% of all households were made up of individuals, and 23.2% had someone living alone who was 65 years of age or older. The average household size was 1.72 and the average family size was 2.64.

The median age in the town was 54 years. 15.8% of residents were under the age of 18; 5.6% were between the ages of 18 and 24; 14.7% were from 25 to 44; 37% were from 45 to 64; and 26.8% were 65 years of age or older. The gender makeup of the town was 47.2% male and 52.8% female.

=== 2000 census ===
As of the census of 2000, there were 531 people, 280 households, and 126 families living in the town. The population density was 1,739.1 inhabitants per square mile (671.5/km^{2}). There were 385 housing units at an average density of 1,260.9 per square mile (486.8/km^{2}). The racial makeup of the town was 84.93% White, 0.19% African American, 9.98% Native American, 0.19% Asian, 1.13% from other races, and 3.58% from two or more races. Hispanic or Latino of any race were 3.58% of the population.

There were 280 households, out of which 16.4% had children under the age of 18 living with them, 33.6% were married couples living together, 8.9% had a female householder with no husband present, and 55.0% were non-families. 50.7% of all households were made up of individuals, and 23.6% had someone living alone who was 65 years of age or older. The average household size was 1.81 and the average family size was 2.64.

In the town, the population was spread out, with 18.3% under the age of 18, 2.4% from 18 to 24, 21.8% from 25 to 44, 29.2% from 45 to 64, and 28.2% who were 65 years of age or older. The median age was 50 years. For every 100 females there were 87.0 males. For every 100 females age 18 and over, there were 84.7 males.

The median income for a household in the town was $12,663, and the median income for a family was $21,786. Males had a median income of $26,250 versus $13,750 for females. The per capita income for the town was $12,690. About 33.3% of families and 38.2% of the population were below the poverty line, including 50.8% of those under age 18 and 20.2% of those age 65 or over.

== Culture ==
Hot Springs is popular to visitors for its hot springs pools where people come and soak in the mineral water. Hotel accommodations include the NHRP-listed Symes Hotel, and Alameda's, a "vintage 1930s spa motel", that offers private baths in lithium-rich mineral waters sourced from wells on the Alameda's property.

Another big attraction is the "Hot Springs Artists Society" which does many things but is most noted for bringing musical groups to a local Hotel at least twice per week, Fridays and Saturdays. The music genres are generally "blues", "folk", "country" or some combination of all three from local and visiting artists. Occasionally there are special concerts of artists which may include a special concert on Sunday. In summer, the stage moves outdoors.

Popular with tourists is also LaRue Hot Springs Museum.

Preston Hot Springs Library serves the area.

== Government ==
Hot Springs has a mayor and city council, both with four year terms. Randal Woods has been mayor of the town since at least 2016. He defeated Robert L. Jackson in the 2025 elections.

== Education ==
Hot Springs School District educates students from kindergarten through 12th grade. In the 2021–2022 school year, 179 students were enrolled. The district has 3 schools.

Hot Springs High School's team name is Savage Heat.

== Media ==
The Sanders County Ledger is a local newspaper along with the Clark Fork Valley Press. Both are printed weekly and also available online.

The FM radio station KJFK-LP is licensed in Hot Springs.

== Infrastructure ==
Montana Highway 28 is east of town.

The Hot Springs Airport is a county-owned public-use airport located two nautical miles (4 km) east of the central business district of Hot Springs. The nearest commercial airports are Glacier Park International Airport, 73 miles (117 km) north, or Missoula Montana Airport, 71 miles (114 km) south.

Sanders County Transportation operates shuttle vans and buses to and from several cities and towns in Sanders, Flathead and Missoula Counties.

== See also ==
- List of municipalities in Montana
