= Tau Sigma Delta =

American architectural honor society

- ΤΣΔ
- Founded: May 1913; 113 years ago University of Michigan
- Type: Honor
- Affiliation: ACHS
- Status: Active
- Emphasis: Architecture
- Scope: National
- Motto: Technitai Sophoi kai Dexioi "Craftsmen, Skilled and Trained"
- Colors: White and Gold
- Symbol: Drafting triangle
- Chapters: 52
- Members: 19,000+ lifetime
- Headquarters: College of Communication, Architecture + The Arts PCA 263-B 11200 SW 8th Street; Miami, Florida 33199; United States
- Website: www.tausigmadelta.org

Tau Sigma Delta (ΤΣΔ) is an American scholastic honor society that recognizes academic achievement among students in the field of architecture and allied arts.

== History ==
Tau Sigma Delta was organized at the University of Michigan as an honorary fraternity in architecture and landscape design in May 1913, at the proposal and under the direction of the Departments of Architecture and Landscape Design faculty members at the University of Michigan. It was first known as Tau Delta Sigma and continued under that name until the fall of 1914 when it was decided to change the name to the present one there being Greek letter societies already bearing the first name. It was the intention of the founders that the organization should be a national society as an opportunity for its extension to other schools and universities could be had.

As of 1920, according to the constitution of Tau Sigma Delta, the purpose of the society is stated as follows: "It shall be the purpose of Tau Sigma Delta fraternity to unite in a firm bond of friendship, such students of architecture and the allied arts, whose marked scholastic ability, moral character and pleasing personality has shown them worthy of distinction, and to foster and promote high standards of study in the schools and colleges of architecture and the allied arts." The society is purely an honorary organization, and only a few new members are elected annually. As of 1920, the total membership of the society was 88.

Each chapter has a definite plan of government and elects its members, who are chosen only upon the approval of the faculty of the school where the chapter is located.

Medals are awarded for achievement, in bronze, silver, and gold. In 2011, it had chartered 52 chapters and initiated 18,984 members.

== Symbols ==
The fraternity's motto is Technitai, Sophoi kai Dexioi or "Craftsmen, Skilled and Trained". Its colors are gold and white. The flower of the society is the red rose. Its symbol is the drafting triangle.

The fraternity's badge is a gold key consisting of the crossed letters, Tau Sigma Delta, a suspension ring at the top, and a pendant at the bottom. The crossed letters of the same arrangement as on the key is the crest of the fraternity. Honor stoles are available for graduation regalia. The pledge button consists of an outer scalloped band of gold within which is one concentric ring of gold and two concentric rings of white.

== Chapters ==
Tau Sigma Delta has chartered more than 52 chaptes.

== Gold Medal Recipients ==
The Gold Medal is awarded by the Grand Chapter of the Society to a professional or professionals with a record of high distinction in design in the field of architecture, landscape architecture, or the allied arts. The award is presented annually as a part of the Association of Collegiate Schools of Architecture (ACSA) national meeting.

- 2019 Wang Shu and Lu Wenyu
- 2018 Tod Williams and Billie Tsien
- 2017 Maurice Cox
- 2016 Toshiko Mori
- 2015 Thom Mayne
- 2014 Bernard Tschumi
- 2013 Gregg Pasquarelli
- 2012 Teddy Cruz
- 2011 David Adjaye
- 2010 Marion Weiss and Michael Manfredi
- 2009 Patricia Patkau
- 2008 Elizabeth Diller
- 2007 Richard Rogers
- 2006 Shigeru Ban
- 2005 Martha Schwartz
- 2004 Mary Miss
- 2003 Michael Graves
- 2002 Cynthia Weese
- 2001 Malcolm Holzman
- 2000 Pierre Koenig
- 1999 William J. R. Curtis
- 1998 William Pedersen
- 1997 César Pelli
- 1996 Vincent Scully
- 1995 Peter Eisenman
- 1994 Harvey B. Gantt
- 1993 Harold L. Adams
- 1991 Denise Scott Brown
- 1990 Joseph Esherick
- 1989 Richard Meier
- 1988 Kenneth Frampton
- 1987 Lawrence Halprin
- 1986 Walter Netsch
- 1985 Pietro Belluschi
- 1984 Fay Jones
- 1983 Ricardo Legorreta
- 1982 Moshe Safdie
- 1981 & 1992 Charles Moore
- 1980 Alexander Girard
- 1979 Edmund Bacon
- 1978 William Caudill
- 1977 Harry Weese
- 1976 Vincent Kling
- 1975 Hugh Stubbins
- 1974 Ian McHarg
- 1973 Arthur Erickson
- 1972 O'Neil Ford
- 1971 Gunnar Birkerts
- 1970 Norman Fletcher

== Notable members ==
Notable and honorary members of Tau Sigma Delta include:

- Howard R. Barr, architect
- Donald Barthelme (Epsilon), architect
- Fred Brinkman, architect
- Rolv Enge, Norwegian resistance member and architect
- Mark P. Finlay, architect
- Herbert F. Maddalene, archirect
- Ivan Meštrović (Delta, honorary), sculptor and architect
- Aaron Neubert, architect
- Lyman S. Perry, member of the 1960 Olympic rowing teamr and rowing coach at the United States Naval Academy and University of Pennsylvania
- Eliel Saarinen (Alpha, honorary), architect

== See also ==
- Association of College Honor Societies
- Professional fraternities and sororities
