= Kalispell Main Street Historic District =

Historic district in Montana, United States

- Kalispell Main Street Historic District and Boundary Increase
- U.S. National Register of Historic Places
- U.S. Historic district
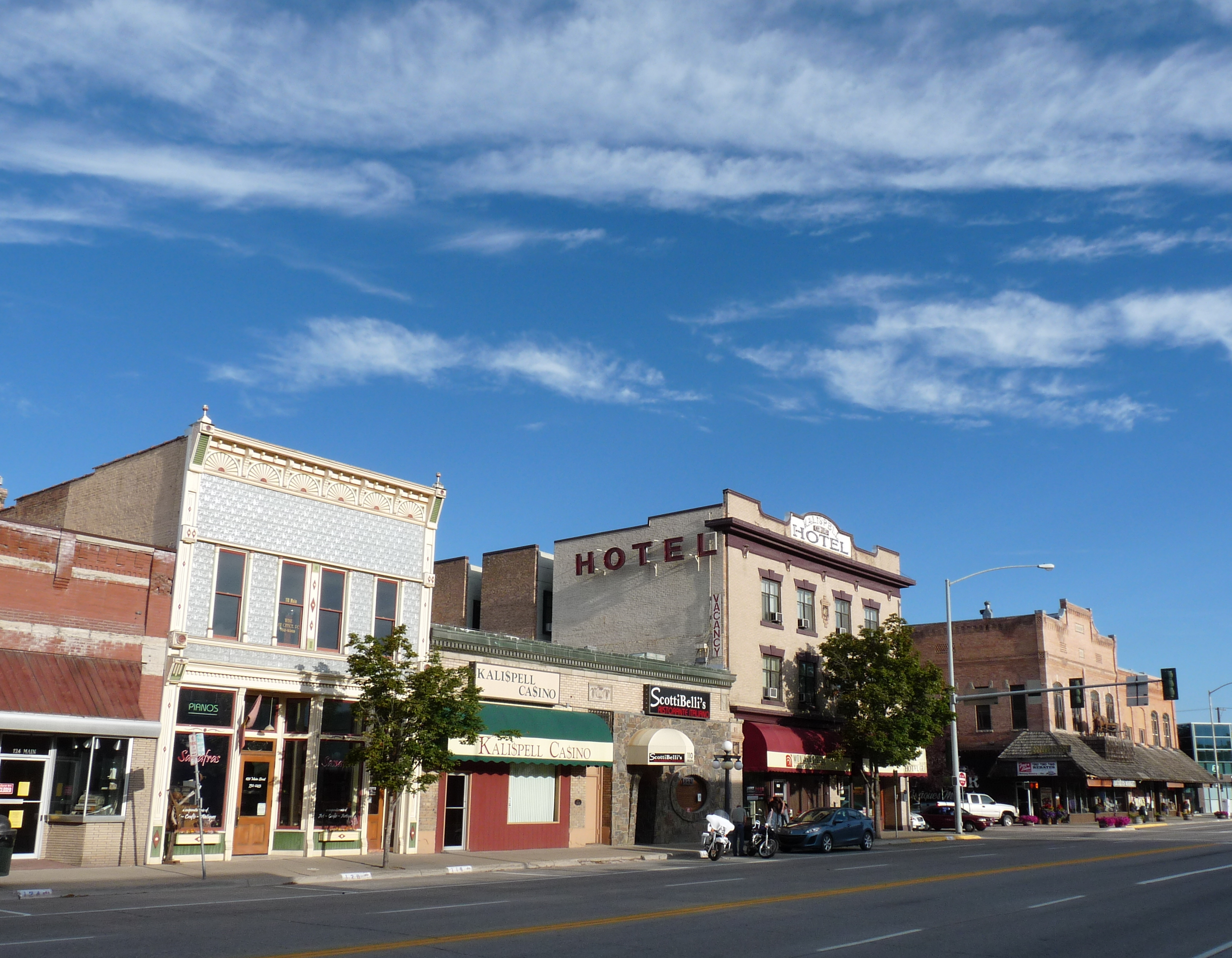

- Location within Montana Location within the United States
- Location: 34-343 Main St. and 116-142 1st Ave., E. (original); roughly bounded by Center St. to the north, 5th St. to the south, and the north and south running alleys to the west of Main St. (increase)
- Nearest city: Kalispell, Montana
- Coordinates: 48°11′48″N 114°18′42″W
- Built: 1891
- Architect: George Shanley
- Architectural style: Queen Anne, Romanesque
- MPS: Kalispell MPS
- NRHP reference No.: 94000904 (original); 10000633 (increase)
- Added to NRHP: August 24, 1994 (original); September 3, 2010 (increase)

The Kalispell Main Street Historic District is a historic district in Kalispell, Montana, United States. It was listed on the National Register of Historic Places in 1994, under the name "Main Street Commercial Historic District." Sixteen years later, the district was renamed and its boundaries were expanded.
