= Wild Horse Hot Springs =

Geothermal site in Montana

- Camp Aqua Bath House
- Location within Montana
- Interactive map of Wild Horse Hot Springs
- Location: Hot Springs, Montana, Little Bitterroot Valley, Lake County, Montana
- Coordinates: 47.6408°N 114.5726°W
- Spring source: Mother Dragon geyser
- Type: geothermal
- Discharge: 1,200 gallons per minute
- Temperature: 128 °F (53 °C)

Wild Horse Hot Springs is located 2.5 miles (4.0 km) outside of the town of Hot Springs, in Lake County, Montana, United States. Wild Horse was developed in 1913 when a well driller hit 128 °F (53 °C) hot water, and has "private plunges, but little else." Wild Horse was originally known as Camp Aqua Bath House.

== History ==
In 1912, Molly Bartlett, a homesteader discovered the hot springs by accident while drilling a well for drinking water, washing and irrigation water. Molly Bartlett, born Mary Hughes Smith, was a daughter of Robert B. Smith, the third governor of the state of Montana.

In 1941 Bartlett raised monies for a project named the Montana Warm Water Project for Crippled Children to construct a polio treatment center for children named Camp Aqua. A public resort was later built in the early 1980s funded by a Montana renewable energy grant. The name was changed to Wild Horse Hot Springs in the early 1990s when the property changed owners and shifted from public to private. It was further developed as a geothermal energy turbine site in 2012 by the Flathead Electric Cooperative.

== Description ==
There are 6 soaking pools at the rustic resort. Camping cabins, RVs, tents and teepee-style lodging is available on site.

== Water profile ==
The hot springs are fed by the Mother Dragon geyser. The mineral content of the water includes bicarbonate, calcium, carbonate, iron, manganese, magnesium, potassium, silica, sodium, sulfate, among others.

The hot mineral water emerges from the source at 120 °F (49 °C) to 128 °F (53 °C), and cooles to 104 °F (40 °C) in the soaking pools and private plunges.

== Incidents ==
In 2013, Melvin Madplume Jr. raped and murdered his cousin Laurence Kenmille at the site. Madplume was sentenced to life in prison without parole. In 2020, a woman was found dead in one of the hot springs soaking pools.

== See also ==
- List of hot springs in the United States § Montana
