= The Library of the History of Human Imagination =

Private library in Ridgefield, Connecticut, US

The Walker Library of the History of Human Imagination is a private library and collection of artistic, scientific, and historical artefacts. The Library was founded and is owned by Jay Walker.

The 3,600-square-foot facility is a wing of Walker’s home in Ridgefield, Connecticut. It contains about 30,000 books as well as maps, charts, artworks, and a wide variety of museum-level artefacts. It is not open to the public.

== Architecture and art ==
The Library was constructed in 2002 to house and showcase a collection of books and artifacts that Walker had been assembling for two decades.

Designed by architect Mark P. Finlay and owner Jay S. Walker, the room combines traditional architecture with floating platforms, multiple stairways, and a glass bridge. The bridge connects the entryway at the middle of three levels. Sound and lighting were designed by artist Clyde Lynds with architectural lighting design by Lana L. Lenar. A series of approximately 3x4 etched glass panels are used as part of the railings around the stairs and platforms. Each of the nearly 200 etched plates depicts a seminal invention in human history in symbolic form.

== Contents ==
Items on display at the Walker Library include an original 1957 Russian Sputnik, the world’s first space satellite (one of several backups built by the USSR), and the U.S. response, a Vanguard satellite made from surviving parts of the American satellite that exploded on the launch pad.

One of two known anastatic facsimiles of the original 1776 U.S. Declaration of Independence, made directly from the original using a wet-copy process.

The Harmonia Macrocosmica by Andreaus Cellarius. This 1660 atlas included the first published heliocentric depiction of the Solar System.

"The Flayed Angel", was published in Paris by the anatomist and artist Jacques Gautier d'Agoty in 1745. This is a three-foot-high, colour portrait of a nude, seated woman, viewed from the back with her face turned in a three-quarter profile. Her back is slit open up the spine, and her skin and muscles are peeled aside on both left and right to reveal the ribs and spine beneath.

A White House cocktail napkin, circa March, 1942, upon which President Franklin D. Roosevelt briefly outlined his three-point strategy for winning World War II in his own handwriting. The president jotted down his thoughts on the napkin during a Rose Garden meeting with U.S. Army Air Corps General Hap Arnold, who took the napkin back to the Pentagon where it remained classified for many years.

Additional artifacts in the Library include:

- A page from an original Gutenberg Bible.
- A complete skeleton of a juvenile raptor dinosaur, about the size of a large house cat.
- An 1890 Edison sound recording and playback device that plays wax cylinder recordings.
- A wooden sarcophagus from ancient Egypt, dated to approximately 1,800 BC.
- A working Nazi Enigma device for encrypted communication.
- A copy of Robert Hooke’s 1666 book Micrographia, containing some of the earliest published depictions of insects, leaves and other objects as seen under a microscope.
- An instruction manual for NASA’s Saturn V rocket.
- A chandelier from the James Bond film Die Another Day, rewired with 6,000 LEDs.
- The first book designed as a work of art in and of itself, Goethe’s 1828 Faust, with illustrations by Delacroix. The Library’s copy features a carved leather binding.
- Various medical artefacts including glass eyes and field surgical instruments from the U.S. Civil War.
- A first edition Encyclopædia Britannica, published in 1768.
- A U.S. flag flown to the Moon and back on Apollo 11, the first human lunar landing.
- A 1667 publication called "Bills of Mortality" tracked numbers and causes of death in London during the time of the Great Plague.
- Anatomical illustrations produced from 1805-1813 by Italian artist and physician Paolo Mascagni, who used a scalpel and iodine to document human systems in hand-painted, life-size illustrations.
- The first published illustration of amputation, from a 1532 German book of military field surgery. This hand-painted copy is stained with human blood on the cover.
- A military field surgical kit, circa 1900, including saws, clamps, and tools in a portable wooden box.
