= Symes Hotel =

Historic resort, Hot Springs, Montana

- U.S. National Register of Historic Places
- Lemeroux Springs
- Symes Medical Springs
- Symes Medicine Springs
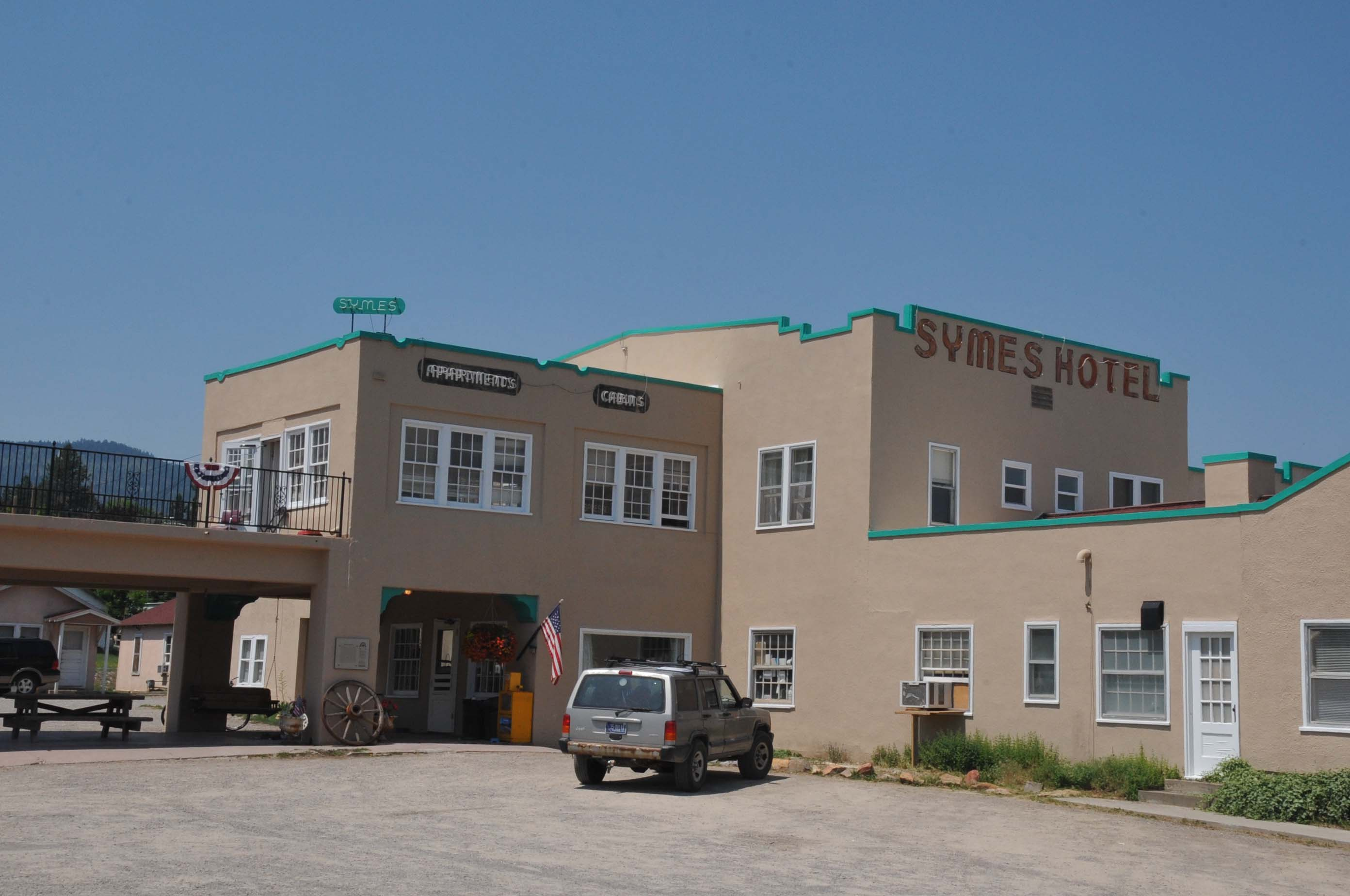

- Location within Montana Location within the United States
- Location: 209 N. Wall St., Hot Springs, Montana
- Coordinates: 47°36′37″N 114°40′16″W
- Area: 2.7 acres (1.1 ha)
- Built: 1929
- Architectural style: Mission/spanish Revival
- NRHP reference No.: 98001363
- Added to NRHP: November 12, 1998

The Symes Hotel is a historic building in Hot Springs, Montana. It was built in Mission/Spanish Revival style during 1929–1930. It was listed on the National Register of Historic Places in 1998; the listing included 10 contributing buildings and one contributing structure. It has also been known as Symes Medical Springs and as Symes Medicine Springs.

== History ==
The area now known as Hot Springs, Montana is located within the Little Bitteroot River Valley. Long before Euro-American fur trappers and settlers arrived, the Kootenai, Flathead, Pend d'Oreille and Kalispell Indigenous peoples inhabited this area. In 1842, Father Pierre-Jean de Smet, a Jesuit missionary recorded the thermal springs that were used by the local Indigenous people who "after the fatigues of a long journey, they find that bathing in this water greatly refreshes them."

This hot springs were known as Lemeroux Springs prior to 1929 when Fred Symes purchased a three-acre tract of land in what is now the central business district of Hot Springs, Montana. The hotel was built for $50,000 by Symes. It had 20 hot spring-fed baths to start, and did well even during the Depression. The hotel has 28 rooms, nine apartments, and nine cabins.

Still a working hotel, with 30 employees, Symes is one of the area's major employers.

== Description ==
The Spanish influenced Mission style Symes hotel was completed in 1930. The symmetrical facade features a central wing that was built somewhat higher than the end wings of the structure. The gable ends are hidden by curvilinear parapets, below which are round openings inset with quatrefoil designs. The roof is covered with hexagonal multi-colored tiles. The walls are stucco, window sashes are multi-paned. A sign reading "Medical Springs" was situated over the port-cochere that was supported by large square columns with decorative brackets. By 1940, a new two story wing was built to house additional lodging accommodations on the top floor with apartments below for long-term patrons.

In addition to the hotel building other structures on the property included the boiler/laundry building, built in 1929; the coal shed from approximately 1929; the garage/workshop, built around 1935; and six tourist cabins built in 1940.
