= List of lakes of Alaska =

Alaska has about 3,197 officially named natural lakes, more than 409,000 natural lakes at least one hectare or bigger, approximately 67 named artificial reservoirs, and 167 named dams. For named artificial reservoirs and dams, see the List of dams and reservoirs in Alaska. Swimming, fishing, and/or boating are permitted in some of these lakes, but not all.

== List ==
Name	GNIS Feature ID # Link	Coordinates	Elevation	Surface area square miles (Acres)	Municipality	Borough or Census area
Abercrombie Lake	1419509	57°49′59″N 152°21′17″W	20 feet (6.1 m)	0.029 mi^{2} (18.7 ac)		Kodiak
Abyss Lake	1420004	58°30′31″N 136°36′55″W	892 feet (272 m)	0.99 mi^{2} (635 ac)		Hoonah-Angoon
Ace Lake	1397903	64°51′48″N 147°55′58″W	577 feet (176 m)			Fairbanks North Star
Agassiz Lakes	1416413	60°08′14″N 141°00′12″W	1,749 feet (533 m)			Valdez-Cordova, Yakutat
Aghnaghak Lagoon	1397948	63°38′21″N 171°36′28″W	0 feet (0 m)			Nome
Agnes Lake	1397961	65°34′35″N 163°58′22″W	308 feet (94 m)			Nome
Aka Lake	1420037	59°31′01″N 139°47′11″W	13 feet (4.0 m)			Yakutat
Aka Lake	1893218	59°47′00″N 139°47′50″W	0 feet (0 m)			Yakutat
Akwe Lake	1420040	59°20′12″N 138°45′53″W	92 feet (28 m)			Yakutat
Albert Lake	1398063	63°22′30″N 152°30′26″W	1,027 feet (313 m)			Denali
Alder Pond	1828831	60°48′29″N 148°56′49″W	33 feet (10 m)		Anchorage	Anchorage
Aleknagik Lake	1398092	59°20′22″N 158°48′07″W	36 feet (11 m)		Aleknagik	Dillingham
Alexander Lake	1398100	61°44′57″N 150°54′11″W	138 feet (42 m)			Matanuska-Susitna
Lake Alexander	1420062	57°39′56″N 134°10′28″W	341 feet (104 m)			Hoonah-Angoon
Alice Lake	1893267	57°22′00″N 133°17′30″W	2,070 feet (630 m)			Hoonah-Angoon
Allman Lake	1398141	62°16′06″N 161°41′55″W	121 feet (37 m)			Kusilvak
Alma Lakes	1398146	64°01′18″N 150°36′59″W	607 feet (185 m)			Denali
Alsek Lake	1893273	59°10′30″N 138°12′00″W	69 feet (21 m)			Yakutat
Amanka lake						Dillingham
Amos Lakes	1398213	62°51′45″N 152°37′12″W	1,719 feet (524 m)			Denali
Andrew Lake	1418148	51°56′31″N 176°38′17″W	0 feet (0 m)		Adak	Aleutians West
Ankau Saltchucks	1420120	59°32′18″N 139°49′29″W	0 feet (0 m)			Yakutat
Annex Lakes	1398308	58°20′03″N 134°08′20″W	843 feet (257 m)		Juneau	Juneau
Antler Lake	1420130	58°46′37″N 134°49′57″W	1,946 feet (593 m)		Juneau	Juneau
Aropuk Lake	1398401	61°09′43″N 163°47′39″W	3 feet (0.91 m)			Bethel
Atuk Lake	1398457	63°35′41″N 170°26′40″W	1,611 feet (491 m)			Nome
Auke Lake	1398472	58°23′15″N 134°37′51″W	26 feet (7.9 m)		Juneau	Juneau
Ballaine Lake	1398578	64°52′08″N 147°49′23″W	489 feet (149 m)			Fairbanks North Star
Baranof Lake	1420230	57°05′15″N 134°51′57″W	141 feet (43 m)		Sitka	Sitka
Lake Barbara	1398604	61°25′37″N 149°12′39″W	1,175 feet (358 m)		Anchorage	Anchorage
Barkley Lake	1893497	60°43′48″N 141°34′00″W	7,001 feet (2,134 m)			Valdez–Cordova
Bart Lake	1398639	58°13′44″N 134°00′46″W	988 feet (301 m)		Juneau	Juneau
Bartlett Lake	1420252	58°30′02″N 135°48′07″W	20 feet (6.1 m)			Hoonah-Angoon
Beach Lake	1398679	61°24′20″N 149°33′29″W	33 feet (10 m)		Anchorage	Anchorage
Bear Lake	1418197	56°00′20″N 160°14′07″W	121 feet (37 m)			Aleutians East
Bear Lake	1420308	60°12′03″N 149°21′11″W	285 feet (87 m)			Kenai Peninsula
Beaver Lake	1893570	63°38′30″N 152°31′30″W	814 feet (248 m)			Denali
Beaver Lake	1420341	57°40′34″N 134°12′15″W	341 feet (104 m)			Hoonah-Angoon
Beaverlog Lakes	1398815	63°59′27″N 151°48′46″W	646 feet (197 m)			Denali
Becharof Lake	1398817	57°57′08″N 156°22′36″W	13 feet (4.0 m)	453 square miles (290,000 acres)		Lake and Peninsula
Lake Beebe	1398827	61°17′44″N 149°47′56″W	102 feet (31 m)		Anchorage	Anchorage
Bentzen Lake	1416830	61°10′32″N 149°55′40″W	79 feet (24 m)		Anchorage	Anchorage
Berg Lake	1893597	58°55′00″N 135°45′00″W	2,720 feet (830 m)			Hoonah-Angoon
Bergh Lake	1398881	63°28′19″N 150°12′38″W	3,517 feet (1,072 m)			Denali
Big Lake	1418224	55°29′31″N 162°29′19″W	10 feet (3.0 m)			Aleutians East
Big Lake	1398982	63°31′12″N 152°31′17″W	850 feet (260 m)			Denali
Big Lake	1398979	61°31′39″N 149°54′08″W	144 feet (44 m)			Matanuska-Susitna
Big Lily Lake	1398993	63°57′16″N 151°42′52″W	646 feet (197 m)			Denali
Big Long Lake	1398994	63°31′23″N 152°26′47″W	974 feet (297 m)			Denali
Billberg Lake	1399025	63°54′23″N 151°49′55″W	669 feet (204 m)			Denali
Birch Lake	1893637	61°8′45″N 149°56′5″W	62 feet (19 m)		Anchorage	Anchorage
Birch Lake	1399070	64°18′54″N 146°39′42″W	823 feet (251 m)			Fairbanks North Star
Black Lake	1990135	59°30′12″N 135°15′40″W	768 feet (234 m)			Skagway
Blackfish Lake	1399175	63°36′25″N 152°39′51″W	837 feet (255 m)			Denali
Blair Lakes	1399182	64°21′32″N 147°21′52″W	843 feet (257 m)			Fairbanks North Star
Blinn Lake	1418246	55°15′10″N 162°45′02″W	95 feet (29 m)		Cold Bay	Aleutians East
Blue Bill Lake	1418248	55°15′07″N 162°48′26″W	10 feet (3.0 m)			Aleutians East
Blueberry Lake	1416816	61°9′45″N 149°54′35″W	82 feet (25 m)			Anchorage
Boundary Lake	1420598	58°35′32″N 133°43′06″W	804 feet (245 m)			Juneau
Brevig Lagoon	1399445	65°20′55″N 166°44′06″W	0 feet (0 m)			Nome
Buck Lake	1420699	57°43′39″N 134°08′22″W	341 feet (104 m)			Hoonah-Angoon
Burnt Lake	1399602	63°23′18″N 152°29′08″W	1,030 feet (310 m)			Denali
Byers Lake	1399640	62°44′23″N 150°06′40″W	758 feet (231 m)			Matanuska-Susitna
Camp Lake (Alaska)						
Campbell Lake	1419521	61°8′5″N 149°56′15″W	46 feet (14 m)			Anchorage
Little Campbell Lake	1412423	61°9′41″N 150°1′14″W	161 feet (49 m)			Anchorage
Carey Lake	1399952	63°24′31″N 152°36′07″W	942 feet (287 m)			Denali
Caribou Lake	1399982	63°33′14″N 152°27′07″W	860 feet (260 m)			Denali
Caribou Lake	1399983	64°52′44″N 147°45′47″W	456 feet (139 m)			Fairbanks North Star
Carls Cache Lake	1400000	63°33′13″N 152°32′40″W	846 feet (258 m)			Denali
Carlson Lake	1400008	63°48′20″N 151°54′31″W	673 feet (205 m)			Denali
Carmen Lake	1420886	60°54′24″N 148°46′0″W	144 feet (44 m)			Anchorage
Castle Rocks Lake	1400071	63°21′21″N 152°08′17″W	1,329 feet (405 m)			Denali
Cheney Lake	1416851	61°12′10″N 149°45′30″W	220 feet (67 m)			Anchorage
Chilchukabena Lake	1400286	63°54′31″N 151°30′14″W	627 feet (191 m)			Denali
Chilkat Lake	1421028	59°19′54″N 135°53′48″W	174 feet (53 m)			Haines
Chilkoot Lake	1421035	59°21′11″N 135°35′38″W	30 feet (9.1 m)			Haines
Chilok Lake	1893917	60°59′00″N 163°43′00″W	3 feet (0.91 m)			Kusilvak
Chisholm Lake	1400327	64°18′10″N 146°41′10″W	823 feet (251 m)			Fairbanks North Star
Christianson Lagoon	1418426	54°54′29″N 164°14′02″W	10 feet (3.0 m)			Aleutians East
Lake Clark (Alaska)	1400425	60°12′19″N 154°21′01″W	246 feet (75 m)	120 square miles (77,000 acres)		Lake and Peninsula Borough
Clear Lakes	1400459	63°29′47″N 162°12′02″W	59 feet (18 m)			Nome
Lake Clunie	1400502	61°21′16″N 149°36′34″W	174 feet (53 m)			Anchorage
Coast Lake	1418447	55°57′22″N 161°24′32″W	3 feet (0.91 m)			Aleutians East
Comma Lake	1893982	64°19′15″N 149°47′30″W	584 feet (178 m)			Denali
O'Connell Lake	1896024	61°11′36″N 149°52′45″W	102 feet (31 m)			Anchorage
Connolly Lake	1888886	59°25′39″N 135°39′28″W	2,270 feet (690 m)			Haines
Connors Lake	1400637	61°10′1″N 149°55′55″W	75 feet (23 m)			Anchorage
Coo Lake	1421183	57°42′17″N 134°18′04″W	633 feet (193 m)			Hoonah-Angoon
Coral Lake	1400687	63°49′38″N 160°45′28″W	7 feet (2.1 m)			Nome
Corner Lake	1400696	63°41′18″N 151°48′08″W	768 feet (234 m)			Denali
Crater Lake	1400777	58°07′54″N 133°47′44″W	1,024 feet (312 m)			Juneau
Crater Lake	1400781	64°57′55″N 165°15′57″W	984 feet (300 m)			Nome
Crescent Lake	1400796	58°12′34″N 133°21′32″W	194 feet (59 m)			Juneau
Crillon Lake	1421281	58°34′02″N 137°22′32″W	328 feet (100 m)			Hoonah-Angoon
Cropley Lake	1400849	58°15′49″N 134°31′29″W	1,814 feet (553 m)			Juneau
Crystal Lake	1400881	61°3′7″N 149°7′18″W	3,455 feet (1,053 m)			Anchorage
Dall Lake	1400950	60°14′56″N 163°33′19″W	13 feet (4.0 m)			Bethel CA
Davidson Lake	1421369	57°37′22″N 134°21′17″W	312 feet (95 m)			Hoonah-Angoon
North Deception Lake	1407154	58°23′41″N 136°46′36″W	75 feet (23 m)			Hoonah-Angoon
South Deception Lake	1409910	58°21′54″N 136°46′44″W	115 feet (35 m)			Hoonah-Angoon
Delaney Lake	1416828	61°10′30″N 149°54′58″W	82 feet (25 m)			Anchorage
DeLong Lake	1401018	61°9′47″N 149°57′22″W	75 feet (23 m)			Anchorage
Deneki Lakes	1401119	63°36′39″N 148°46′52″W	2,139 feet (652 m)			Denali
Devil Mountain Lakes	1418492	66°23′58″N 164°29′12″W	82 feet (25 m)			Nome
Devils Punch Bowl	1421448	59°25′46″N 135°16′47″W	3,550 feet (1,080 m)			Skagway
Lower Dewey Lake	1423443	59°26′40″N 135°18′40″W	489 feet (149 m)			Skagway
Upper Dewey Lake	1415510	59°26′35″N 135°15′57″W	3,113 feet (949 m)			Skagway
Dishno Pond	1416839	61°14′8″N 149°38′52″W	443 feet (135 m)			Anchorage
Distin Lake	1421476	57°38′01″N 134°22′47″W	312 feet (95 m)			Hoonah-Angoon
Divide Lake	1418496	55°32′07″N 161°54′41″W	804 feet (245 m)			Aleutians East
Divide Lake	1421485	60°45′58″N 148°45′24″W	594 feet (181 m)			Anchorage
Lower Doame Lake	1423444	59°08′38″N 138°09′15″W	197 feet (60 m)			Yakutat
Upper Doame Lake	1415511	59°06′11″N 138°07′48″W	1,558 feet (475 m)			Yakutat
Doe Lake	1421493	57°43′22″N 134°08′59″W	630 feet (190 m)			Hoonah-Angoon
Lake Dorothy	1401361	58°13′59″N 133°58′05″W	2,425 feet (739 m)			Juneau
Drashner Lake	1401390	63°22′17″N 148°50′11″W	2,267 feet (691 m)			Denali
Dredge Lake	1401394	58°24′02″N 134°33′31″W	69 feet (21 m)			Juneau
Dull Ax Lake	1401472	63.3445394°N 152.7133273°W	938 feet (286 m)			Yukon–Koyukuk Census Area
Eagle Lake	1401538	61°10′35″N 149°21′53″W	2,549 feet (777 m)			Anchorage
Edes Lake	1401655	63°19′37″N 149°05′56″W	2,306 feet (703 m)			Denali, Matanuska-Susitna
Edmonds Lake	1401663	61°25′58″N 149°23′23″W	302 feet (92 m)			Anchorage
Eightmile Lake	1401715	63°53′24″N 149°15′09″W	2,126 feet (648 m)			Denali
Lake Elfendahl	1421703	57°50′57″N 136°17′52″W	259 feet (79 m)			Hoonah-Angoon
Eklutna Lake	1401730	61°22′51″N 149°02′42″W	840 feet (260 m)	5.5 square miles (3,500 acres)	Anchorage	Anchorage
Eliza Lake	1421705	57°11′16″N 134°20′14″W	246 feet (75 m)			Hoonah-Angoon
Emmons Lake	1418556	55°18′58″N 162°05′56″W	1,194 feet (364 m)			Aleutians East
Endicott Lake	1421744	58°49′35″N 135°40′34″W	906 feet (276 m)			Haines
Engineer Lake	1401849	61°44′09″N 161°47′44″W	0 feet (0 m)			Kusilvak
Evelyn Lake	1894292	58°52′00″N 134°55′00″W	59 feet (18 m)			Juneau
Lower Fire Lake	1405755	61°21′19″N 149°32′39″W	299 feet (91 m)			Anchorage
Upper Fire Lake	1411562	61°21′10″N 149°31′46″W	472 feet (144 m)			Anchorage
Big Fish Lake	1418220	55°46′29″N 161°46′21″W	89 feet (27 m)			Aleutians East
Fish Lake	1402115	61°16′26″N 149°48′29″W	289 feet (88 m)			Anchorage
Fish Lake	1402129	63°32′42″N 152°29′59″W	846 feet (258 m)			Denali
Fish Lake	1421941	58°39′12″N 137°37′52″W	36 feet (11 m)			Hoonah-Angoon
Flat Horn Lake	1402196	61°27′51″N 150°25′16″W	26 feet (7.9 m)			Matanuska-Susitna
Flora Lake	1402221	63°29′04″N 170°07′17″W	66 feet (20 m)			Nome
Lake Florence	1421988	57°48′22″N 134°37′19″W	135 feet (41 m)			Hoonah-Angoon
Foraker Pond	1402263	63°42′43″N 152°11′51″W	745 feet (227 m)			Denali
Fox Lake	1422037	64°31′17″N 164°58′02″W	7 feet (2.1 m)			Nome
Franks Lagoon	1418612	56°03′07″N 160°30′06″W	3 feet (0.91 m)			Aleutians East
Fresh Water Lake	1422057	57°34′04″N 134°25′23″W	26 feet (7.9 m)			Hoonah-Angoon
Laguna de la Frezas	1894445	59°33′00″N 139°50′00″W	16 feet (4.9 m)			Yakutat
Laguna de la Frezas	1894446	59°33′12″N 139°49′32″W	23 feet (7.0 m)			Yakutat
Inner Lake George	1403868	61°17′21″N 148°32′15″W	348 feet (106 m)			Anchorage
Lake George	1894489	61°15′0″N 148°37′0″W	348 feet (106 m)			Anchorage
Lower Lake George	1405758	61°19′18″N 148°29′50″W	348 feet (106 m)			Anchorage
Upper Lake George	1411566	61°14′40″N 148°38′7″W	351 feet (107 m)			Anchorage
Lake Gilbert	1894498	55°08′00″N 163°14′00″W	23 feet (7.0 m)			Aleutians East
Glacial Lake	1402589	64°51′50″N 165°42′08″W	394 feet (120 m)			Nome
Glenn Lake	1402649	61°3′10″N 148°46′19″W	2,539 feet (774 m)			Anchorage
Glory Lake	1402656	58°23′29″N 134°08′14″W	358 feet (109 m)			Juneau
Goat Lake	1422195	59°32′3″N 135°10′27″W	2,913 feet (888 m)			Skagway
Goldstream Lakes	1416422	64°56′28″N 147°41′08″W	699 feet (213 m)			Fairbanks North Star
Goose Lake (Anchorage, Alaska)	1402795	61°11′42″N 149°49′2″W	141 feet (43 m)			Anchorage
Goose Lake (Hoonah-Angoon CA, Alaska)	1422228	57°55′09″N 136°13′47″W	1,850 feet (560 m)			Hoonah-Angoon
Gosling Lake	1402493	63°54′03″N 151°52′32″W	659 feet (201 m)			Denali
Grassy Lake	1412419	63°50′08″N 160°43′42″W	26 feet (7.9 m)			Nome
Grassy Pond	1894582	58°34′40″N 137°24′10″W	1,158 feet (353 m)			Hoonah-Angoon
Green Lake	1402958	61°16′46″N 149°50′10″W	92 feet (28 m)			Anchorage
Green Lake (Alaska)	1422323	56°58′49″N 135°3′56″W	361 feet (110 m)			Sitka
Grizzly Lake	1402999	63°02′22″N 152°29′57″W	1,768 feet (539 m)			Denali
Lake Grouse	1422344	60°12′04″N 149°22′30″W	312 feet (95 m)			Kenai Peninsula
Lake Guerin	1422351	57°39′15″N 134°18′52″W	312 feet (95 m)			Hoonah-Angoon
Gwenn Lake	1403084	61°17′55″N 149°40′32″W	33 feet (10 m)			Anchorage
Halfmoon Lake	1422407	56°1′58″N 131°45′35″W	791 feet (241 m)			Ketchikan Gateway
Harding Lake	1403177	64°25′29″N 146°51′14″W	715 feet (218 m)			Fairbanks North Star
Harlequin Lake	1422454	59°26′16″N 138°56′33″W	82 feet (25 m)			Yakutat
Harlequinn Lake	1419552	59°24′40″N 139°01′20″W	115 feet (35 m)			Yakutat
Hartman Lake	1403214	64°25′41″N 146°54′15″W	696 feet (212 m)			Fairbanks North Star
Hasselborg Lake	1422478	57°42′47″N 134°17′17″W	299 feet (91 m)			Hoonah-Angoon
Herman Lake	1422547	59°24′41″N 136°8′55″W	974 feet (297 m)			Haines
Lake Hess	1418679	55°16′53″N 162°46′33″W	26 feet (7.9 m)			Aleutians East
Hidden Lake	1413131	60°29′8″N 150°16′0″W	282 feet (86 m)	2.63 square miles (1,687 acres)		Kenai Peninsula
Lake Hideaway	1403364	61°7′23″N 149°44′24″W	866 feet (264 m)			Anchorage
High Lake	1403372	62°50′56″N 149°7′35″W	2,359 feet (719 m)			Matanuska-Susitna
Hoktaheen Lake	1403425	58°03′14″N 136°30′27″W	167 feet (51 m)			Hoonah-Angoon
Lake Hood	1403475	61°10′57″N 149°58′19″W	69 feet (21 m)			Anchorage
Hoodoo Lake	1894731	55°41′00″N 161°03′00″W	259 feet (79 m)			Aleutians East
Horseshoe Lake	1403532	63°44′28″N 148°54′37″W	1,565 feet (477 m)			Denali
Icefall Lake	1847231	57°53′19″N 133°28′35″W	1,473 feet (449 m)			Hoonah-Angoon
Icy Lake	1422721	59°27′51″N 135°17′15″W	925 feet (282 m)			Skagway
Iliamna Lake	1403764	59°32′12″N 155°01′28″W	46 feet (14 m)	1,014 square miles (649,000 acres)		Lake and Peninsula
Ilnik Lake	1403774	56°34′05″N 159°42′03″W	0 feet (0 m)			Aleutians East
Imiaknikpak Lake	1403779	68°28′44″N 154°3′12″W	1,627 feet (496 m)			North Slope
Imuruk Lake	1403789	65°07′14″N 165°42′00″W	7 feet (2.1 m)			Nome
Independence Lake	1422732	58°53′19″N 135°08′08″W	157 feet (48 m)			Juneau
Indian Lake	1403825	58°10′48″N 133°39′16″W	177 feet (54 m)			Juneau
Indigo Lake	1422750	57°0′48″N 135°4′0″W	2,480 feet (760 m)			Sitka
Iniakuk Lake	1403860	67°8′4″N 153°13′32″W	709 feet (216 m)			Yukon–Koyukuk CA
Islet Lake	1422792	57°39′11″N 134°10′40″W	364 feet (111 m)			Hoonah-Angoon
Italio Lake	1422796	59°22′30″N 138°54′00″W	151 feet (46 m)			Yakutat
Jewel Lake	1404121	61°8′26″N 149°57′42″W	92 feet (28 m)			Anchorage
Jims Lake	1422849	57°34′04″N 134°16′04″W	233 feet (71 m)			Hoonah-Angoon
John Hansen Lake	1404164	64°01′50″N 151°09′35″W	515 feet (157 m)			Denali
Johnny Lake	1418746	55°15′28″N 162°45′37″W	98 feet (30 m)			Aleutians East
Johnson Lake	1413239	60°17′25″N 151°15′54″W	135 feet (41 m)			Kenai
Johnson Lake	1422876	60°36′11″N 149°15′11″W	1,362 feet (415 m)			Kenai
Jones Lake	1416834	61°11′30″N 149°57′55″W	56 feet (17 m)			Anchorage
Kagankaguti Lake	1404301	61°43′18″N 165°17′24″W	10 feet (3.0 m)			Kusilvak
Kako Lake	1404343	61°51′26″N 161°20′43″W	26 feet (7.9 m)			Kusilvak
Kanalku Lake	1422942	57°29′13″N 134°21′01″W	92 feet (28 m)			Hoonah-Angoon
Kapsukalik Lake	1404452	63°28′00″N 170°10′37″W	82 feet (25 m)			Nome
Kardy Lake	1422949	59°31′52″N 139°49′17″W	20 feet (6.1 m)			Yakutat
Lake Kathleen	1422988	57°54′42″N 134°40′07″W	476 feet (145 m)			Hoonah-Angoon
Kawialik Lake	1404530	61°43′50″N 165°10′41″W	10 feet (3.0 m)			Kusilvak
Kgun Lake	1404617	61°32′55″N 163°44′36″W	7 feet (2.1 m)			Kusilvak
Lake Killarney	1404688	64°52′14″N 147°53′56″W	531 feet (162 m)			Fairbanks North Star
Kiloknak Lagoon	1404697	63°10′15″N 168°49′36″W	0 feet (0 m)			Nome
Kingaglia Lake	1404748	61°35′09″N 163°36′35″W	26 feet (7.9 m)			Kusilvak
Kingokakthluk Lake	1404758	61°44′50″N 165°06′46″W	13 feet (4.0 m)			Kusilvak
Lake Kiowa	1404777	61°17′54″N 149°40′12″W	36 feet (11 m)			Anchorage
Knutson Lake	1418804	55°37′32″N 161°13′15″W	2,710 feet (830 m)			Aleutians East
Kontrashibuna Lake	1404943	60°11′43″N 154°3′56″W	440 feet (130 m)			Lake and Peninsula Borough
Kornui Lake	1404957	60°11′43″N 154°3′56″W	2,044 feet (623 m)			Yukon–Koyukuk
Kuzitrin Lake	1405110	65°23′07″N 163°12′55″W	1,424 feet (434 m)			Nome
Lazy Lake	1397695	61°15′0″N 149°49′0″W	174 feet (53 m)			Anchorage
Lieuy Lake	1405324	58°14′36″N 134°00′02″W	1,768 feet (539 m)			Juneau
Lily Lake	1423300	59°12′24″N 135°23′23″W	741 feet (226 m)			Haines
Little Lagoon	1418859	55°03′26″N 163°13′22″W	20 feet (6.1 m)			Aleutians East
Little Lagoon	1423356	57°17′33″N 133°19′24″W	39 feet (12 m)			Hoonah-Angoon
Little Lake	1405481	62°57′43″N 152°11′13″W	2,349 feet (716 m)			Denali
Little Lake	1405482	64°24′41″N 146°54′01″W	722 feet (220 m)			Fairbanks North Star
Little Long Lake	1405485	63°30′01″N 152°27′00″W	1,050 feet (320 m)			Denali
Live Trap Lake	1405578	63°31′26″N 152°04′11″W	1,007 feet (307 m)			Denali
Liwa Lake	1397670	64°52′46″N 147°35′18″W	610 feet (190 m)			Fairbanks North Star
Long Lake	1405645	63°32′42″N 152°38′34″W	840 feet (260 m)			Denali
Long Lake	1405633	58°11′17″N 133°45′56″W	814 feet (248 m)			Juneau
Loon Lakes	1405686	58°25′44″N 134°05′58″W	712 feet (217 m)			Juneau
Lopp Lagoon	1405690	65°43′10″N 167°45′52″W	0 feet (0 m)			Nome
Lost Lake	1416666	59°31′0″N 135°22′42″W	1,355 feet (413 m)			Skagway
Luebner Lake	1423473	60°45′29″N 148°59′15″W	39 feet (12 m)			Anchorage
Main Lake	1895541	58°50′00″N 135°45′30″W	584 feet (178 m)			Hoonah-Angoon
Maknik Lagoon	1405891	63°11′13″N 169°09′16″W	0 feet (0 m)			Nome
Malaspina Lake	1868017	59°48′00″N 140°10′00″W	33 feet (10 m)			Yakutat
Marys Lake	1406023	65°12′51″N 165°15′30″W	7 feet (2.1 m)			Nome
McKinney Lake	1423627	57°40′22″N 134°18′39″W	374 feet (114 m)			Hoonah-Angoon
McLeod Lake	1406167	63°22′24″N 151°05′21″W	1,880 feet (570 m)			Denali
Meadow Lake	[1406190]	61°10′3″N 149°57′40″W	85 feet (26 m)			Anchorage
Medvejie Lake	1423644	57°1′23″N 135°7′9″W	243 feet (74 m)			Sitka
Mendenhall Lake	1406232	58°25′24″N 134°34′10″W	52 feet (16 m)			Juneau
Middle Lake	1406311	64°52′59″N 147°45′56″W	482 feet (147 m)			Fairbanks North Star
Miles Lake (Alaska)	1423704	60°40′53″N 144°40′3″W	125 feet (38 m)			Valdez-Cordova
Mingvk Lake	1406394	65°24′30″N 164°33′15″W	289 feet (88 m)			Nome
Minor Lake	1406415	61°25′34″N 149°24′52″W	315 feet (96 m)			Anchorage
Mirror Lake	1416865	61°25′32″N 149°24′52″W	325 feet (99 m)			Anchorage
Mirror Lake	1406427	63°20′08″N 149°05′56″W	2,306 feet (703 m)			Denali, Matanuska-Susitna
Mirror Lake	1416602	61°32′2″N 149°59′01″W	148 feet (45 m)			Matanuska-Susitna
Mirror Lake	1423738	55°31′2″N 131°9′11″W	377 feet (115 m)			Ketchikan Gateway
Mirror Lake	1416248	52°54′41″N 173°13′16″W	0 feet (0 m)			Aleutians West CA
Mirror Lake	1406426	59°14′10″N 154°45′37″W	1,299 feet (396 m)			Lake and Peninsula
Monterey Lake	1397676	64°49′17″N 147°37′12″W	446 feet (136 m)			Fairbanks North Star
Moon Lake	1406529	63°22′42″N 143°33′4″W	1,516 feet (462 m)			Southeast Fairbanks CA
Moon Lake	1406530	66°7′4″N 148°56′3″W	308 feet (94 m)			Yukon-Koyukuk CA
Moon Lake	1895745	63°23′0″N 143°23′0″W	1,539 feet (469 m)			Southeast Fairbanks CA
Moon Lake	1413548	60°52′47″N 150°21′56″W	184 feet (56 m)			Kenai Peninsula
Moose Lake	1406594	63°35′13″N 152°41′33″W	833 feet (254 m)			Denali
Mosquito Lake	1423799	59°27′48″N 136°1′22″W	148 feet (45 m)			Haines
Mother Goose Lake	1406641	57°12′16″N 157°19′33″W	75 feet (23 m)			Lake and Peninsula
Mountain Lake	1423812	59°39′43″N 139°20′56″W	187 feet (57 m)			Yakutat
Mucha Lake	1406661	64°12′44″N 150°54′25″W	604 feet (184 m)			Denali
Mud Lake	1416641	61°35′55″N 149°30′0″W	443 feet (135 m)			Matanuska-Susitna
Mud Lake	1406676	62°18′51″N 146°43′19″W	2,415 feet (736 m)			Matanuska-Susitna
Mud Lake	1406677	66°49′55″N 143°31′46″W	551 feet (168 m)			Yukon–Koyukuk CA
Mud Lake	1406675	62°7′47″N 145°55′52″W	2,113 feet (644 m)			Valdez–Cordova CA
Mud Lake	1416924	61°35′49″N 149°20′42″W	328 feet (100 m)			Matanuska-Susitna
Mud Lake	1406678	68°6′27″N 145°32′27″W	2,044 feet (623 m)			Yukon–Koyukuk CA
Mud Lakes	1406679	66°18′28″N 147°4′56″W	358 feet (109 m)			Yukon–Koyukuk CA
Naknek Lake	1406799	58°37′49″N 155°54′17″W	33 feet (10 m)	242 square miles (155,000 acres)		Lake and Peninsula
Nanvaranak Choa	1406821	61°36′07″N 164°43′01″W	7 feet (2.1 m)			Kusilvak
Nanvaranak Lake	1406822	62°38′49″N 163°33′37″W	10 feet (3.0 m)			Kusilvak
Nanvaranak Lake	1895821	61°35′00″N 164°45′00″W	26 feet (7.9 m)			Kusilvak
Nashak Lake	1895833	61°26′00″N 164°48′00″W	13 feet (4.0 m)			Kusilvak
Ninivahut Lake	1895900	63°44′00″N 171°43′00″W	0 feet (0 m)			Nome
Niykhapakhit Lake	1407089	63°10′43″N 169°43′47″W	66 feet (20 m)			Nome
Niyrakpak Lagoon	1407090	63°37′30″N 171°26′52″W	0 feet (0 m)			Nome
Nuigalak Lake	1407309	61°31′38″N 164°38′35″W	13 feet (4.0 m)			Kusilvak
Nunavakanuk Lake	1407345	62°03′33″N 164°38′51″W	0 feet (0 m)			Kusilvak
Lake Nunavaugaluk	1397829	59°19′13.47″N 159°03′01.42″W	33 feet (10 m)			Dillingham
Nunvotchuk Lake	1407356	61°46′48″N 161°20′07″W	30 feet (9.1 m)			Kusilvak
Nuskealik Lake	1407366	61°27′53″N 164°26′46″W	7 feet (2.1 m)			Kusilvak
Nuwuk Lake	1407375	71°23′17″N 156°28′29″W	10 feet (3.0 m)			North Slope
Ocolaksuk Lake	1407416	61°48′16″N 161°21′30″W	30 feet (9.1 m)			Kusilvak
Oily Lake	1407441	60°07′15″N 140°40′40″W	1,335 feet (407 m)			Yakutat
Old Cache Lake	1407473	63°35′41″N 152°20′10″W	873 feet (266 m)			Denali
Lake Omiaktalik	1407544	65°12′16″N 165°16′15″W	7 feet (2.1 m)			Nome
Omiaktalik Lake	1896058	65°12′00″N 163°16′00″W	2,411 feet (735 m)			Nome
Ongoveyuk Lagoon	1407558	63°25′45″N 169°48′11″W	0 feet (0 m)			Nome
Onolavik Lake	1407564	61°49′18″N 161°22′58″W	30 feet (9.1 m)			Kusilvak
Oona Lake	1407573	58°25′45″N 134°07′48″W	1,168 feet (356 m)			Juneau
Lake Otis	1407635	61°11′30″N 149°50′31″W	128 feet (39 m)			Anchorage
Otter Lake	1407652	61°17′24″N 149°44′12″W	92 feet (28 m)			Anchorage
Otter Lake	1407654	63°32′17″N 152°33′12″W	846 feet (258 m)			Denali
Otter Lake	1407650	58°08′04″N 135°52′58″W	151 feet (46 m)			Hoonah-Angoon
Otto Lake	1407659	63°50′29″N 149°02′09″W	1,798 feet (548 m)			Denali
Paradise Lake	1990007	59°15′05″N 135°18′48″W	1,877 feet (572 m)			Hoonah-Angoon
Partway Lake	1896124	61°38′00″N 163°28′00″W	16 feet (4.9 m)			Kusilvak
Pavlof Lake	1424186	57°50′39″N 135°02′53″W	3 feet (0.91 m)			Hoonah-Angoon
Lake Paul	1407825	64°53′10″N 147°45′44″W	489 feet (149 m)			Fairbanks North Star
Peanut Lake	1424191	57°55′07″N 134°42′43″W	295 feet (90 m)			Hoonah-Angoon
Peterson Lagoon	1419038	54°55′51″N 164°11′22″W	0 feet (0 m)			Aleutians East
Peterson Lake	1407926	58°26′26″N 134°43′56″W	715 feet (218 m)			Juneau
Pine Lake	1424266	57°39′22″N 134°11′30″W	338 feet (103 m)			Hoonah-Angoon
Placer Lakes	1424291	57°31′54″N 133°13′36″W	3,281 feet (1,000 m)			Hoonah-Angoon
Pleasant Bay Lake	1424297	57°36′27″N 134°01′24″W	138 feet (42 m)			Hoonah-Angoon
Portage Lake	1424615	60°46′32″N 148°48′56″W	118 feet (36 m)			Anchorage
Psalm Lake	1408330	61°22′59″N 149°33′45″W	226 feet (69 m)			Anchorage
Ptarmigan Lake	1408351	63°59′16″N 148°35′39″W	3,182 feet (970 m)			Denali
Pump House Lake	1990136	59°37′22″N 135°8′10″W	3,018 feet (920 m)			Skagway
Puyuk Lake	1416734	63°30′12″N 162°12′30″W	52 feet (16 m)			Nome
Pybus Lake	1424694	57°26′07″N 134°12′03″W	358 feet (109 m)			Hoonah-Angoon
Lake Redfield	1424772	59°39′13″N 139°30′22″W	144 feet (44 m)			Yakutat
Redoubt Lake	1424779	56°53′17″N 135°15′2″W	0 feet (0 m)			Sitka
Reindeer Lake	1408647	64°53′03″N 147°46′01″W	489 feet (149 m)			Fairbanks North Star
Rescue Lake	1419124	55°15′25″N 162°49′43″W	7 feet (2.1 m)			Aleutians East
Rocky Lake	1896401	59°31′10″N 139°47′20″W	13 feet (4.0 m)			Yakutat
Round Lake	1413886	60°19′14″N 150°32′41″W	791 feet (241 m)			Kenai Peninsula
Rustabach Lake	1414380	59°7′54″N 135°20′11″W	292 feet (89 m)			Haines
Ryan Lake	1416001	63°51′10″N 160°43′30″W	30 feet (9.1 m)			Nome
Salmon Lake	1412410	64°54′10″N 165°00′31″W	440 feet (130 m)			Nome
Salt Chuck	1414445	57°21′04″N 133°04′43″W	0 feet (0 m)			Hoonah-Angoon
The Salt Chuck	1415257	57°26′57″N 133°19′40″W	0 feet (0 m)			Hoonah-Angoon
Salt Lake	1414452	57°34′19″N 134°22′15″W	20 feet (6.1 m)			Hoonah-Angoon
Salt Lake	1409031	58°29′43″N 134°46′50″W	39 feet (12 m)			Juneau
Salt Water Lagoon	1419168	55°54′37″N 161°40′01″W	3 feet (0.91 m)			Aleutians East
Sand Lake	1409062	61°9′6″N 149°57′50″W	92 feet (28 m)			Anchorage
Sandless Lake	1409066	63°57′46″N 150°40′56″W	554 feet (169 m)			Denali
Sandy Lake	1419187	56°09′17″N 159°57′03″W	203 feet (62 m)			Aleutians East
Sapsuk Lake	1419191	55°41′25″N 161°02′36″W	259 feet (79 m)			Aleutians East
Scotty Lake	1409168	62°19′27″N 150°19′10″W	479 feet (146 m)			Matanuska-Susitna
Scotty Lake	1409169	62°55′21″N 152°30′18″W	2,037 feet (621 m)			Denali
Scotty Lake	1409170	66°49′7″N 143°29′55″W	554 feet (169 m)			Yukon-Koyukuk CA
Lake Seclusion	1414574	58°32′22″N 136°21′53″W	79 feet (24 m)			Hoonah-Angoon
Seepanpak Lagoon	1409223	63°18′25″N 169°09′03″W	0 feet (0 m)			Nome
Selawik Lake	1413932	66°29′39″N 160°41′27″W	0 feet (0 m)	404 square miles (259,000 acres)		Northwest Arctic
Shelter Lake	1409418	58°25′04″N 134°52′01″W	187 feet (57 m)			Juneau
Shishkof Pond	1419237	54°47′36″N 164°34′54″W	20 feet (6.1 m)			Aleutians East
Sikady Lake	1414707	57°43′32″N 134°20′24″W	640 feet (200 m)			Hoonah-Angoon
Simeon Lake	1419242	55°14′39″N 162°46′47″W	69 feet (21 m)			Aleutians East
Situk Lake	1414749	59°38′31″N 139°23′56″W	138 feet (42 m)			Yakutat
Sivneghak Lagoon	1409631	63°16′04″N 168°43′46″W	0 feet (0 m)			Nome
Six Mile Lake (Alaska)	1409649	59°58′54″N 154°48′22″W	243 feet (74 m)			Lake and Peninsula
Skilak Lake	1414005	60°25′23″N 150°20′56″W	190 feet (58 m)			Kenai Peninsula
Slide Lake	1409752	58°00′11″N 134°24′08″W	597 feet (182 m)			Hoonah-Angoon
Smith Lake	1409790	64°51′57″N 147°51′50″W	509 feet (155 m)			Fairbanks North Star
Spectacle Lake	1409999	63°34′53″N 152°23′08″W	869 feet (265 m)			Denali
Speel Lake (historical)	1410003	58°20′45″N 133°26′04″W	1,450 feet (440 m)			Juneau
Lake Spenard	1410008	61°10′44″N 149°56′52″W	69 feet (21 m)			Anchorage
Spring Lake	1410044	61°17′3″N 149°49′7″W	112 feet (34 m)			Anchorage
Sprucefish Lake	1410067	63°34′20″N 152°42′43″W	830 feet (250 m)			Denali
Square Lake	1414954	59°14′12″N 138°43′04″W	46 feet (14 m)			Yakutat
Star Lake	1410131	64°52′52″N 147°45′49″W	472 feet (144 m)			Fairbanks North Star
Starr Lake	1410137	63°56′51″N 151°39′43″W	643 feet (196 m)			Denali
Stormy Lake	1414067	60°46′51″N 151°03′09″W	50 feet (15 m)			Kenai Peninsula Borough
Strawberry Lake	1416818	61°9′10″N 149°54′32″W	75 feet (23 m)			Anchorage
Summit Lake	1415079	59°37′21″N 135°8′9″W	3,018 feet (920 m)			Skagway
Summit Lake	1415078	59°30′40″N 139°45′36″W	10 feet (3.0 m)			Yakutat
Summit Lakes	1416460	59°30′51″N 139°46′05″W	10 feet (3.0 m)			Yakutat
Sundi Lake	1410366	61°8′48″N 149°57′55″W	85 feet (26 m)			Anchorage
Surge Lake	1410414	58°00′26″N 136°30′25″W	20 feet (6.1 m)			Hoonah-Angoon
Swan Lake	1414094	60°23′30″N 150°24′28″W	243 feet (74 m)			Kenai Peninsula
Swan Lake	1415126	60°37′12″N 149°51′13″W	1,378 feet (420 m)			Kenai Peninsula
Swan Lake (Alaska)	1415125	57°3′32″N 135°20′46″W	46 feet (14 m)			Sitka
Swan Lake	1410470	62°31′24″N 150°23′47″W	643 feet (196 m)			Matanuska-Susitna
Swan Lake	1414095	60°40′20″N 150°32′30″W	187 feet (57 m)			Kenai Peninsula
Swan Lake	1410469	61°31′37″N 148°54′8″W	56 feet (17 m)			Matanuska-Susitna
Swan Lake	1410471	63°11′46″N 142°19′4″W	1,650 feet (500 m)			Southeast Fairbanks CA
Swan Lake	1410472	68°13′47″N 145°21′19″W	2,047 feet (624 m)			Yukon-Koyukuk CA
Swan Lake	1415124	57°1′57″N 132°42′57″W	1,509 feet (460 m)			Petersburg
Swan Lake	1415123	55°36′59″N 131°17′13″W	302 feet (92 m)			Ketchikan Gateway
Lower Sweetheart Lake	1423453	57°58′16″N 133°35′16″W	545 feet (166 m)			Juneau
Upper Sweetheart Lake	1411578	57°59′48″N 133°29′34″W	2,116 feet (645 m)			Juneau
Swineford Lakes	1410507	58°27′24″N 133°46′24″W	1,109 feet (338 m)			Juneau
Symphony Lake	1410517	61°10′26″N 149°22′50″W	2,648 feet (807 m)			Anchorage
Taiga Lake	1414101	60°54′42″N 150°27′2″W	187 feet (57 m)			Kenai Peninsula
Takanis Lake	1415161	57°57′31″N 136°27′15″W	253 feet (77 m)			Hoonah-Angoon
Taku Lake	1410577	58°05′30″N 134°01′31″W	223 feet (68 m)			Juneau
Tanis Lake	1415185	59°16′38″N 138°32′00″W	194 feet (59 m)			Yakutat
Tarheel Lagoon	1419340	54°39′39″N 164°42′33″W	3 feet (0.91 m)			Aleutians East
Taylor Lagoon	1410688	64°34′01″N 164°07′32″W	13 feet (4.0 m)			Nome
Taylor Lake	1415205	57°36′16″N 133°23′22″W	213 feet (65 m)			Hoonah-Angoon
Tazlina Lake	1410696	61°53′7″N 146°29′4″W	1,785 feet (544 m)			Valdez-Cordova
Teardrop Lake	1410701	58°21′20″N 135°11′38″W	1,535 feet (468 m)			Haines
Tease Lake	1410702	58°06′23″N 133°39′38″W	1,010 feet (310 m)			Juneau
Tern Lake	1415220	60°31′53″N 149°32′44″W	620 feet (190 m)			Kenai Peninsula
Teshekpuk Lake	1410764	70°34′17″N 153°30′51″W	7 feet (2.1 m)	320 square miles (200,000 acres)		North Slope
Thayer Lake	1415227	57°39′32″N 134°28′07″W	367 feet (112 m)			Hoonah-Angoon
Thinpoint Lake	1419354	55°01′35″N 162°38′00″W	7 feet (2.1 m)			Aleutians East
Tina Lake	1410980	61°10′1″N 149°53′21″W	112 feet (34 m)			Anchorage
Togiak Lake	1411041	59°38′2″N 159°36′28″W	220 feet (67 m)			Dillingham
Little Togiak Lake	1405556	59°34′32″N 159°8′58″W	39 feet (12 m)			Dillingham
Upper Togiak Lake	1411583	59°50′13″N 159°28′34″W	302 feet (92 m)			Dillingham
West Togiak Lake	1411921	59°38′37″N 159°38′22″W	230 feet (70 m)			Dillingham
Tomname Lagoon	1411092	63°21′04″N 169°30′56″W	0 feet (0 m)			Nome
Totuck Lake	1416735	61°38′06″N 169°36′46″W	374 feet (114 m)			Matanuska-Susitna
Trapper Lake	1411187	61°59′46″N 150°14′35″W	174 feet (53 m)			Matanuska-Susitna
Trapper Joe Lake	1414159	60°45′38″N 150°4′42″W	289 feet (88 m)			Kenai Peninsula
Lake Trelford	1419379	55°16′14″N 162°46′02″W	39 feet (12 m)			Aleutians East
Triangle Lake	1411206	61°16′16″N 149°48′39″W	285 feet (87 m)			Anchorage
Triangle Lake	1415407	59°17′38″N 138°56′11″W	43 feet (13 m)			Yakutat
North Trick Lake	1407241	58°22′19″N 136°42′53″W	190 feet (58 m)			Hoonah-Angoon
South Trick Lake	1409972	58°21′36″N 136°42′06″W	197 feet (60 m)			Hoonah-Angoon
Triple Lakes	1411227	63°39′31″N 148°52′26″W	2,080 feet (630 m)			Denali
Troutman Lake	1411245	63°45′47″N 171°43′42″W	0 feet (0 m)			Nome
Tungak Lake	1877271	61°25′40″N 164°11′30″W	79 feet (24 m)			Kusilvak
Tuomi Lake	1411332	61°16′32″N 149°49′25″W	125 feet (38 m)			Anchorage
Turner Lake	1411351	58°18′50″N 133°50′58″W	72 feet (22 m)			Juneau
Tustumena Lake	1414188	60°11′1″N 150°52′15″W	112 feet (34 m)	94 square miles (60,000 acres)		Kenai Peninsula
Twin Glacier Lake	1415468	58°32′34″N 133°53′56″W	30 feet (9.1 m)			Juneau
Twin Lakes (Alaska)						
Twin Lakes	1897113	64°35′00″N 165°15′00″W	49 feet (15 m)			Nome
Ugashik Lakes						
University Lake	1416587	61°11′13″N 149°47′55″W	164 feet (50 m)			Anchorage
Ustay Lake	1415529	59°18′02″N 138°42′20″W	161 feet (49 m)			Yakutat
Vitus Lake						
Vivid Lake	1415577	58°50′31″N 136°27′22″W	43 feet (13 m)			Hoonah-Angoon
Waldron Lake	1416812	61°10′43″N 149°50′50″W	128 feet (39 m)			Anchorage
Walker Lake (Northwest Arctic, Alaska)	1414240	67°7′36″N 154°21′47″W	679 feet (207 m)			Northwest Arctic
Walker Lake	1415603	59°23′43″N 136°8′39″W	1,181 feet (360 m)			Haines
Ward Lake	1415615	55°24′43″N 131°42′00″W	52 feet (16 m)	0.054 mi^{2} (34.6 ac)		Ketchikan Gateway
White Fish Lake	1411982	66°22′45″N 164°44′45″W	39 feet (12 m)			Nome
Wild Lake	1412048	67°30′08″N 151°30′17″W	1,122 feet (342 m)			Yukon–Koyukuk Census Area
Windfall Lake	1415790	58°30′25″N 134°43′24″W	59 feet (18 m)			Juneau
Wonder Lake	1412242	63°28′27″N 150°52′33″W	1,985 feet (605 m)			Denali
Wood Lake	1415827	58°33′05″N 136°29′29″W	75 feet (23 m)			Hoonah-Angoon
Yoder Lake	1412346	63°37′51″N 152°40′42″W	840 feet (260 m)			Denali
Young Lake	1412365	58°07′30″N 134°28′40″W	338 feet (103 m)			Hoonah-Angoon
Zagoskin Lake	1416739	63°26′56″N 162°06′25″W	16 feet (4.9 m)			Nome
Zero Lake	1416933	61°38′53″N 149°48′30″W	384 feet (117 m)			Matanuska-Susitna

== See also ==
- List of islands of Alaska
- List of reservoirs and dams of Alaska
- List of rivers of Alaska
- List of waterfalls of Alaska

== Notes ==
A: Note: Where a USGS GNIS Feature ID # is included:

- "Official" USGS GNIS dam, lake or reservoir name,
- Feature Class: Dam, Lake or Reservoir,
- Geographic coordinates,
- approximate Elevation, and
- Borough or Census Area

came from the United States Geological Survey Geographic Names Information System database.

B: Additional United States Geological Survey Geographic Names Information System references are included: Click on a particular row's GNIS Feature ID # in the included table's column above.

C: Borough or Census area reference total counts and queries:

# Dams and GNIS query Link	# Lakes and GNIS query Link	# Reservoirs and GNIS query Link	Borough or Census area	Comment
5	27	0	Aleutians East	Lakes in table; Reservoirs Done
15	134	0	Aleutians West	Lakes ?; Reservoirs Done
8	58	6	Anchorage	Lakes and Reservoirs in table.
0	81	0	Bethel	Lakes ?; Reservoirs Done
0	0	0	Bristol Bay	Lakes and Reservoirs Done
0	50	0	Denali	Lakes in table; Reservoirs Done
0	55	0	Dillingham	Lakes ?; Reservoirs Done
3	19	1	Fairbanks North Star	Lakes and Reservoirs in table.
3	10	0	Haines	Lakes in table; Reservoirs Done.
6	55	3	Hoonah-Angoon	Lakes and Reservoirs in table.
8	31	5	Juneau	Lakes and Reservoirs in table.
10	440	4	Kenai Peninsula	Lakes ?; Reservoirs in table.
12	57	8	Ketchikan Gateway	Lakes ?; Reservoirs in table.
31	82	11	Kodiak Island	Lakes ?; Reservoirs in table.
3	83	0	Lake and Peninsula	Lakes ?; Reservoirs Done
5	451	1	Matanuska-Susitna	Lakes ?; Reservoirs in table.
1	36	0	Nome	Lakes in table; Reservoirs Done
2	142	2	North Slope	Lakes ?; Reservoirs in table.
1	80	1	Northwest Arctic	Lakes ?; Reservoirs in table.
9	163	4	P. of Wales-O. Ketchikan	Lakes ?; Reservoirs in table.
9	90	3	Sitka	Lakes ?; Reservoirs in table.
3	9	3	Skagway	Lakes and Reservoirs in table.
0	130	0	Southeast Fairbanks	Lakes ?; Reservoirs in table.
22	293	10	Valdez-Cordova	Lakes ?; Reservoirs in table.
1	21	0	Kusilvak	Lakes in table; Reservoirs Done
8	60	5	Wrangell-Petersburg	Lakes ?; Reservoirs in table.
0	26	0	Yakutat	Lakes in table; Reservoirs Done
2	513	0	Yukon-Koyukuk	Lakes ?; Reservoirs Done
167	3197	67	TOTALS	

D: Mat-Su Drainage basin maps available. Matanuska-Susitna Borough major lakes:

- Big Lake
- Cottonwood Lake
- Horseshoe Lake
- Nancy Lake
- Red Shirt Lake

== Gallery ==
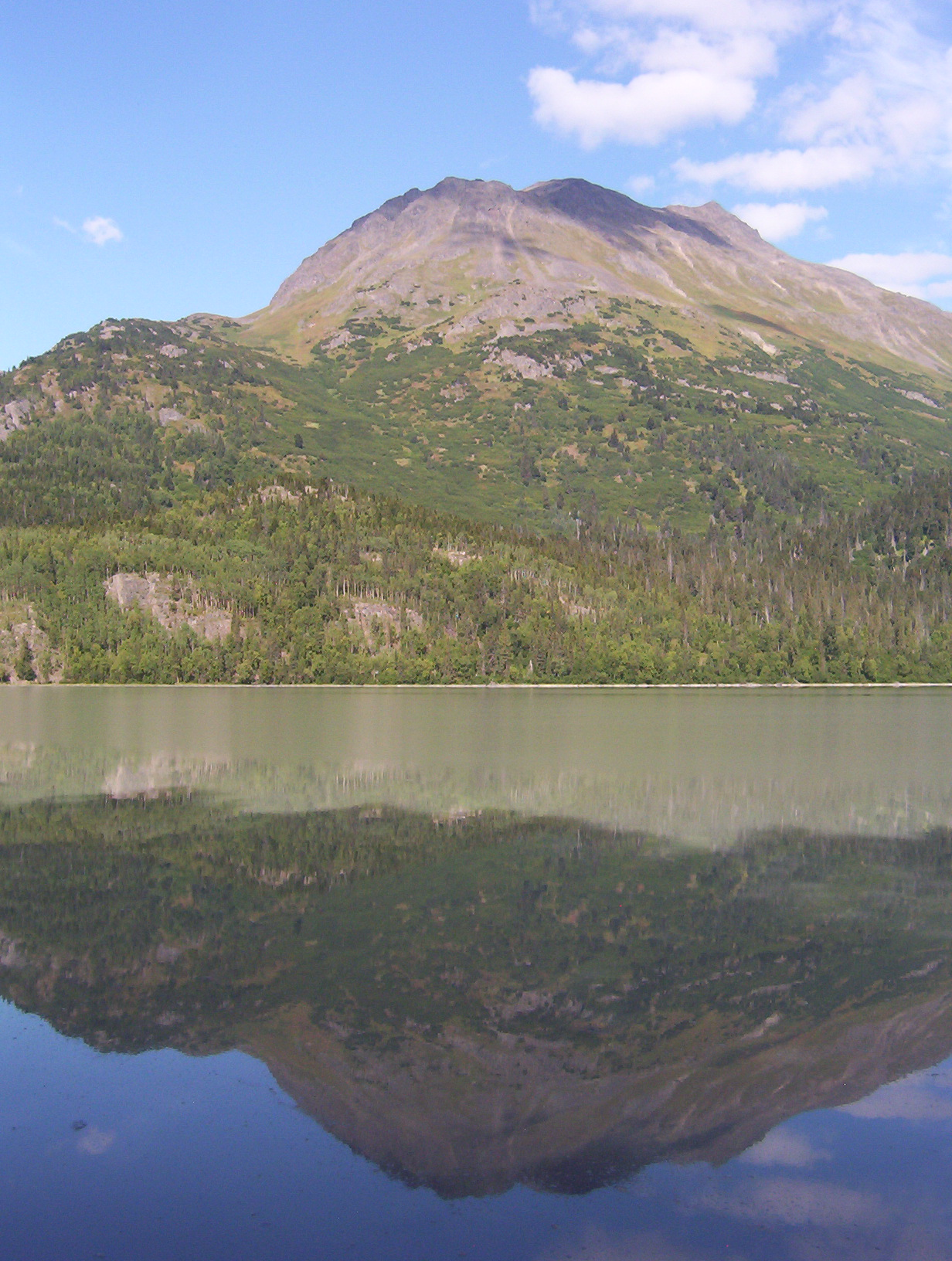
The Trail Lakes are in the Southern Chugach Mountains

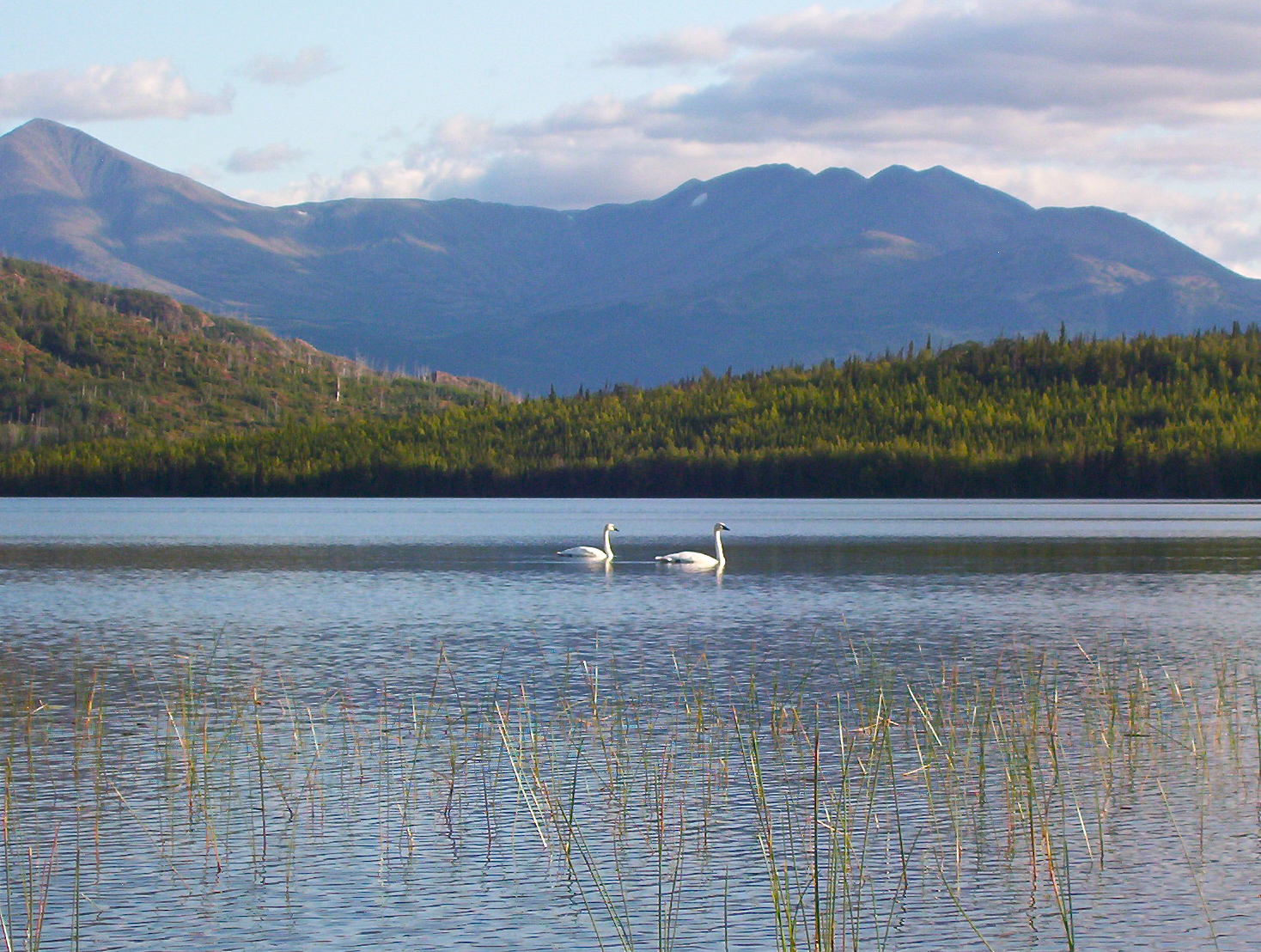
Trumpeter swans on a lake in the Kenai National Wildlife Refuge

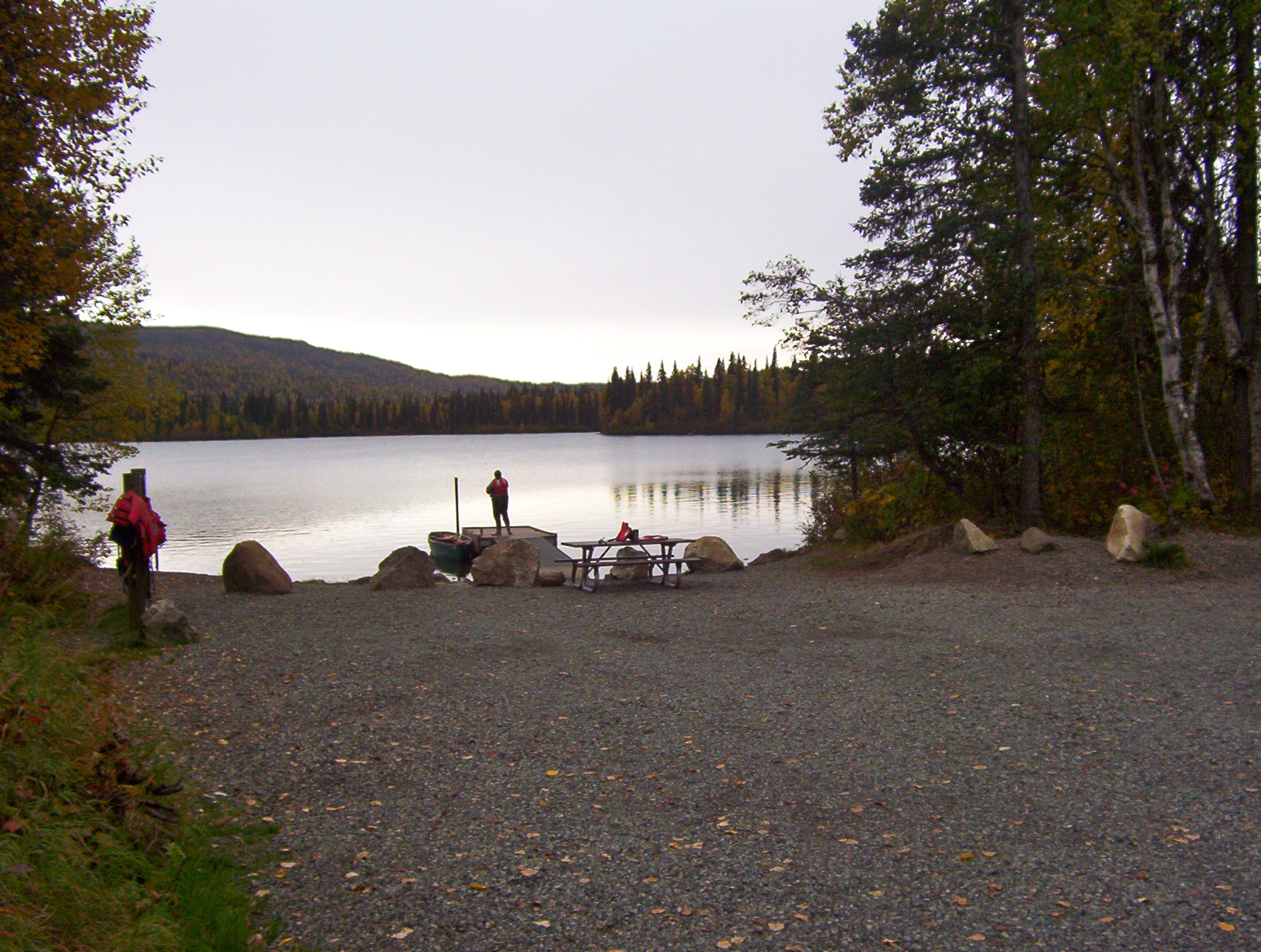
Motorized vessels are not permitted on Byers Lake

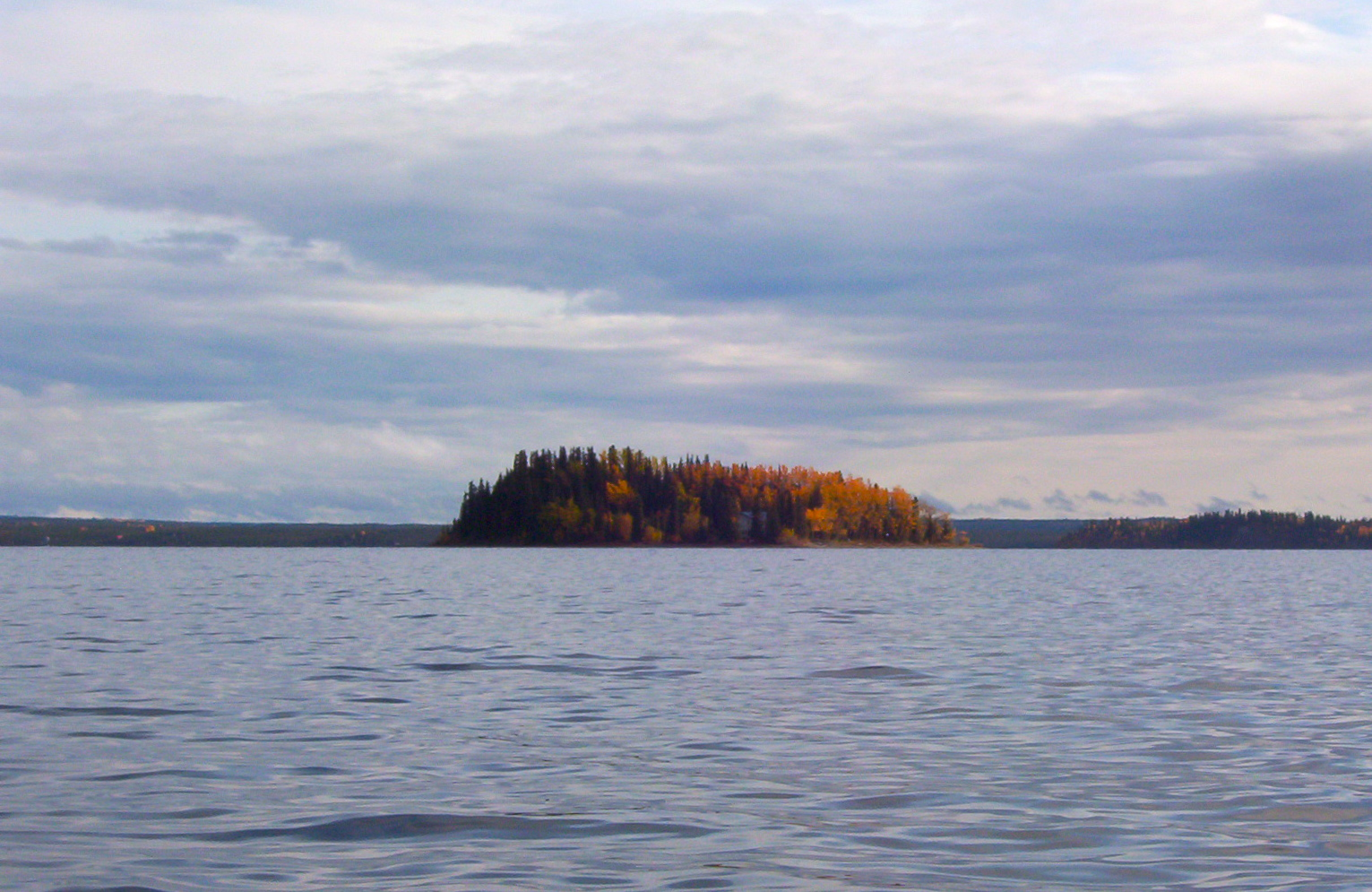
Lake Louise has several inhabited islands

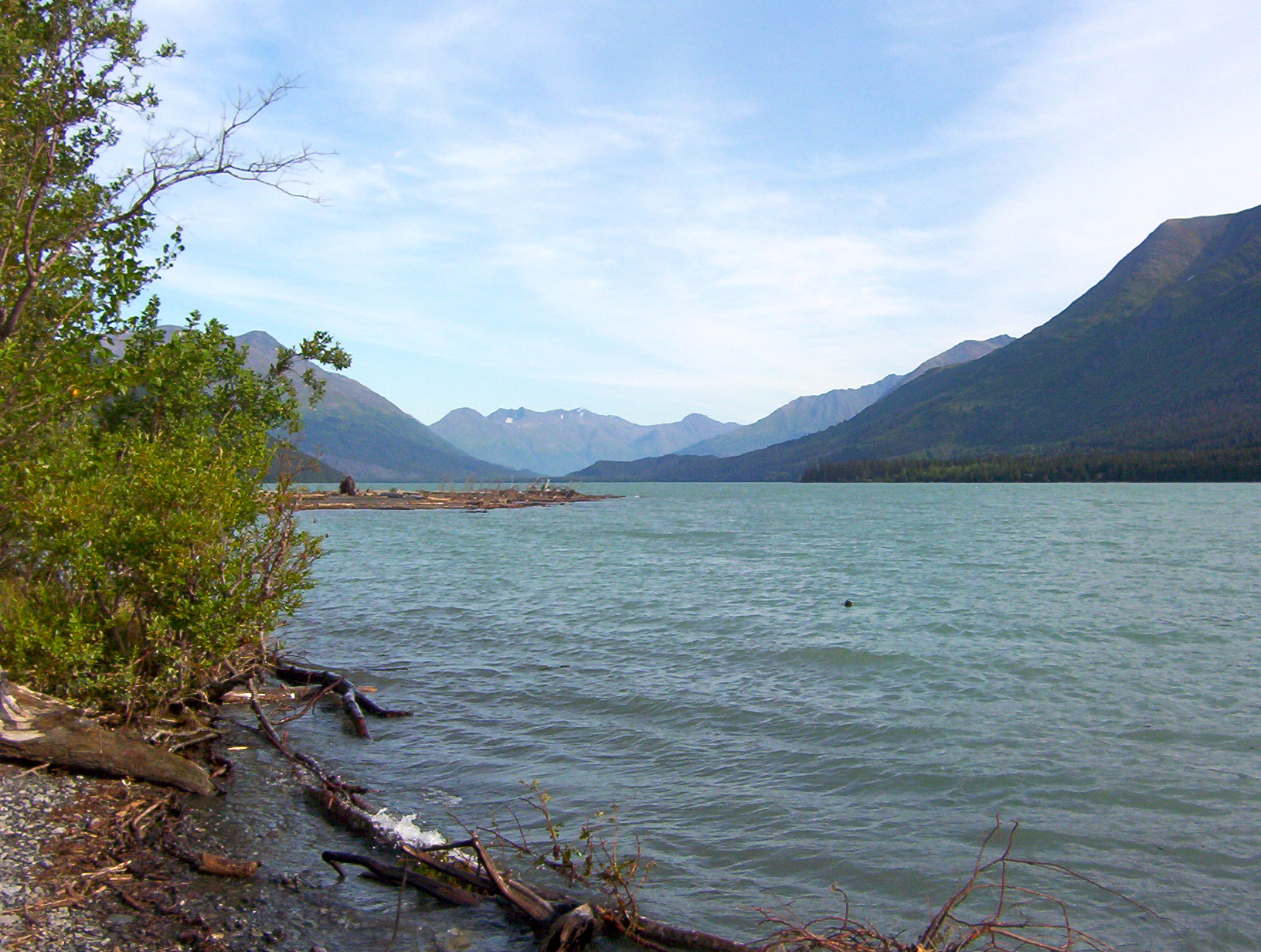
Kenai Lake forms the headwaters of the Kenai river, famous for its abundance of salmon

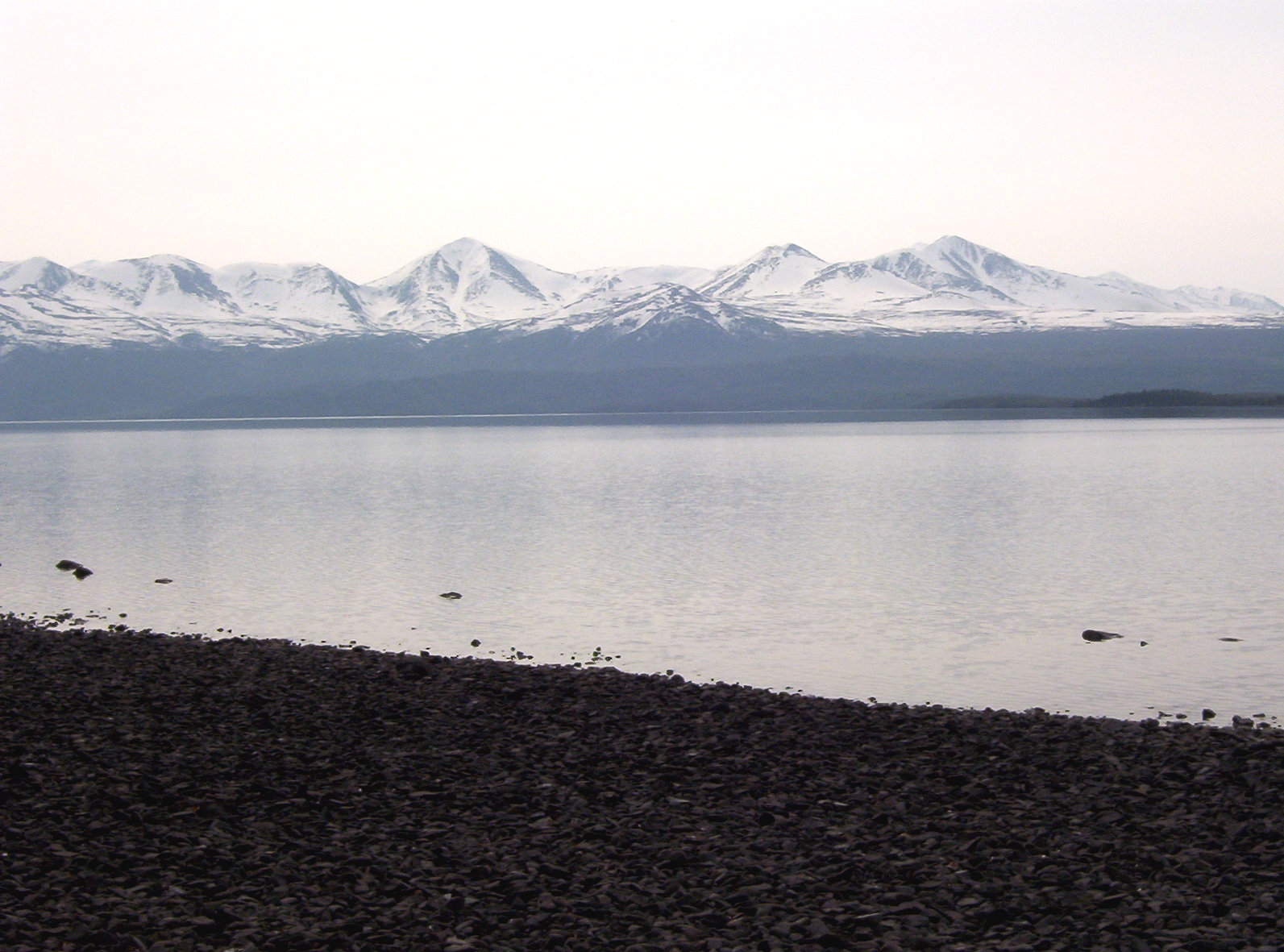
Skilak Lake is also part of the Kenai River system

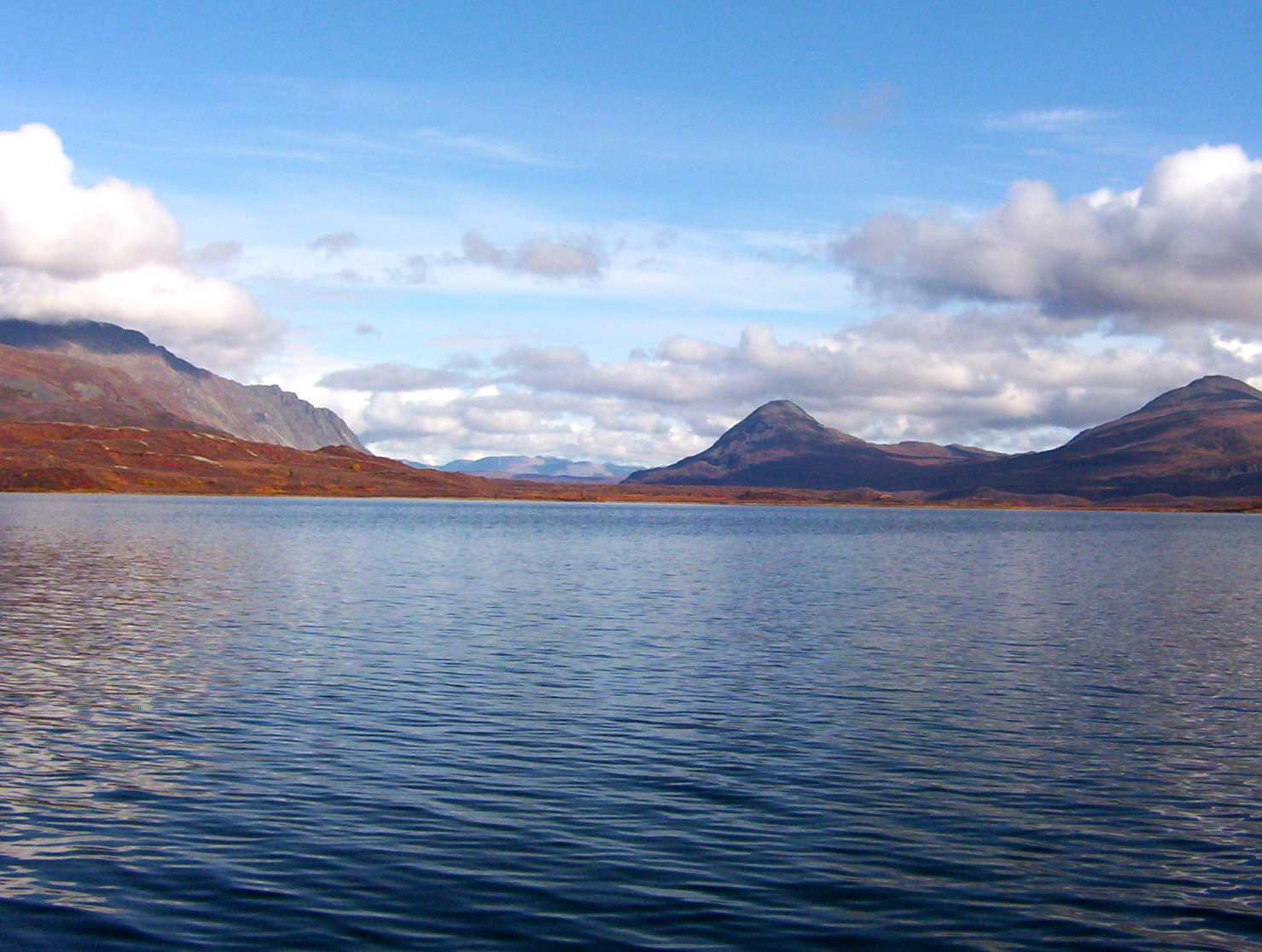
The Tangle Lakes are a popular destination for canoeists

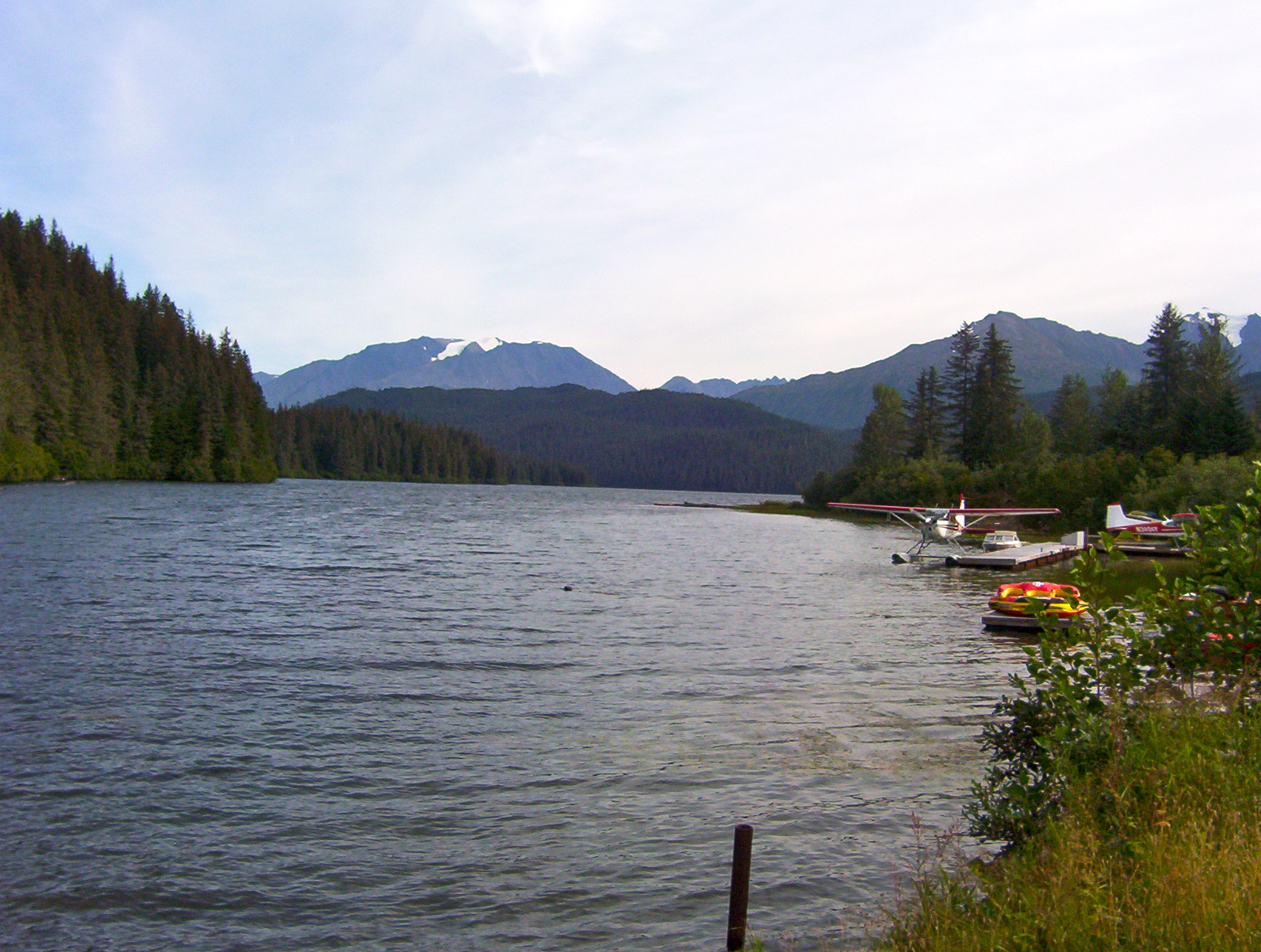
Lakes are important to both recreation and travel in Alaska

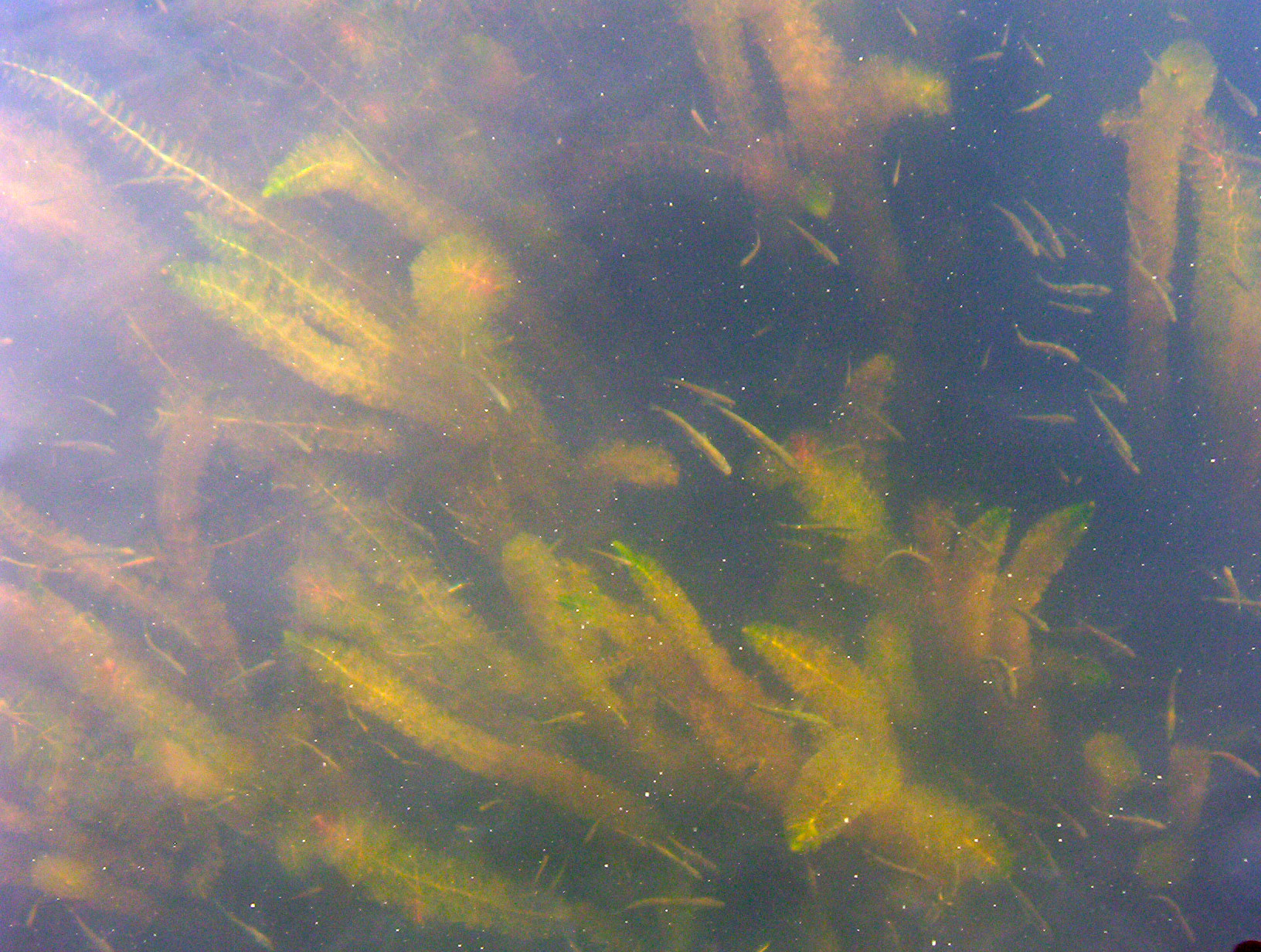
Lakes are important spawning areas for a wide variety of fish
