= Togiak Bay =

Coordinates: 58°55′31″N 160°26′45″W

Togiak Bay is an 18-mile-long (29-kilometer) bay in the U.S. state of Alaska. It extends southwest from the Togiak River to Hagemeister Island and east 25 miles (40 km) from Tongue Point to the mouth of the Negukthlik River.

== History ==
During the 1930s, Togiak Bay was identified by miners from Goodnews Bay as an area possibly containing ores. More than 3,000 claims had apparently been made there by September 1937.

During the 1990s, the bay had the richest herring fishery in Alaska. It was open to the public for fishing.
