= Izavieknik River =

Coordinates: 59°43′11″N 159°33′04″W

The Izavieknik River is a 22-mile-long (35 km) river in the U.S. state of Alaska. It flows southwest through Upper Togiak Lake to Togiak Lake, 85 miles (137 km) northeast of Goodnews Bay. The entire river lies within the Togiak Wilderness portion of Togiak National Wildlife Refuge.

== See also ==
- List of Alaska rivers
