= Togiak River =

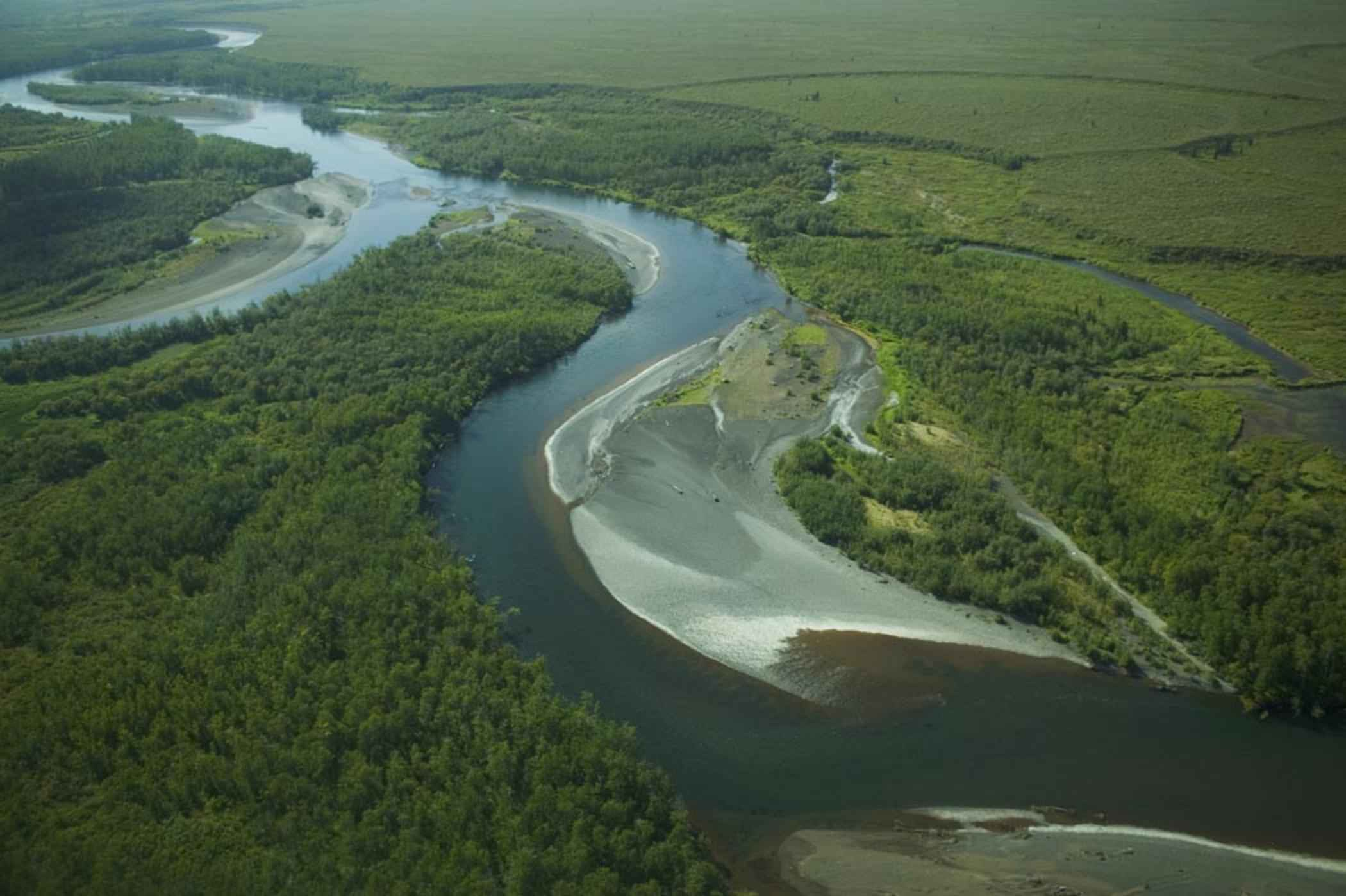
- Meandering Togiak River.

- Location of the mouth of the Togiak River in Alaska
- Native name: Tuyuryaq (Central Yupik)

Location
- Country: United States
- State: Alaska
- Census Area: Dillingham

Physical characteristics
- Source: Togiak Lake
  - location: Wood River Mountains, Togiak National Wildlife Refuge
  - coordinates: 59°32′07″N 159°41′11″W
  - elevation: 221 ft (67 m)
- Mouth: Togiak Bay
  - location: 2 miles (3.2 km) east of Togiak
  - coordinates: 59°04′23″N 160°20′05″W
  - elevation: 0 ft (0 m)
- Length: 48 mi (77 km)

Togiak River (Yup'ik: Tuyuryaq) is a stream, 48-mile (77 km) long, in the southwestern part of the U.S. state of Alaska. It begins at Togiak Lake in the Togiak Wilderness and flows southwest to Togiak Bay, 2 miles (3.2 km) east of Togiak.

Large catches of salmon are landed during the summer at the commercial cannery in Togiak, and the fishery is also very important for subsistence harvesting by the local Alaska Natives.

The Togiak is a popular and productive river for sport fishing, producing very good catches of all five species of Pacific salmon. Dolly Varden char and rainbow trout are also present, and sport fishing is a substantial contributor to the local economy.

The river itself is very scenic, especially in the upper wilderness area, flanked by hills and distant mountains. Float trips are becoming increasingly popular, with excellent chances of observing wildlife including brown bears, caribou, moose, eagles and beaver.

== See also ==
- List of rivers of Alaska
- Togiak Wilderness
