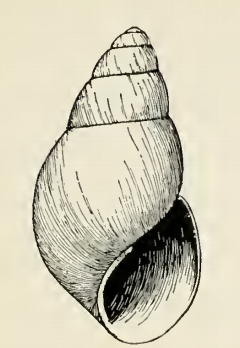
- Apertural view of a shell of Odostomia hagemeisteri

Scientific classification
- Kingdom: Animalia
- Phylum: Mollusca
- Class: Gastropoda
- Family: Pyramidellidae
- Genus: Odostomia
- Species: O. hagemeisteri

Binomial name
- Odostomia hagemeisteri Dall & Bartsch, 1909

= Odostomia hagemeisteri =

Species of gastropod

Odostomia hagemeisteri is a species of sea snail, a marine gastropod mollusc in the family Pyramidellidae, the pyrams and their allies.

Abbott (1974) considers this species a synonym of Odostomia tenuisculpta Carpenter, 1864

== Description ==
The small shell measures 4.4 mm. Iti is elongate ovate, yellowish white. The nuclear whorls are small, almost completely immersed in the first of the succeeding turns. The five post-nuclear whorls moderately well rounded, with rounded summits. They are marked by retractive lines of growth and many fine, closely placed spiral striations. The sutures are well impressed. The periphery of body whorl are well rounded. The base of the shell is well rounded, marked like the spire. The aperture is ovate. The posterior angle is acute. The outer lip is thick within and thin at the edge. The columella is very short, very strongly curved, somewhat revolute, reinforced by the attenuated base and provided with a strong fold at its insertion.

== Distribution ==
This species occurs in the Bering Sea off Hagemeister Island.
