= List of dams and reservoirs in Alaska =

Alaska has about 67 named artificial reservoirs, approximately 167 named dams,
and about 3,197 officially named natural lakes, out of over 3,000,000 unnamed natural lakes. For named natural lakes, see the list of lakes of Alaska.

== List ==
Name	Dam or Reservoir	GNIS Feature ID # Link	Coordinates	Elevation	Surface area square miles (Acres)	Municipality	Borough or Census area
Adak Log Dam	Dam	1417328	51°57′00″N 176°35′06″W	0 feet (0 m)			Aleutians West
Akhoik Dam	Dam	1417371	56°57′30″N 154°10′12″W	95 feet (29 m)			Kodiak Island
Akutan Power Dam	Dam	1417349	54°08′24″N 165°45′42″W	899 feet (274 m)			Aleutians East
Akutan Water Supply Dam	Dam	1417347	54°08′18″N 165°45′48″W	577 feet (176 m)			Aleutians East
Alaska Packers Association Chignik Dam	Dam	1417321	56°17′12″N 158°24′24″W	820 feet (250 m)			Lake and Peninsula
Aleut Creek Dam	Dam	1417269	52°51′12″N 173°08′06″E	0 feet (0 m)			Aleutians West
Alitak Cannery Dam Number 1	Dam	1417310	56°54′00″N 154°14′24″W	174 feet (53 m)			Kodiak Island
Alitak Cannery Dam Number 2	Dam	1417309	56°54′00″N 154°14′24″W	174 feet (53 m)			Kodiak Island
Alitak Cannery Dam Number 3	Dam	1417308	56°54′00″N 154°14′24″W	174 feet (53 m)			Kodiak Island
Alitak Cannery Dam Number 4	Dam	1417313	56°54′00″N 154°14′24″W	174 feet (53 m)			Kodiak Island
City of Angoon Dam	Dam	1417288	57°31′18″N 134°34′30″W	285 feet (87 m)			Hoonah-Angoon
Annex Lakes	Reservoir	1417173	58°19′36″N 134°7′42″W	725 feet (221 m)			Juneau
Annex Lakes Dam	Dam	1417172	58°19′36″N 134°07′42″W	725 feet (221 m)			Juneau
Apw Dam Number 1	Dam	1417239	60°31′54″N 145°45′12″W	397 feet (121 m)			Valdez-Cordova
APW Dam Number 2	Dam	1417276	60°31′48″N 145°45′06″W	400 feet (120 m)			Valdez-Cordova
APW Reservoir	Reservoir	1417240	60°31′54″N 145°45′12″W	397 feet (121 m)			Valdez-Cordova
APW Reservoir	Reservoir	1417277	60°31′48″N 145°45′6″W	400 feet (120 m)			Valdez-Cordova
Aquaculture Dam	Dam	1417199	60°02′54″N 148°04′36″W	249 feet (76 m)			Valdez-Cordova
Atka Power Dam	Dam	1417336	52°12′30″N 174°12′24″W	82 feet (25 m)			Aleutians West
Atka Water Supply Dam	Dam	1417331	52°12′30″N 174°12′24″W	82 feet (25 m)			Aleutians West
Bettinger A Dam	Dam	1417207	57°48′12″N 152°23′42″W	226 feet (69 m)			Kodiak Island
Lake Bettinger	Reservoir	1417208	57°48′12″N 152°23′42″W	226 feet (69 m)			Kodiak Island
Lake Bettinger B Dam	Dam	1417241	57°48′06″N 152°23′42″W	154 feet (47 m)			Kodiak Island
Lake Bettinger C Dam	Dam	1417243	57°48′06″N 152°23′36″W	151 feet (46 m)			Kodiak Island
Lake Bettinger D Dam	Dam	1417244	57°48′00″N 152°23′48″W	167 feet (51 m)			Kodiak Island
Lake Bettinger Lower Reservoir	Reservoir	1417242	57°48′6″N 152°23′42″W	154 feet (47 m)			Kodiak Island
Blue Lake	Reservoir	1420534	57°04′24″N 135°09′46″W	436 feet (133 m)			Sitka
Blue Lake Dam	Dam	1417171	57°03′42″N 135°11′56″W	436 feet (133 m)			Sitka
Bonny Rose Lake Dam	Dam	1417326	51°49′30″N 176°40′12″W	764 feet (233 m)			Aleutians West
Bradley Lake	Reservoir	1412666	59°44′53″N 150°47′17″W	1,089 feet (332 m)			Kenai Peninsula
Bridge Creek Dam	Dam	1417319	59°39′00″N 150°31′00″W	3,717 feet (1,133 m)			Kenai Peninsula
Campbell Lake Dam	Dam	1417217	61°07′51″N 149°57′30″W	59 feet (18 m)			Anchorage
Campbell Reservoir	Reservoir	1417218	61°7′48″N 149°57′42″W	23 feet (7.0 m)			Anchorage
Carlanna Lake Dam	Dam	1417185	55°22′18″N 131°40′48″W	840 feet (260 m)			Ketchikan Gateway
Cascade Creek Dam	Dam	1417351	57°05′30″N 135°20′30″W	1,768 feet (539 m)			Sitka
Cheimoviski Lake	Reservoir	1417212	60°32′54″N 148°9′0″W	358 feet (109 m)			Valdez-Cordova
Chena River Lakes Dam	Dam	1417302	64°47′24″N 147°11′00″W	472 feet (144 m)			Fairbanks North Star
Chester Creek Dam	Dam	1417219	61°12′24″N 149°55′18″W	7 feet (2.1 m)			Anchorage
Chester Lake	Reservoir	1417287	55°7′12″N 131°31′42″W	886 feet (270 m)			P. of Wales-O. Ketchikan
Chester Lake Dam	Dam	1417286	55°07′12″N 131°31′42″W	886 feet (270 m)			P. of Wales-O. Ketchikan
Chester Lake	Reservoir	1421006	55°7′9″N 131°31′46″W	853 feet (260 m)			P. of Wales-O. Ketchikan
Chester Lake Dam	Dam	1417193	55°07′09″N 131°31′46″W	853 feet (260 m)			P. of Wales-O. Ketchikan
Chiniak Satellite Tracking Station Dam	Dam	1417304	57°34′12″N 152°09′42″W	0 feet (0 m)			Kodiak Island
Columbia Wards Fisheries Incorporated Dam	Dam	1417348	56°19′12″N 158°36′54″W	331 feet (101 m)			Lake and Peninsula
Connell Lake	Reservoir	1421171	55°25′57″N 131°40′12″W	1,938 feet (591 m)			Ketchikan Gateway
Lake Connell Dam	Dam	1417184	55°25′57″N 131°40′12″W	289 feet (88 m)			Ketchikan Gateway
Cooper Lake	Reservoir	1417170	60°26′6″N 149°49′36″W	1,188 feet (362 m)			Kenai Peninsula
Cooper Lake Dam	Dam	1417169	60°26′06″N 149°49′36″W	1,188 feet (362 m)			Kenai Peninsula
Corner Bay Dam	Dam	1417353	57°43′30″N 135°09′12″W	699 feet (213 m)			Sitka
Country Gardens Nursery Dam	Dam	1417391	61°07′30″N 149°54′06″W	82 feet (25 m)			Anchorage
Crab Bay Dam Number 3	Dam	1417389	60°04′12″N 148°01′00″W	151 feet (46 m)			Valdez-Cordova
Craig Water Supply Dam	Dam	1417395	55°25′48″N 133°07′00″W	0 feet (0 m)			P. of Wales-O. Ketchikan
Crystal Lake	Reservoir	1417175	56°36′0″N 132°49′42″W	1,211 feet (369 m)			Wrangell-Petersburg
Crystal Lake Dam	Dam	1417174	56°36′00″N 132°49′42″W	1,211 feet (369 m)			Wrangell-Petersburg
Lake Demarie Dam	Dam	1417341	51°50′42″N 176°44′06″W	364 feet (111 m)			Aleutians West
Lower Dewey Lake Forebay	Reservoir	1417267	59°27′0″N 135°21′12″W	0 feet (0 m)			Skagway
Lower Dewey Lake Forebay Dam	Dam	1417266	59°27′00″N 135°21′12″W	0 feet (0 m)			Skagway
Lower Dewey Lake Number 1 Dam	Dam	1417182	59°27′00″N 135°18′42″W	538 feet (164 m)			Skagway
Lower Dewey Reservoir	Reservoir	1417183	59°27′0″N 135°18′42″W	538 feet (164 m)			Skagway
Upper Dewey Lake Dam	Dam	1417247	59°27′00″N 135°14′00″W	4,183 feet (1,275 m)			Skagway
Upper Dewey Reservoir	Reservoir	1417248	59°27′0″N 135°14′0″W	4,183 feet (1,275 m)			Skagway
Douglas Island Reservoir Dam	Dam	1417291	58°16′42″N 134°25′06″W	436 feet (133 m)			Juneau
Eklutna Dam	Dam	1417227	61°24′19″N 149°08′33″W	869 feet (265 m)			Matanuska-Susitna
Eklutna Lake	Reservoir	1401730	61°24′19″N 149°8′52″W	886 feet (270 m)			Anchorage
Lower Eklutna Dam	Dam	1417311	61°27′00″N 149°19′30″W	597 feet (182 m)			Anchorage
Ellamar Dam Number 1	Dam	1417384	60°53′48″N 146°41′18″W	184 feet (56 m)			Valdez-Cordova
Ellamar Dam Number 2	Dam	1417385	60°53′48″N 146°41′24″W	154 feet (47 m)			Valdez-Cordova
Engstrom Dam	Dam	1417359	64°40′54″N 155°14′48″W	614 feet (187 m)			Yukon-Koyukuk
Excursion Cannery Water Supply	Reservoir	1417299	58°24′48″N 136°36′30″W	1,732 feet (528 m)			Hoonah-Angoon
Excursion Inlet Cannery Dam	Dam	1417298	58°24′48″N 136°36′30″W	1,732 feet (528 m)			Hoonah-Angoon
Eyak Lake Dam	Dam	1417253	60°31′54″N 145°38′36″W	39 feet (12 m)			Valdez-Cordova
False Pass Dam	Dam	1417345	54°52′12″N 163°26′24″W	492 feet (150 m)			Aleutians East
Fawn Lake	Reservoir	1417234	55°21′3″N 131°37′6″W	469 feet (143 m)			Ketchikan Gateway
Fawn Lake	Reservoir	1417236	55°21′10″N 131°37′7″W	492 feet (150 m)			Ketchikan Gateway
North Fawn Lake Dam	Dam	1417235	55°21′12″N 131°37′12″W	423 feet (129 m)			Ketchikan Gateway
South Fawn Lake Dam	Dam	1417233	55°21′06″N 131°37′12″W	377 feet (115 m)			Ketchikan Gateway
Fish Creek Dam	Dam	1417314	59°26′30″N 151°41′00″W	709 feet (216 m)			Kenai Peninsula
Gregory Lake Dam	Dam	1417232	61°17′29″N 149°48′52″W	92 feet (28 m)			Anchorage
Haines Army Depot Water Supply Dam	Dam	1417382	59°16′30″N 135°28′30″W	728 feet (222 m)			Haines
Old Harbor City Dam	Dam	1417387	57°09′54″N 153°19′48″W	0 feet (0 m)			Kodiak Island
Hayden Lake Dam	Dam	1417213	60°02′12″N 147°24′30″W	1,138 feet (347 m)			Valdez-Cordova
Lake Hayden	Reservoir	1417214	60°2′12″N 147°24′30″W	1,138 feet (347 m)			Valdez-Cordova
Hess Creek Dam	Dam	1417196	65°35′36″N 148°23′30″W	1,165 feet (355 m)			Yukon-Koyukuk
Lake 'O' the Hills	Reservoir	1417229	61°7′0″N 149°45′0″W	833 feet (254 m)			Anchorage
Lake 'O' the Hills Dam	Dam	1417228	61°07′00″N 149°45′00″W	833 feet (254 m)			Anchorage
Humpback Creek Number 1 Dam	Dam	1417295	60°35′30″N 145°39′54″W	1,683 feet (513 m)			Valdez-Cordova
Humpback Creek Number 2 Dam	Dam	1417296	60°35′30″N 145°40′12″W	1,581 feet (482 m)			Valdez-Cordova
Humpback Creek Number 3 Dam	Dam	1417255	60°35′00″N 145°40′00″W	85 feet (26 m)			Valdez-Cordova
Hydaburg Dam	Dam	1417338	55°13′06″N 132°48′00″W	689 feet (210 m)			P. of Wales-O. Ketchikan
Independence Mine Dam	Dam	1417360	61°49′24″N 149°14′30″W	3,314 feet (1,010 m)			Matanuska-Susitna
Indian River Dam	Dam	1417223	57°02′54″N 135°18′48″W	23 feet (7.0 m)			Sitka
Isatkoak Dam	Dam	1417256	71°16′00″N 156°45′00″W	52 feet (16 m)			North Slope
Isatkoak Reservoir	Reservoir	1417257	71°16′0″N 156°45′0″W	52 feet (16 m)			North Slope
Itasigrook Dam	Dam	1417260	71°16′00″N 156°46′00″W	56 feet (17 m)			North Slope
Jerome Lake	Reservoir	1417294	60°32′50″N 149°34′30″W	1,010 feet (310 m)			Kenai Peninsula
Jerome Lake Dam	Dam	1417293	60°33′12″N 149°34′48″W	1,106 feet (337 m)			Kenai Peninsula
Jim Edwards Dam	Dam	1417386	61°25′30″N 142°58′42″W	1,296 feet (395 m)			Valdez-Cordova
City of Kake Dam	Dam	1417363	56°58′24″N 133°56′12″W	108 feet (33 m)			Wrangell-Petersburg
Old Kake Dam	Dam	1417394	56°58′42″N 133°56′24″W	131 feet (40 m)			Wrangell-Petersburg
Karluk Lagoon Dam	Dam	1417372	57°35′18″N 154°26′24″W	0 feet (0 m)			Kodiak Island
Old Karluk Dam	Dam	1417373	57°34′12″N 154°28′18″W	351 feet (107 m)			Kodiak Island
Kennel Creek Dam	Dam	1417352	57°39′12″N 135°00′00″W	456 feet (139 m)			Sitka
Ketchikan Debris Control Dam	Dam	1417362	55°21′24″N 131°37′12″W	351 feet (107 m)			Ketchikan Gateway
Ketchikan Diversion Dam	Dam	1417361	55°21′24″N 131°37′12″W	351 feet (107 m)			Ketchikan Gateway
Ketchikan Lakes Dam	Dam	1417176	55°21′36″N 131°37′06″W	354 feet (108 m)			Ketchikan Gateway
Lower and Upper Ketchikan Lakes	Reservoir	1417177	55°21′36″N 131°37′6″W	354 feet (108 m)			Ketchikan Gateway
Big Kitoi Dam	Dam	1417221	58°11′24″N 152°22′36″W	108 feet (33 m)			Kodiak Island
Big Kitoi Lake	Reservoir	1417222	58°11′24″N 152°22′36″W	108 feet (33 m)			Kodiak Island
Klawock Dam	Dam	1417365	55°33′18″N 133°00′00″W	600 feet (180 m)			P. of Wales-O. Ketchikan
Klukwan Dam	Dam	1417383	59°24′06″N 135°51′24″W	1,965 feet (599 m)			Haines
Kotzebue Water Supply Dam	Dam	1417272	66°53′18″N 162°32′18″W	82 feet (25 m)			Northwest Arctic
Larson Bay Cannery Dam	Dam	1417306	57°31′06″N 153°58′30″W	715 feet (218 m)			Kodiak Island
Lake Leone Dam	Dam	1417327	51°50′42″N 176°28′24″W	1,178 feet (359 m)			Aleutians West
Long Lake	Reservoir	1417246	58°10′0″N 133°44′0″W	1,079 feet (329 m)			Juneau
Lost Lake	Reservoir	1417380	60°31′36″N 144°24′48″W	2,096 feet (639 m)			Valdez-Cordova
Lost Lake Dam	Dam	1417379	60°31′36″N 144°24′48″W	2,096 feet (639 m)			Valdez-Cordova
Louie Nelson Homestead Dam	Dam	1417377	59°09′24″N 135°21′42″W	79 feet (24 m)			Haines
Lowell Creek Dam	Dam	1417268	60°06′00″N 149°27′00″W	653 feet (199 m)			Kenai Peninsula
Meals Lake	Reservoir	1417198	60°31′42″N 145°45′0″W	407 feet (124 m)			Valdez-Cordova
Meals Lake Dam	Dam	1417197	60°31′42″N 145°45′00″W	407 feet (124 m)			Valdez-Cordova
Memory Lake Estates Dam Number 1	Dam	1417339	61°37′06″N 149°25′36″W	430 feet (130 m)			Matanuska-Susitna
Memory Lake Estates Dam Number 2	Dam	1417358	61°37′36″N 149°22′48″W	453 feet (138 m)			Matanuska-Susitna
Middle Stream Lower Dam	Dam	1417333	52°12′30″N 174°12′24″W	82 feet (25 m)			Aleutians West
Middle Stream Middle Dam	Dam	1417334	52°12′30″N 174°12′24″W	82 feet (25 m)			Aleutians West
Middle Stream Upper Dam	Dam	1417335	52°12′30″N 174°12′24″W	82 feet (25 m)			Aleutians West
Mitchell Creek Dam	Dam	1417330	51°57′18″N 176°36′36″W	236 feet (72 m)			Aleutians West
Monashka Creek Dam	Dam	1417284	57°50′36″N 152°29′06″W	988 feet (301 m)			Kodiak Island
Monashka Reservoir	Reservoir	1417285	57°50′36″N 152°29′6″W	988 feet (301 m)			Kodiak Island
Moose Creek Reservoir	Reservoir	1417303	64°47′24″N 147°11′0″W	472 feet (144 m)			Fairbanks North Star
Mountain Point Community Reservoir	Reservoir	1417224	57°2′54″N 135°18′48″W	23 feet (7.0 m)			Sitka
NASA Tracking Station Dam Number 1	Dam	1417317	64°58′48″N 147°25′48″W	1,398 feet (426 m)			Fairbanks North Star
NASA Tracking Station Dam Number 2	Dam	1417378	64°58′48″N 147°25′48″W	1,398 feet (426 m)			Fairbanks North Star
Nerravak Lagoon	Reservoir	1417261	71°16′0″N 156°46′0″W	56 feet (17 m)			North Slope
New England Fish Company Dam Sand Point	Dam	1417340	55°19′30″N 160°30′00″W	289 feet (88 m)			Aleutians East
North Lake Dam Nw Side	Dam	1417324	51°57′36″N 176°35′06″W	322 feet (98 m)			Aleutians West
North Lake Dam Se Side	Dam	1417325	51°57′36″N 176°34′48″W	282 feet (86 m)			Aleutians West
North Stream Lower Dam	Dam	1417332	52°12′30″N 174°12′24″W	82 feet (25 m)			Aleutians West
Nugget Creek	Reservoir	1417252	58°25′0″N 134°34′0″W	56 feet (17 m)			Juneau
Nugget Creek Dam	Dam	1417251	58°25′00″N 134°34′00″W	56 feet (17 m)			Juneau
Nurses Creek Dam	Dam	1417346	51°54′48″N 176°39′00″W	164 feet (50 m)			Aleutians West
Lake Ospery	Reservoir	1417265	56°23′54″N 134°39′36″W	184 feet (56 m)			Sitka
Lake Ospery Dam	Dam	1417264	56°23′54″N 134°39′36″W	184 feet (56 m)			Sitka
Otter Lake Dam	Dam	1417289	61°17′12″N 149°43′36″W	95 feet (29 m)			Anchorage
City of Ouzinkie Dam	Dam	1417305	57°52′42″N 152°27′48″W	108 feet (33 m)			Kodiak Island
City of Ouzinkie Lower Dam	Dam	1417370	57°52′36″N 152°27′48″W	95 feet (29 m)			Kodiak Island
Pedersen Dam	Dam	1417396	60°32′54″N 150°44′48″W	125 feet (38 m)			Kenai Peninsula
Pelican Creek Dam	Dam	1417237	57°58′24″N 136°12′48″W	1,040 feet (320 m)			Hoonah-Angoon
Pelican Reservoir	Reservoir	1417238	57°58′24″N 136°12′48″W	1,040 feet (320 m)			Hoonah-Angoon
Peter Pan Seafoods Chignik Dam	Dam	1417344	56°17′48″N 158°21′54″W	597 feet (182 m)			Lake and Peninsula
Petersburg Dam	Dam	1417194	56°46′48″N 132°54′54″W	387 feet (118 m)			Wrangell-Petersburg
Petersburg Lower Reservoir	Reservoir	1417259	56°47′24″N 132°54′42″W	289 feet (88 m)			Wrangell-Petersburg
Petersburg Lower Reservoir Dam	Dam	1417258	56°47′24″N 132°54′42″W	289 feet (88 m)			Wrangell-Petersburg
Petersburg Reservoir	Reservoir	1417195	56°46′48″N 132°54′54″W	387 feet (118 m)			Wrangell-Petersburg
Pillar Creek 2 Main Dam Dike C	Dam	1417203	57°48′12″N 152°25′30″W	295 feet (90 m)			Kodiak Island
Pillar Creek Dam Number 2 Dike A	Dam	1417278	57°48′12″N 152°25′30″W	295 feet (90 m)			Kodiak Island
Pillar Creek Dam Number 3	Dam	1417392	57°48′12″N 152°25′30″W	295 feet (90 m)			Kodiak Island
Pillar Creek Lower Reservoir	Reservoir	1417393	57°48′12″N 152°25′30″W	295 feet (90 m)			Kodiak Island
Pillar Creek Number 1 Upper Dam A	Dam	1417201	57°48′06″N 152°26′18″W	108 feet (33 m)			Kodiak Island
Pillar Creek Number 1 Upper Dam B	Dam	1417282	57°48′06″N 152°26′18″W	108 feet (33 m)			Kodiak Island
Pillar Creek Number 2 Dike B Dam	Dam	1417280	57°48′12″N 152°25′30″W	295 feet (90 m)			Kodiak Island
Pillar Creek Reservoir	Reservoir	1407982	57°48′14″N 152°26′5″W	69 feet (21 m)			Kodiak Island
Pillar Creek Upper Reservoir	Reservoir	1417202	57°48′6″N 152°26′18″W	108 feet (33 m)			Kodiak Island
City of Port Alexander Dam	Dam	1417322	56°15′36″N 134°41′30″W	1,207 feet (368 m)			Sitka
Port Alexander Cold Storage Dam	Dam	1417357	56°14′42″N 134°41′30″W	446 feet (136 m)			Sitka
Port Graham Dam Number 1	Dam	1417381	59°20′48″N 151°50′42″W	312 feet (95 m)			Kenai Peninsula
Port Graham Dam Number 2	Dam	1417315	59°20′42″N 151°50′12″W	253 feet (77 m)			Kenai Peninsula
Port Lions Dam	Dam	1417307	57°51′12″N 152°54′12″W	194 feet (59 m)			Kodiak Island
Port Wakefield Dam	Dam	1417388	58°03′00″N 153°03′00″W	0 feet (0 m)			Kodiak Island
Port William Dam	Dam	1417318	58°29′30″N 152°34′36″W	46 feet (14 m)			Kodiak Island
Purple Lake	Reservoir	1417263	55°6′30″N 131°26′30″W	367 feet (112 m)			P. of Wales-O. Ketchikan
Purple Lake Dam	Dam	1417262	55°06′30″N 131°26′30″W	367 feet (112 m)			P. of Wales-O. Ketchikan
Upper Rainbow Lake	Reservoir	1417271	61°36′0″N 149°0′0″W	545 feet (166 m)			Matanuska-Susitna
Lower Reservoir	Reservoir	1405772	57°48′5″N 152°23′46″W	161 feet (49 m)			Kodiak Island
Middle Reservoir	Reservoir	1417204	57°48′12″N 152°25′30″W	295 feet (90 m)			Kodiak Island
Upper Reservoir	Reservoir	1417206	57°48′18″N 152°24′6″W	459 feet (140 m)			Kodiak Island
Upper Reservoir	Reservoir	1417283	57°48′6″N 152°26′18″W	108 feet (33 m)			Kodiak Island
Upper Reservoir Dam	Dam	1417205	57°48′18″N 152°24′06″W	459 feet (140 m)			Kodiak Island
Rowan Bay Dam	Dam	1417350	56°40′24″N 134°12′00″W	200 feet (61 m)			Wrangell-Petersburg
Roycroft Lake Dam	Dam	1417297	60°29′24″N 149°22′24″W	600 feet (180 m)			Kenai Peninsula
Salmon Creek Dam	Dam	1409010	58°20′30″N 134°24′05″W	1,125 feet (343 m)			Juneau
Salmon Creek Reservoir	Reservoir	1419165	58°20′30″N 134°24′5″W	1,125 feet (343 m)			Juneau
Salt Chuck Mine Dam	Dam	1417368	55°37′54″N 132°31′30″W	440 feet (130 m)			P. of Wales-O. Ketchikan
San Juan Lake	Reservoir	1417200	60°2′54″N 148°4′36″W	249 feet (76 m)			Valdez-Cordova
Sandra Lake	Reservoir	1417275	60°12′0″N 147°49′0″W	217 feet (66 m)			Valdez-Cordova
Sandra Lake Dam	Dam	1417274	60°12′00″N 147°49′00″W	217 feet (66 m)			Valdez-Cordova
Saxman Dam	Dam	1417364	55°19′18″N 131°35′36″W	161 feet (49 m)			Ketchikan Gateway
Saxman Lower Reservoir Dam	Dam	1417300	55°19′25″N 131°35′36″W	236 feet (72 m)			Ketchikan Gateway
Saxman Reservoir	Reservoir	1419165	55°19′12″N 131°55′0″W	0 feet (0 m)			Ketchikan Gateway
Seldovia Reservoir	Reservoir	1417210	59°26′0″N 151°42′0″W	98 feet (30 m)			Kenai Peninsula
Seldovia Upper Dam	Dam	1417209	59°26′00″N 151°42′00″W	98 feet (30 m)			Kenai Peninsula
Sheldon Jackson College Dam	Dam	1417369	57°02′30″N 135°18′30″W	0 feet (0 m)			Sitka
Sherwood Estates Dam	Dam	1417270	61°36′00″N 149°00′00″W	545 feet (166 m)			Matanuska-Susitna
Ship Creek Dam	Dam	1417230	61°15′00″N 149°40′00″W	351 feet (107 m)			Anchorage
Ship Creek Reservoir	Reservoir	1417231	61°15′0″N 149°40′0″W	351 feet (107 m)			Anchorage
Shotter Creek Dam	Dam	1417225	58°07′06″N 135°23′30″W	1,332 feet (406 m)			Hoonah-Angoon
Lower Silvis Lake	Reservoir	1423451	55°22′55″N 131°30′43″W	807 feet (246 m)			Ketchikan Gateway
Lower Silvis Lake Dam	Dam	1417180	55°22′54″N 131°30′12″W	817 feet (249 m)			Ketchikan Gateway
Upper Silvis Lake	Reservoir	1415517	55°22′39″N 131°31′56″W	1,112 feet (339 m)			Ketchikan Gateway
Upper Silvis Lake Dam	Dam	1417178	55°22′54″N 131°31′00″W	823 feet (251 m)			Ketchikan Gateway
Site Lake	Reservoir	1417226	58°7′6″N 135°23′30″W	1,332 feet (406 m)			Hoonah-Angoon
Sixmile Lake	Reservoir	1419252	61°17′29″N 149°48′52″W	92 feet (28 m)			Anchorage
Slate Creek Dam	Dam	1417397	63°10′18″N 145°47′54″W	3,350 feet (1,020 m)			Valdez-Cordova
Snettisham Dam	Dam	1417245	58°10′00″N 133°44′00″W	1,079 feet (329 m)			Juneau
Solomon Gulch Dam A	Dam	1417329	61°04′24″N 146°18′00″W	686 feet (209 m)			Valdez-Cordova
Solomon Gulch Dam B	Dam	1417342	61°04′24″N 146°18′00″W	686 feet (209 m)			Valdez-Cordova
Solomon Gulch Lake	Reservoir	1417343	61°4′24″N 146°18′0″W	686 feet (209 m)			Valdez-Cordova
Solomon Lake	Reservoir	1417216	61°4′24″N 146°18′6″W	686 feet (209 m)			Valdez-Cordova
Solomon Lake Dam	Dam	1417215	61°04′24″N 146°18′06″W	686 feet (209 m)			Valdez-Cordova
Squaw Harbor Dam	Dam	1417323	55°14′48″N 160°32′42″W	299 feet (91 m)			Aleutians East
Stovers Dam	Dam	1417316	57°48′48″N 152°22′12″W	125 feet (38 m)			Kodiak Island
Switzer Creek Number 2 Dam	Dam	1417292	58°21′54″N 134°30′00″W	95 feet (29 m)			Juneau
Taku Cannery Dam	Dam	1417356	58°04′24″N 134°01′18″W	46 feet (14 m)			Juneau
Tatitlek Dam	Dam	1417390	60°52′06″N 146°40′12″W	141 feet (43 m)			Valdez-Cordova
Tatitlek Supply Dam	Dam	1417366	60°52′30″N 146°40′06″W	249 feet (76 m)			Valdez-Cordova
Tease Lake Dam	Dam	1417374	58°06′00″N 133°40′12″W	2,762 feet (842 m)			Juneau
Tease Reservoir	Reservoir	1417375	58°6′0″N 133°40′12″W	2,762 feet (842 m)			Juneau
Tenakee Spring School Dam	Dam	1417355	58°15′00″N 135°15′30″W	932 feet (284 m)			Hoonah-Angoon
Tenakee Springs Dam	Dam	1417354	58°15′00″N 135°15′30″W	932 feet (284 m)			Hoonah-Angoon
Tin City Dam	Dam	1417320	65°32′06″N 167°58′18″W	0 feet (0 m)			Nome
Tuxkan Dam	Dam	1417367	56°18′00″N 133°36′36″W	200 feet (61 m)			P. of Wales-O. Ketchikan
Uyak Cannery Dam	Dam	1417312	57°25′48″N 153°54′00″W	112 feet (34 m)			Kodiak Island
Vortac Lake	Reservoir	1417273	66°53′18″N 162°32′18″W	82 feet (25 m)			Northwest Arctic
Waterfall Dam	Dam	1417249	55°17′48″N 133°14′06″W	249 feet (76 m)			P. of Wales-O. Ketchikan
Waterfall Reservoir	Reservoir	1417250	55°17′48″N 133°14′6″W	249 feet (76 m)			P. of Wales-O. Ketchikan
Weare Dike	Dam	1411813	61°37′14″N 161°46′19″W	0 feet (0 m)			Kusilvak
West Gables Cannery Dam	Dam	1417211	60°32′54″N 148°09′00″W	358 feet (109 m)			Valdez-Cordova
Westchester Lagoon	Reservoir	1417220	61°12′24″N 149°55′18″W	7 feet (2.1 m)			Anchorage
Whitman Lake	Reservoir	1415754	55°20′11″N 131°32′51″W	341 feet (104 m)			Ketchikan Gateway
Whitman Lake Dam	Dam	1417187	55°20′00″N 131°31′48″W	348 feet (106 m)			Ketchikan Gateway
Wrangell Lower Dam	Dam	1417191	56°27′18″N 132°22′30″W	305 feet (93 m)			Wrangell-Petersburg
Wrangell Lower Reservoir	Reservoir	1417192	56°27′18″N 132°22′30″W	305 feet (93 m)			Wrangell-Petersburg
Wrangell Upper Dam	Dam	1417189	56°27′42″N 132°21′36″W	390 feet (120 m)			Wrangell-Petersburg
Wrangell Upper Reservoir	Reservoir	1417190	56°27′42″N 132°21′36″W	390 feet (120 m)			Wrangell-Petersburg
Zachar Bay Fisheries Dam	Dam	1417376	57°33′18″N 153°44′06″W	190 feet (58 m)			Kodiak Island

== Notes ==
A: Note: Where a USGS GNIS Feature ID # is included:

- "Official" USGS GNIS dam, lake or reservoir name,
- Feature Class: Dam, Lake or Reservoir,
- Geographic coordinates,
- approximate Elevation, and
- Borough or Census Area

came from the United States Geological Survey Geographic Names Information System database.

B: Additional United States Geological Survey Geographic Names Information System references are included: Click on a particular Lake's GNIS Feature ID # in the included table's column above.

C: Borough or Census area reference total counts and queries:

# Dams and GNIS query Link	# Lakes and GNIS query Link	# Reservoirs and GNIS query Link	Borough or Census area	Comment
5	27	0	Aleutians East	Dams in table; Reservoirs Done
15	134	0	Aleutians West	Dams in table; Reservoirs Done
8	58	6	Anchorage	Dams and Reservoirs in table.
0	81	0	Bethel	Dams and Reservoirs Done
0	0	0	Bristol Bay	Dams and Reservoirs Done
0	50	0	Denali	Dams and Reservoirs Done
0	55	0	Dillingham	Dams and Reservoirs Done
3	19	1	Fairbanks North Star	Dams and Reservoirs in table.
3	10	0	Haines	Dams in table; Reservoirs Done.
6	55	3	Hoonah-Angoon	Dams and Reservoirs in table.
8	31	5	Juneau	Dams and Reservoirs in table.
10	440	4	Kenai Peninsula	Dams and Reservoirs in table.
12	57	8	Ketchikan Gateway	Dams and Reservoirs in table.
31	82	11	Kodiak Island	Dams and Reservoirs in table.
3	83	0	Lake and Peninsula	Dams in table; Reservoirs Done
5	451	1	Matanuska-Susitna	Dams and Reservoirs in table.
1	36	0	Nome	Dams in table; Reservoirs Done
2	142	2	North Slope	Dams and Reservoirs in table.
1	80	1	Northwest Arctic	Dams and Reservoirs in table.
9	163	4	P. of Wales-O. Ketchikan	Dams and Reservoirs in table.
9	90	3	Sitka	Dams and Reservoirs in table.
3	9	3	Skagway	Dams and Reservoirs in table.
0	130	0	Southeast Fairbanks	Dams and Reservoirs in table.
22	293	10	Valdez-Cordova	Dams and Reservoirs in table.
1	21	0	Kusilvak	Dams in table; Reservoirs Done
8	60	5	Wrangell-Petersburg	Dams and Reservoirs in table.
0	26	0	Yakutat	Dams and Reservoirs Done
2	513	0	Yukon-Koyukuk	Dams in table; Reservoirs Done
167	3197	67	TOTALS	

D: Mat-Su Drainage basin maps available.

== See also ==
- List of dam removals in Alaska
- List of islands of Alaska
- List of rivers of Alaska
- List of lakes of Alaska
- List of waterfalls of Alaska
