= Andrew Lake (Alaska) =

Lake in the state of Alaska, United States

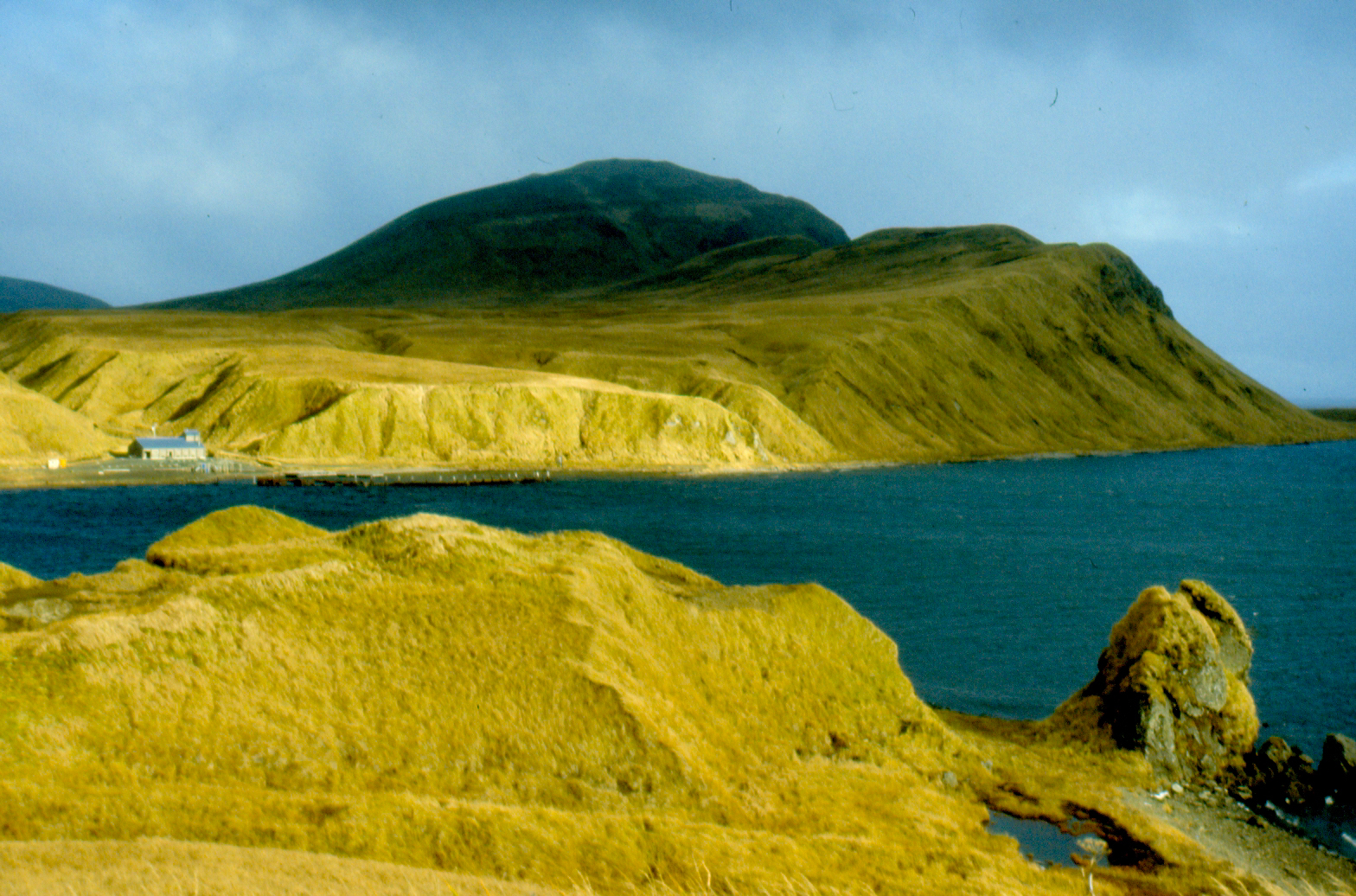

- Location within Alaska Location within North America
- Location: Adak Island, Aleutian Islands, Alaska
- Coordinates: 51°56′31″N 176°38′17″W
- Basin countries: United States

Andrew Lake is a lake on Adak Island, part of the Aleutian Islands, Alaska. It is a part of the Adak Naval Air Station and lies between Mount Adagdak and Mount Moffett. The lake is separated from the Bering Sea by a seawall.

== See also ==
- List of lakes in Alaska
