= Negukthlik River =

Coordinates: 58°54′56″N 160°09′49″W

Negukthlik River is a river located in Alaska. Its mouth touches Togiak Bay.
