= Johnson Lake (Kenai Peninsula Borough, Alaska) =

Lake in Alaska, United States

- Location in Alaska, United States & North America Johnson Lake (North America)
- Location: Kenai Peninsula Borough, Alaska
- Coordinates: 60°17′46.4″N 151°15′54.2″W
- Surface area: 34.4 ha (85 acres)
- Average depth: 3.1 m (10 ft)
- Max. depth: 4.6 m (15 ft)
- Water volume: 1,062,028 m^{3} (37,505,200 ft^{3})
- Shore length^{1}: 3.9 km (2.4 mi)
- Surface elevation: 60 m (200 ft)
- ^{1} Shore length is not a well-defined measure.

Johnson Lake is a small lake on the Kenai Peninsula in the state of Alaska. It covers about 84 acres and is stocked with Pacific salmon, coho salmon, steelhead, and rainbow trout.

The lake is surrounded by Johnson Lake State Recreation Area, which consists of 332 wooded acres (134 ha) with a large campground, picnic areas, and access to the Tustumena Lake road, which ends at the Slackwater boat launch on the river with a small, free campground. Camping, fishing, canoeing and walking are popular activities in the recreation area. There are 48 campsites, 16 day use parking sites, and a group picnic area. Moose, black and brown bear, lynx, squirrels, and hares are plentiful.

== See also ==
- List of lakes of Alaska
