= List of dam removals in Alaska =

This is a list of dams in Alaska that have been removed as physical impediments to free-flowing rivers or streams.

== Completed removals ==
Dam	Height	Year removed	Location	Watercourse	Watershed
Unnamed (Bridle Path Dam)	6 ft (1.8 m)	2004		Allison Creek	
Lower Eklutna River Dam	70 ft (21 m)	2017	Anchorage; 61.4494°N 149.3239°W	Eklutna River	Knik Arm
Bettinger Lower Reservoir Dam B			Kodiak; 57.8017°N 152.395°W		Waters around Kodiak Island
Lake Bettinger Complex Dam	36 ft (11 m)		Kodiak; 57.8033°N 152.395°W		Waters around Kodiak Island
City of Kake Dam		2000	Kake; 56.9815°N 133.931°W	Gunnuk Creek	Keku Strait
Switzer One Dam	15 ft (4.6 m)	1988	Tongass National Forest, Juneau	Switzer Creek	Gastineau Channel
Switzer Two Dam	15 ft (4.6 m)	1988	Tongass National Forest, Juneau; 58.365°N 134.5°W	Switzer Creek	Gastineau Channel
Memory Estates Dam #1			Matanuska-Susitna Borough; 62.6183°N 149.427°W	Tributary to Chunilna Creek	Talkeetna River
Memory Estates Dam #2			Matanuska-Susitna Borough; 62.6267°N 149.38°W	Tributary to Chunilna Creek	Talkeetna River
Davidson Ditch Diversion Dam		2002	Fairbanks North Star Borough; 65.2928°N 146.404°W	Chatanika River	Tolovana River
