= Togiak Lake =

Lake in the state of Alaska, United States

- Location within Alaska Location within North America
- Location: Dillingham Census Area, Alaska, United States
- Coordinates: 59°38′2″N 159°36′28″W
- Primary inflows: Izavieknik River
- Basin countries: United States
- Max. length: 13 miles (21 km)
- Surface elevation: 220 feet (67 m)

Little Togiak Lake
- Location within Alaska Location within North America
- Location: Dillingham Census Area, Alaska, United States
- Coordinates: 59°34′32″N 159°8′58″W
- Basin countries: United States
- Max. length: 6 miles (9.7 km)
- Surface elevation: 39 feet (12 m)

Upper Togiak Lake
- Location within Alaska Location within North America
- Location: Dillingham Census Area, Alaska, United States
- Coordinates: 59°50′13″N 159°28′34″W
- Basin countries: United States
- Max. length: 5 miles (8.0 km)
- Surface elevation: 302 feet (92 m)

West Togiak Lake
- Location within Alaska Location within North America
- Location: Dillingham Census Area, Alaska, United States
- Coordinates: 59°38′37″N 159°38′22″W
- Basin countries: United States
- Surface elevation: 230 feet (70 m)

Togiak Lake is a 13-mile (21 km) lake in the U.S. state of Alaska, which extends South-West from mouth of Izavieknik River, 75 miles (121 km) northeast of Goodnews Bay, Kilbuck-Kuskokwim Mountains.

== Little Togiak Lake ==
Little Togiak Lake extends southeast to Lake Nerka, 22 miles (35 km) east of Togiak Lake and 96 miles (154 km) northeast of Goodnews, Kilbuck-Kuskokwim Mountains.

== Upper Togiak Lake ==
Upper Togiak Lake in Izavieknik River, 7 miles (11 km) northeast of Togiak Lake and 90 miles (140 km) northeast of Goodnews, KilbuckKuskokwim Mountains.

== See also ==
- List of lakes of Alaska
