= Mud Lake (Alaska) =

Lake in the state of Alaska, United States

There are several lakes named Mud Lake within the U.S. state of Alaska.

- Tern Lake, also known as Mud Lake, Kenai Peninsula Borough, Alaska. 60°31′53″N 149°32′44″W
- Flat Horn Lake, also known as Mud Lake, Matanuska-Susitna Borough, Alaska. 61°27′42″N 150°25′26″W
- Mirror Lake, also known as Mud Lake, Matanuska-Susitna Borough, Alaska. 61°32′02″N 149°58′54″W
- Mud Lake, Matanuska-Susitna Borough, Alaska. 61°35′52″N 149°20′30″W
- Mud Lake, Matanuska-Susitna Borough, Alaska. 61°35′52″N 149°20′32″W
- Mud Lake, Matanuska-Susitna Borough, Alaska. 61°35′55″N 149°30′00″W
- Mud Lake, Matanuska-Susitna Borough, Alaska. 62°18′56″N 146°43′08″W
- Mud Lake, Copper River Census Area, Alaska. 62°07′49″N 145°55′42″W
- Mud Lake, Yukon-Koyukuk Census Area, Alaska. 66°49′56″N 143°31′35″W
- Mud Lake, Yukon-Koyukuk Census Area, Alaska. 68°06′30″N 145°32′32″W
