= Trapper Lake (Alaska) =

Lake in the state of Alaska, United States

- Location within Alaska Location within North America
- Location: Matanuska-Susitna Borough, Alaska, United States
- Coordinates: 61°59′53″N 150°14′13″W
- Basin countries: United States
- Surface elevation: 190 feet (58 m)

Trapper Lake is a lake in Alaska that lies to the north of Wasilla. It has no road access. The only way to get there is via float plane in the summer or snow machine in the winter. There is no access in the shoulder seasons when the winter trails are gone and there is ice on the lake.

Commercial float plane access includes Arctic Wings leaving from Kashwitna Lake on the Parks Highway, or Willow Air based on Willow Lake. Other options are available from Anchorage and Talkeetna, with increased cost due to longer flight time to the lake. Typically the lake is ice free by Memorial Day weekend, but not always. Final trips in the fall are typically in early October.

Snow machine access opens up in December with early trips possible via the Rabideaux trail head at MP105 until the Susitna river crossing is put in from Susitna Landing at MP82.5 The Mid-Valley Trail Club maintains the trails in the area with connections to Deska Landing trails and the Trapper Creek and Petersville trail system. Main trails heads are at MP105 and the Susitna Landing. The river crossing should always be considered hazardous and made with careful attention to the trail conditions and updates that may be posted on Facebook or available at the Landing. During periods of warm weather and rain, the river can come up quickly flooding the trail or damaging the ice bridges, but even in colder weather, use caution. The river crossing is typically staked until early April. After the river crossing is closes, there is typically another week or two of access from the Rabideaux trail depending on the show conditions and the water at the Rabideaux creek.

Trapper lake is not stocked, but has a good population of pike that invaded the lake in the 1980s following a high flood that allowed the invasive fish to enter the lake and creeks, decimating the native trout and silver salmon run. For a number of years there were reports of massive pike being taken as they gorges on the lakes abundant native fish. Today the pike are typically about 20" and can be caught summer and winter. The lake generally very shallow and has a number of uncharted rocks.
