= Hagemeister Island =

Alaskan island in the Bering Sea

Coordinates: 58.6609°N 160.9330°W

Location in Alaska

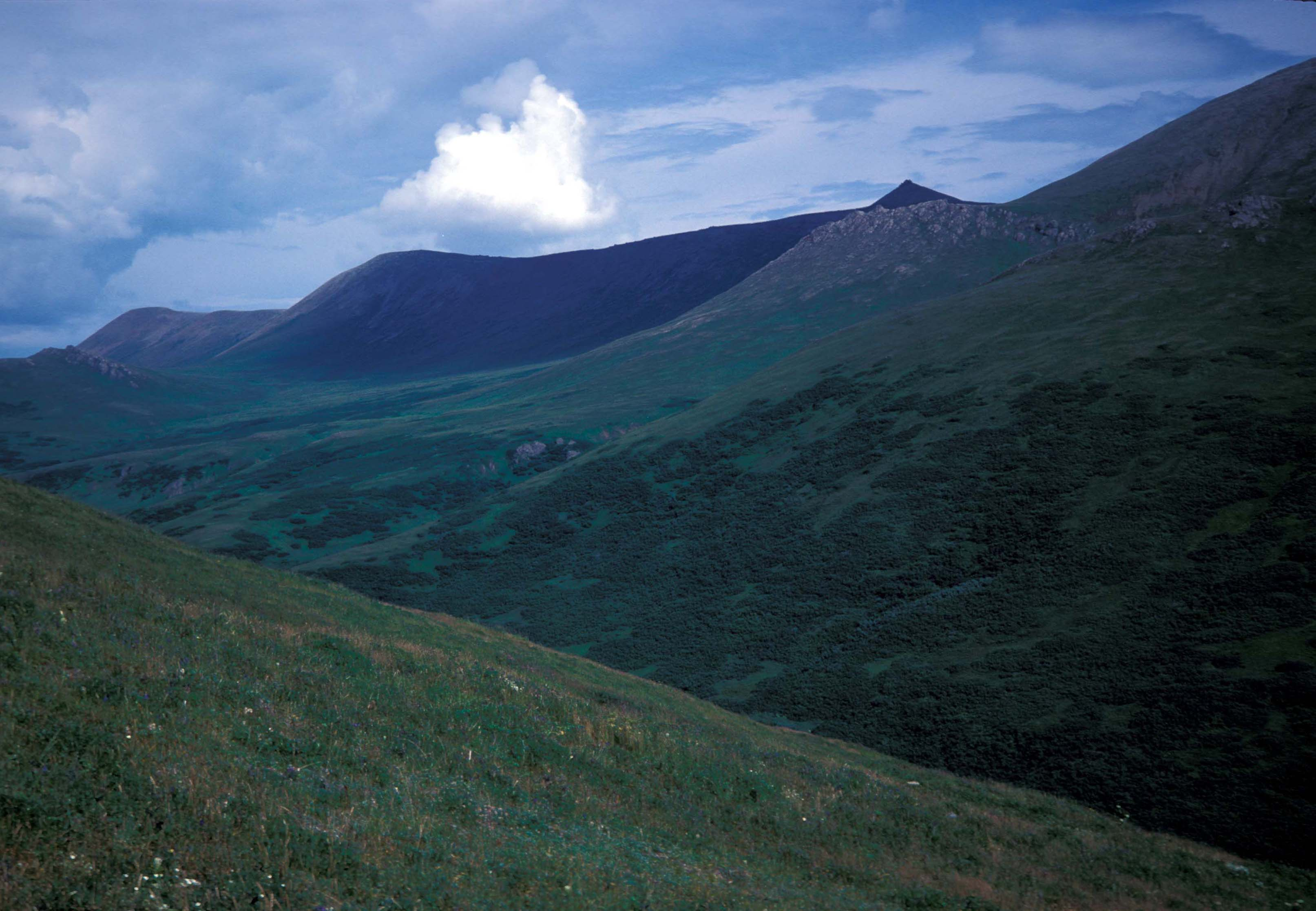
South end of Hagemeister Island

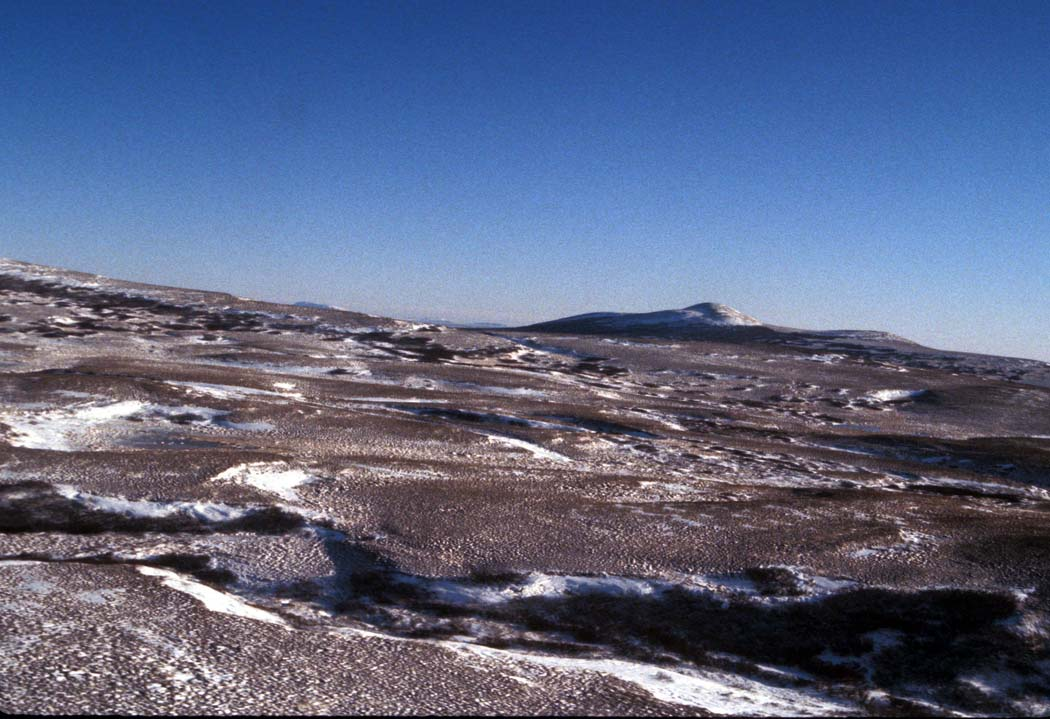
Interior of Hagemeister Island

Hagemeister Island (Russian: Остров Гагемейстера) is an uninhabited island in the U.S. state of Alaska, located on the north shore of Bristol Bay at the entrance to Togiak Bay.

The island is 21 miles (34 km) long, has a land area of 115.9 square miles (300 km^{2}), and its highest point is 1,759 feet (536 m). It has no permanent population at the 2000 United States census.

It is named for Ludwig Karl August von Hagemeister, a Baltic German explorer in Russian service (IRN), who commanded three voyages to Russian America and around the world. On the Neva in 1806–07, on the Kutuzov in 1816–19, and in 1828–30 on the Krothoy. The name was published as "Ostrov Gagemeister" by Lt. Sarichev (1826, map 3).

The island is part of the Bering Sea unit of the Alaska Maritime National Wildlife Refuge.
