= Goodnews Bay, Alaska =

Goodnews Bay Mamterat
- City
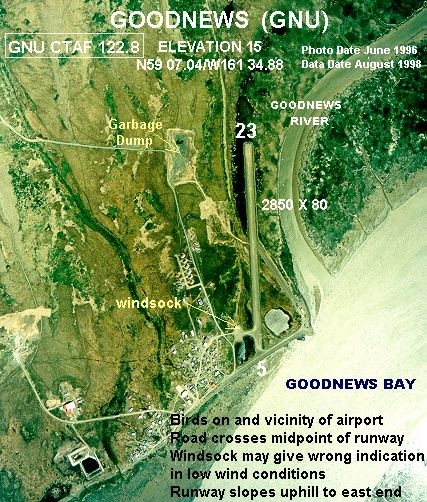
- Aerial photograph of Goodnews Bay

- Location in Alaska
- Coordinates: 59°7′17″N 161°35′9″W
- Country: United States
- State: Alaska
- Census Area: Bethel
- Incorporated: July 9, 1970

Government
  - Mayor: Daniel Schouten
  - State senator: Lyman Hoffman (D)
  - State rep.: Bryce Edgmon (I)

Area
  - Total: 3.33 sq mi (8.63 km^{2})
  - Land: 3.33 sq mi (8.63 km^{2})
  - Water: 0 sq mi (0.00 km^{2})
- Elevation: 26 ft (8 m)

Population (2020)
  - Total: 258
  - Density: 77.4/sq mi (29.88/km^{2})
- Time zone: UTC-9 (Alaska (AKST))
  - Summer (DST): UTC-8 (AKDT)
- ZIP code: 99589
- Area code: 907
- FIPS code: 02-29290
- GNIS feature ID: 1415910

Goodnews Bay (Central Yupik: Mamterat) is a city in Bethel Census Area, Alaska, United States. As of the 2020 census, Goodnews Bay had a population of 258.

== Geography ==
Goodnews Bay is located on the north shore of Goodnews Bay at the mouth of the Goodnews River, at 59°7′17″N 161°35′9″W (59.121408, -161.585835). It is 116 miles (187 km) south of Bethel, 110 miles (180 km) northwest of Dillingham and 400 miles (640 km) west of Anchorage.

According to the United States Census Bureau, the city has a total area of 3.7 square miles (9.6 km^{2}), all of it land.

== History ==
Historical population
Census	Pop.	Note	%±
1880	162		—
1890	162		0.0%
1920	138		—
1940	48		—
1950	100		108.3%
1960	154		54.0%
1970	218		41.6%
1980	168		−22.9%
1990	241		43.5%
2000	230		−4.6%
2010	243		5.7%
2020	258		6.2%
U.S. Decennial Census

Goodnews Bay first reported on the 1880 U.S. Census as the unincorporated Yup'ik Alaskan Native village of "Imagpiguak," with 162 residents (all Yup'ik). It reported on the 1890 census as "Imagpiguak", again returning with an unchanged 162 residents. It next reported in 1920 as "Mamterat." In 1926, platinum was discovered in the region around Goodnews Bay and was mined by the Goodnews Bay Mining Company until 1979. It next reported in 1940 as "Good News Bay." It returned in 1950 as "Mumtrak." From 1960 to 1970, it also returned as Mumtrak with the alternative name of Goodnews Bay. It formally incorporated in 1970 as Goodnews Bay, and has returned as such since 1980.

== Demographics ==
=== 2020 census ===
As of the 2020 census, Goodnews Bay had a population of 258. The median age was 30.4 years. 36.0% of residents were under the age of 18 and 9.3% of residents were 65 years of age or older. For every 100 females there were 113.2 males, and for every 100 females age 18 and over there were 106.2 males age 18 and over.

0.0% of residents lived in urban areas, while 100.0% lived in rural areas.

There were 84 households in Goodnews Bay, of which 54.8% had children under the age of 18 living in them. Of all households, 25.0% were married-couple households, 21.4% were households with a male householder and no spouse or partner present, and 34.5% were households with a female householder and no spouse or partner present. About 15.5% of all households were made up of individuals and 6.0% had someone living alone who was 65 years of age or older.

There were 84 housing units, of which 0.0% were vacant. The homeowner vacancy rate was 0.0% and the rental vacancy rate was 0.0%.

Racial composition as of the 2020 census
Race	Number	Percent
White	13	5.0%
Black or African American	0	0.0%
American Indian and Alaska Native	233	90.3%
Asian	0	0.0%
Native Hawaiian and Other Pacific Islander	0	0.0%
Some other race	0	0.0%
Two or more races	12	4.7%
Hispanic or Latino (of any race)	1	0.4%

=== 2000 census ===
As of the census of 2000, there were 230 people, 71 households, and 47 families residing in the city. The population density was 72.6 inhabitants per square mile (28.0/km^{2}). There were 87 housing units at an average density of 27.5 units per square mile (10.6 units/km^{2}). The racial makeup of the city was 92.61% Native American, 5.65% White and 1.74% from two or more races.

There were 71 households, out of which 45.1% had children under the age of 18 living with them, 31.0% were married couples living together, 23.9% had a female householder with no husband present, and 32.4% were non-families. 32.4% of all households were made up of individuals, and 4.2% had someone living alone who was 65 years of age or older. The average household size was 3.24 and the average family size was 4.04.

In the city, the age distribution of the population shows 36.1% under the age of 18, 10.4% from 18 to 24, 28.3% from 25 to 44, 17.4% from 45 to 64, and 7.8% who were 65 years of age or older. The median age was 31 years. For every 100 females, there were 105.4 males. For every 100 females age 18 and over, there were 122.7 males.

The median income for a household in the city was $16,250, and the median income for a family was $21,563. Males had a median income of $31,250 versus $0 for females. The per capita income for the city was $6,851. About 37.8% of families and 39.0% of the population were below the poverty line, including 53.3% of those under the age of eighteen and none of those 65 or over.

== Education ==
Lower Kuskokwim School District operates the Rocky Mountain School, a PreK-12 school. As of 2021 it has 70 students.

== Health ==
Sale, importation and possession of alcohol are banned in the village. The Yup'ik Alaskan Native people of Goodnews Bay had a hunting and gathering economy in the sub-Arctic environment. Hunting sea mammals, caught birds and fish, picked greens and berries.
