= Eek River =

River in Alaska, United States

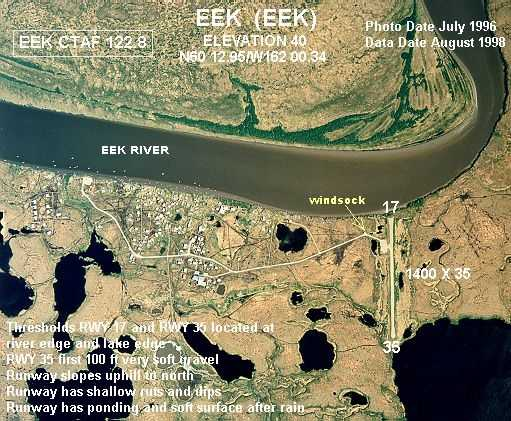

- Location of the mouth of the Eek River in Alaska

Location
- Country: United States
- State: Alaska
- Census Area: Bethel

Physical characteristics
- Source: small lake 0.5 miles (0.8 km) northeast of Mount Oratia
  - location: Togiak National Wildlife Refuge
  - coordinates: 59°56′18″N 160°00′01″W
  - elevation: 2,778 ft (847 m)
- Mouth: Eek Channel, Kuskokwim River
  - location: 45 miles (72 km) southwest of Bethel, Yukon Delta National Wildlife Refuge
  - coordinates: 60°05′07″N 162°18′28″W
  - elevation: 0 ft (0 m)
- Length: 108 mi (174 km)

The Eek River (/iːk/) is a 108-mile (174 km) tributary of the Kuskokwim River in the U.S. state of Alaska. It is south of the Kwethluk River and north of the Kanektok River, which also drain into the Kuskokwim or Kuskokwim Bay on the Bering Sea.

Beginning at a small lake near Mount Oratia in the Togiak National Wildlife Refuge, the Eek River flows generally northwest into the Yukon Delta National Wildlife Refuge to meet the larger river near Eek Island in western Alaska. The Eek River supports large populations of pink salmon and Arctic char.

== See also ==
- List of rivers of Alaska
