= XS Platinum =

XS Platinum Inc.
- Industry: Mining
- Founded: Wilmington, Delaware, USA (November 6, 2007)
- Founder: Bruce Butcher
- Headquarters: Seattle, USA
- Number of locations: 1424 4th Avenue # 515 Seattle, WA 98101
- Key people: Bruce Butcher (Chairman); Mark Balfour (Executive VP)
- Products: Platinum
- Parent: Xs Platinum Ltd.

XS Platinum Inc., also known as XSP, is a wholly owned subsidiary of XS Platinum Ltd, and was founded in 2007 to be a sustainable mine that would get its platinum from mining waste as opposed to new mining. XSP had a contract with Tiffany & Co. On May 1, 2009, the BLM authorized the disposal of 200,000 cubic yards of processed tailing material as mineral materials from the following mining claims in the vicinity of Platinum, Alaska within the Togiak National Wildlife Refuge. At its beginning, day-to-day operations were to be under the direction of Phil Cash, a metallurgical engineer.

== Equipment ==
In 2009 XS purchased a wash screen which fed the minus material to a multi-jig recovery system. XSP contracted AuVert Ltd to design and construct the processing plant for the Platinum Creek mine, which was installed in 2010. 2010 production was up and 2011 production was down. AuVert claimed they voluntarily shut down the plant in 2011 due to high turbidity from contaminated water leaking into the Salmon River, which exceeded the permit limits. However this appears to be contradicted by the lawsuit filed by the federal government.

== Platinum Creek Mine ==
XS Platinum bought the Platinum Creek Mine in November 2007 for US$50 million, with the remaining installments due by December 2015. XS Platinum defaulted on the loan in 2012. The facility was located on the Salmon River, which is an important habitat for chinook, chum, coho, pink and sockeye salmon. It is unknown how much if any damage is done to the salmon; there were elevated levels of aluminum and copper in the salmon.

During the time the mine was operated, it is estimated that 540,000 ounces of platinum were mined. Operations ceased in 2012; at that time platinum was selling for about $1,400 per ounce.

== Indictment ==
A fisheries biologist flew over the area of the plant in 2011 and noted that the water was murky when it should be clear. That spurred an investigation in which he took 400 photos which showed new mining work with turbid ponds. On January 13, 2013, a 28-page indictment was filed that accused XS Platinum and its three top executives along with two employees of conspiring to violate the federal Clean Water Act along with falsifying compliance reports to the federal government. No one representing the company showed up at the initial federal court hearing in Anchorage. XS Platinum's annual report to state and federal agencies in 2011 showed that there had been no discharges during 2010; they were supposed to be a zero-discharge plant.
