= Reproduction and life cycle of the golden eagle =

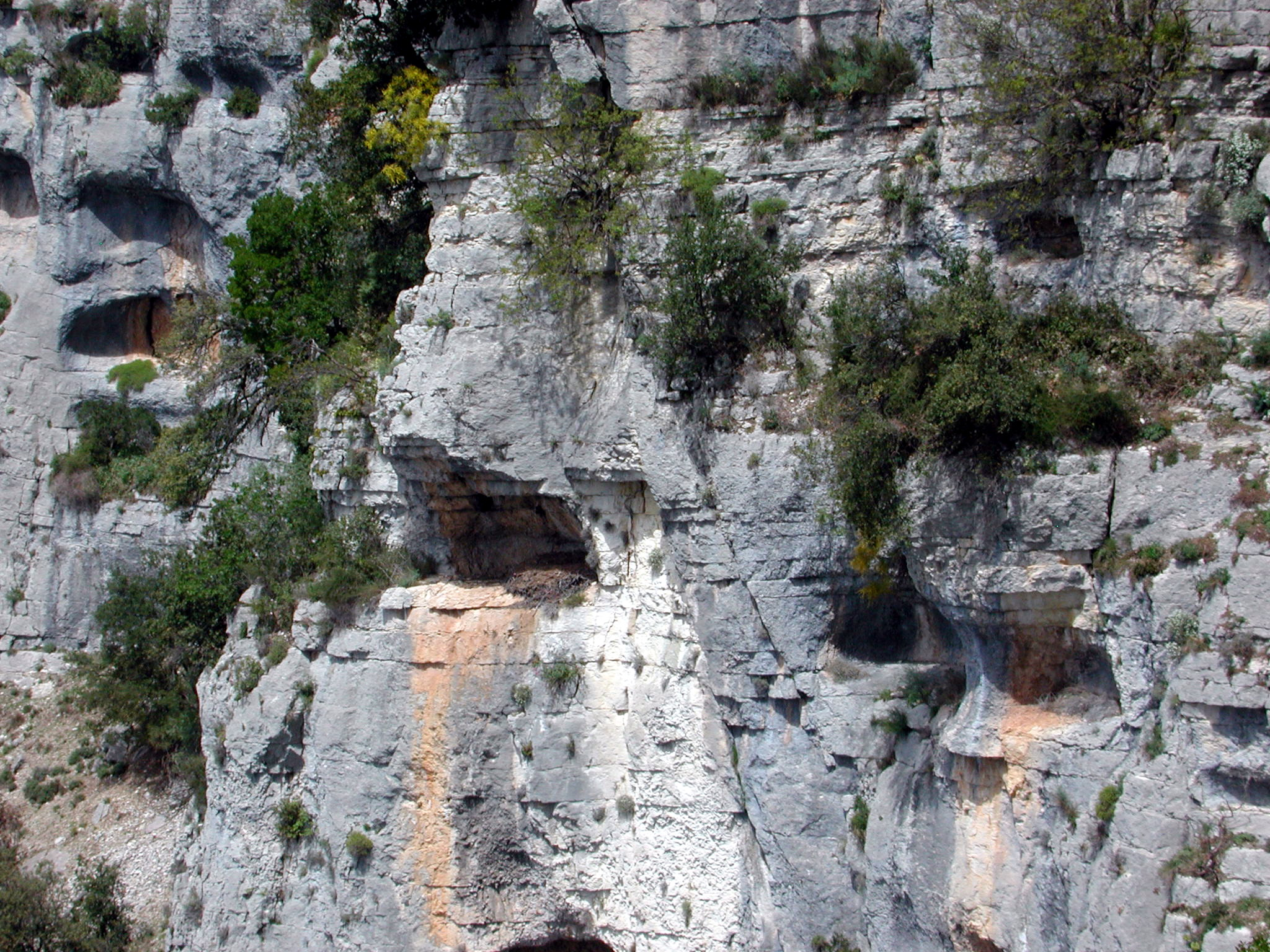
Eyrie (in hollow at left center) in the Valley of the Siagne de la Pare, Alpes-Maritimes, France

Golden eagles usually mate for life. A breeding pair is formed in a courtship display. This courtship includes undulating displays by both in the pair, with the male bird picking up a piece of rock and dropping it only to enter into a steep dive and catch it in mid-air, repeating the maneuver 3 or more times. The female takes a clump of earth and drops and catches it in the same fashion. Small sticks may also be used in this display. Compared to the bald eagle, golden eagles do not repeat courtship displays annually (which is believed to strengthen pair bonds) and rarely engage in talon-locking downward spirals.

Golden eagles typically build several eyries within their territory and use them alternately for several years. Their nesting areas are characterized by the extreme regularity of the nest spacing. In 9 studies of annual nest spacing, the average minimum distance between nests range from 16 km (9.9 mi) apart in Norway to 8 km (5.0 mi) apart in Switzerland. Nests in Scotland may found at anywhere from 10 to 65 pairs per 1,000 km^{2} (390 sq mi), with an average of over 20 pairs found per area.

In much of continental Europe, densities of less than 10 pairs per 1,000 km^{2} (390 sq mi) are typical. In the United States different areas had from 10 to more than 20 pairs on average per 1,000 km^{2} (390 sq mi). Wyoming had the greatest densities of breeding golden eagles of any complied study, though numbers were comparable to western Scotland as there were an average of just over 20 pairs per 1,000 km^{2} (390 sq mi), with greatest estimated densities of possibly 125 per area. In Wyoming, the distance between nests ranged from 3.1 to 8.2 km (1.9 to 5.1 mi), averaging 5.3 km (3.3 mi). In the wooded peatlands of Sweden and Belarus, a maximum of 5 pairs appear to occur per 1,000 km^{2} (390 sq mi). In Quebec, the distance between nests ranged from 8 to 44.7 km (5.0 to 27.8 mi). In the Snake River canyon in Idaho, nests are 5 to 8 km (3.1 to 5.0 mi) apart, while two other nearby studies in Idaho found the average distance were 4.3 km (2.7 mi) and 4.39 km (2.73 mi), respectively. The nesting density for a breeding population near Livermore, California, and the Altamont Pass Wind Farm is among the highest in the world for golden eagles, with at least 44 pairs in 1997, a density of one pair per 19 km (12 mi). Due to the consistency of use by golden eagle pairs, population densities change generally happens only quite gradually.

== Nest requirements ==
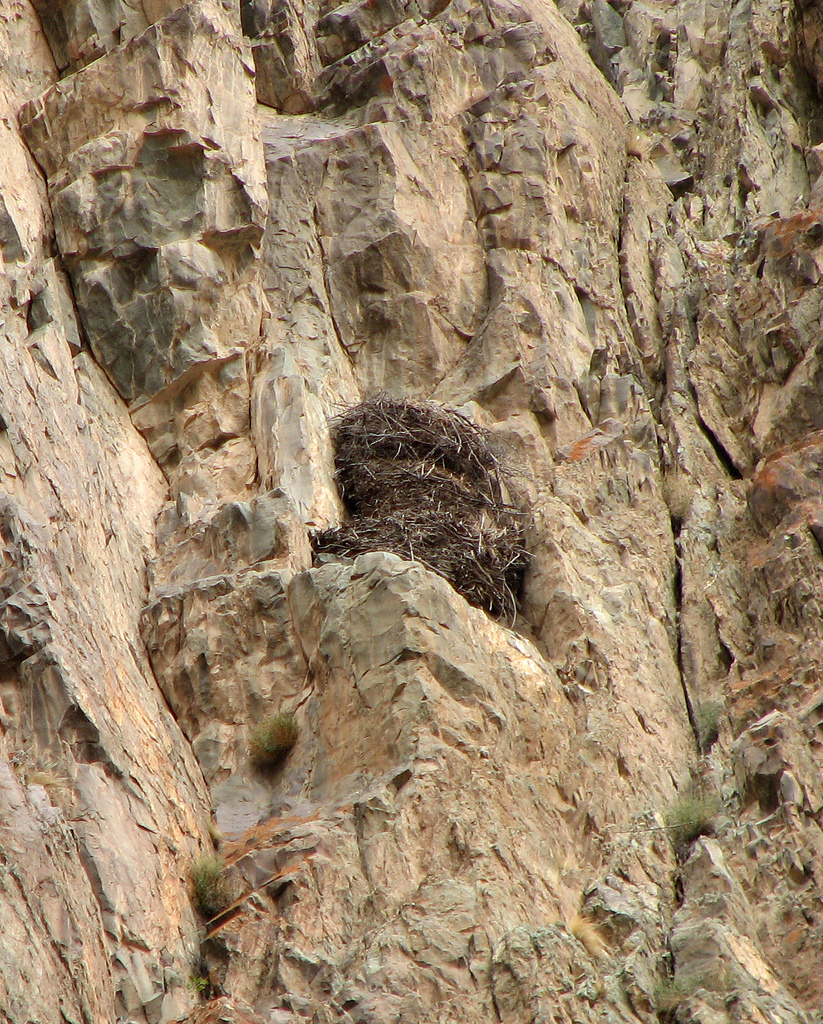
The cliff nest of a golden eagle

Golden eagles seem to prefer to build their nests on cliffs where they are available. Nests are generally located at around half of the maximum elevation of the surrounding land. This height preference may be related to having the ability to transport heavy prey downhill rather than uphill. A massive benefit to cliff nests is that they tend to be largely or entirely inaccessible to mammalian predators on foot (including humans). In Spain, studies revealed the preferred sites of golden eagle nests were on inaccessible cliffs at a great distance from tracks, roads and villages. 95.6% of 410 nests built in Scotland were on cliffs. Similarly, in Bulgaria, Italy, Switzerland, France and Yugoslavia, more than 90% of golden eagles nests were located on cliffs. Greek nests are mostly on cliff ledges, but in the Evros District, nearly 30% of the population nests on trees, mostly pines. Rural, arid areas of Europe such as the Iberian peninsula, Provence in France and the Apennines in Italy, fire combined with pastoral activity has maintained suitable nesting sites at relatively low elevations. In the Spanish Pyrenees, however, nest were found at up to 1,500 m (4,900 ft) in elevation. 80% of nests in Spain are on rocky cliffs, the remaining 20% being in trees. Rocky, low mountainous areas are used for nesting in Israel. All known nests in Iraq have been on cliffs. In Norway, the mean elevation of nests was 500–600 m (1,600–2,000 ft). Throughout the Baltic States and eastern Fennoscandia, golden eagles inhabit relatively flat wooded peatlands and, here, the local golden eagles generally nest in trees. Tree nests are known to be used exclusively in Estonia and Belarus. On the island of Gotland in Sweden, the trees holding nests had an average trunk diameter of more than 55 cm (1.80 ft) and an average height of 17.2 m (56 ft) with the nest being located at an average of 11.7 m (38 ft) above the ground. Cliff nests are preferred as nesting sites in most of North America. In Northern California, tree nests were apparently mainly used. In the forested landscape of western Washington, where large clear cut areas having provided suitable hunting habitat, golden eagles almost exclusively nest in Douglas firs (Pseudotsuga menziesii) at forest edge. There, the nest-hosting tree were 38 to 72 m (125 to 236 ft) with the nest being located at a height of 20 to 64 m (66 to 210 ft). In a study of 170 eyries in the state of Wyoming, 111 were on deciduous trees, 36 in ponderosa pines (Pinus ponderosa) and 23 on sides of buttes or bluffs along river. Cottonwood and willow trees dominated the trees selected, averaging 73 cm (2.40 ft) in diameter and 13.4 m (44 ft) in height. In Wyoming, the tree nests are often the tallest tree in a stand and are in a small or isolated woodlot less than 500 m (1,600 ft) away from large clearcuts or fields. Ground nest are rare in Scotland but not uncommon in the United States, especially in arid areas of states such as Nevada, North Dakota and Wyoming. Ground nests typically occur on lofty hills which have little ground vegetation and require adults to have a good protective all-around view. Other exceptional nest sites known in North America have included river banks, abandoned gold dredges and electrical transmission towers.

Both heavy rain and excessive heat can potentially kill nestlings, so golden eagles often place their nests to suit the local climate. In northern areas, such as Alaska, sun exposure (southern orientation) may help nesting success, while those nesting in hot, lowland Utah and arid regions of Israel were mainly northerly facing to keep the nest out of the hot glare of the sun. Almost all established breeding golden eagles build more than one nest. A typical range of nests per pair is between 2 and 5. In Sweden, pairs on average built 2.4 of them. There is an average of about 4.5 nests per pair in Scotland. In Idaho, there was an average of 6 nests per pair. In more exceptional cases, up to 13 nests have built by a single pair in Scotland and up to 12 by a single pair in Idaho. Some pairs utilize alternate nest sites every year, others apparently rarely use alternate nests. Some golden eagle pairs may not use a nest for up to six years after its construction. Golden eagle nests usually consist of heavy tree branches, upholstered with grass when in use. As is typical of a large accipitrid, the nests of golden eagles are very large. However, they are smaller on average than bald eagle nests. In Kazakhstan, golden eagle nests were similar in size to white-tailed eagle nests. In the Isle of Mull in Scotland, however, white-tailed eagle nests were slightly larger as they used thicker, larger sticks lined with grass that make a more massive nest than the isle's golden eagle nests, which used thinner sticks or heather and lined their nest with woodrush. In Arizona, golden eagle nests averaged 175.7 cm (69.2 in) in length (ranging from 121.9 to 264.2 cm (48.0 to 104.0 in)), 119.8 cm (47.2 in) in width (range of 83.8–203.2 cm (33.0–80.0 in)), and 65.0 cm (25.6 in) in height (range of 12.7–200.7 cm (5.0–79.0 in)). The sticks used in the Arizona nests ranged up to a length of 185.4 cm (73.0 in), a diameter of 5.3 cm (2.1 in) and a weight of 980 g (2.16 lb). Nests in Scotland average 133 cm (52 in) in length, 106 cm (42 in) in width and 79 cm (31 in) in depth. In Washington state, tree nests averaged 90 cm (35 in) in depth and 1.2 to 1.5 m (3.9 to 4.9 ft) in diameter. Nests in Sweden averaged 140 cm (55 in) in length, 140 cm (55 in) in width and 110 cm (43 in) in depth. Nests in Kazakhstan averaged 148.3 cm (58.4 in) in length, 115.7 cm (45.6 in) in diameter and 48 cm (19 in) in depth. The nest of the golden eagle may weigh well over 250 kg (550 lb). As the eagles use a nest repeatedly, they repair their nests whenever necessary and enlarge them during each use. If the eyrie is situated on a tree, supporting tree branches may break because of the weight of the nest. The largest known golden eagle nest, located on a steep river butte along Sun River in Montana, was 6.1 m (20 ft) deep and 2.59 m (8.5 ft) in width. Certain other animals—too small to be of interest to the huge raptor—sometimes use the nest as shelter or even as a nest for themselves, for the incidental protection offered. This has mainly been associated with Eurasian wren (Troglodytes troglodytes) in Europe, though has also been recorded remarkably with ring ouzels (Turdus torquatus) and pine martens, both of which have been recorded as prey for golden eagles elsewhere in Europe. In a similar situation, little curlews in northeastern Siberia apparently gain some protection from predators by nesting close to golden eagle eyries. In each case, the natural predators of these animals are just the right size for golden eagle prey, and therefore avoid active eyries. Related species such as eastern imperial and Bonelli’s eagles have been observed to nest in abandoned golden eagle nests, as well as distantly related or unrelated raptors including white-tailed eagles, lammergeiers, gyrfalcons and peregrine falcons.

== Mating and egg-laying ==
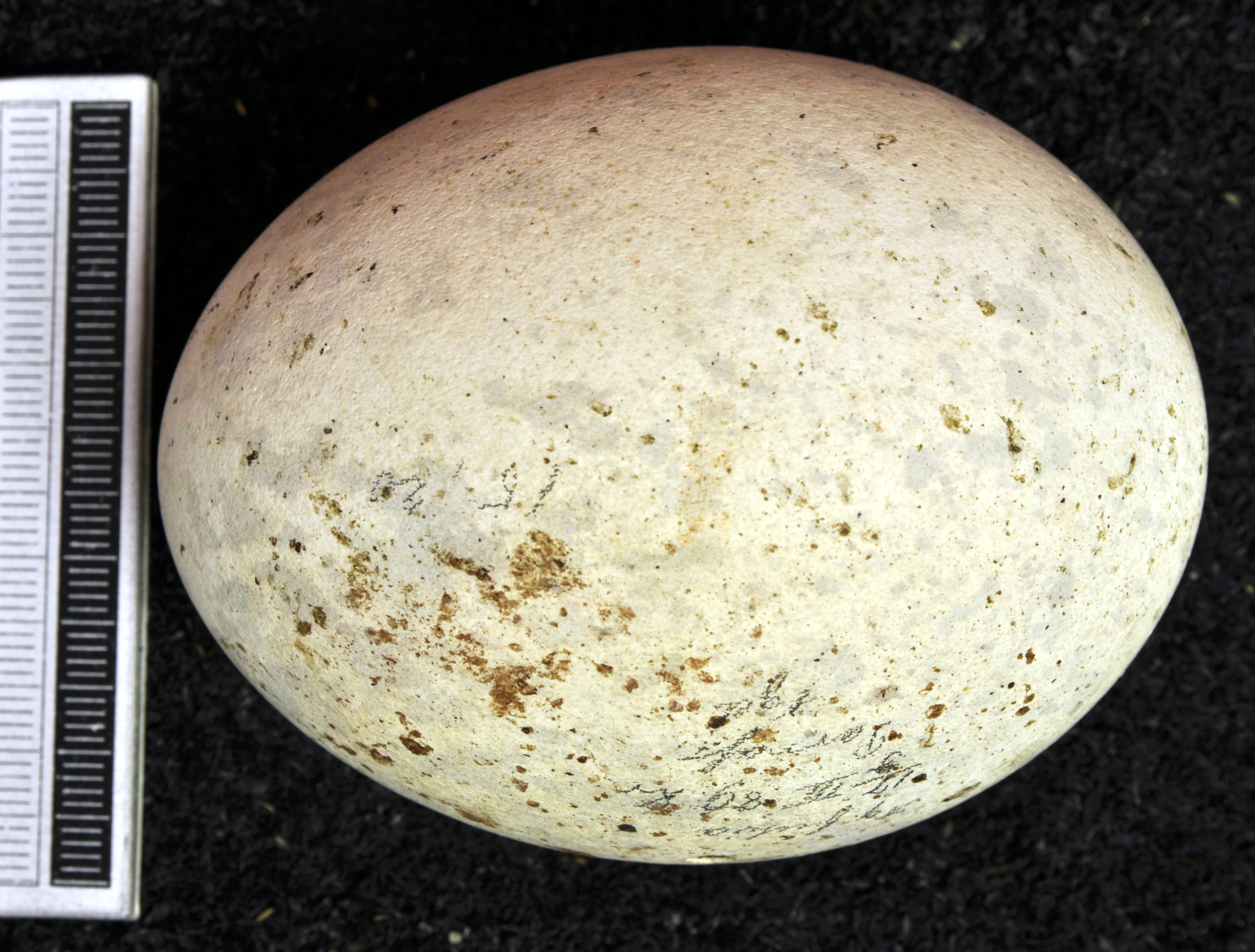
Egg, Collection Museum Wiesbaden

Mating and egg-laying timing for golden eagle is variable depending on the locality. Copulation normally lasts 10–20 seconds. Mating seems to occur around 40–46 days before the initial egg-laying. Unusual mating systems of three birds have been recorded in Scotland and Sweden, usually the third being an immature of either sex. These may simply reflect a relatively unstable period of population adjustment. Occasionally, pairs have been recorded copulating outside of the context of fertilization, possibly for pair maintenance and displacement activity. In Japan, a pair was seen mating 46 days before egg laying and in the United States 55 days after egg-laying. The date of egg laying has been directly correlated by the latitude where the pair lives. In the U.S., egg laying can be from anywhere between January and September, though is usually in March or later. In Scotland, egg-laying occurs in March to mid-April. The earliest median laying date in 25 international studies was December 3 in Oman; the latest median date of egg-laying was May 7 in sub-Arctic Alaska. Egg laying starts in the dry season as early as late November around Mali and Niger while the median egg laying date in southwestern Morocco is January 15. In Ethiopia, the estimated range of egg-laying dates ranged from October 24 to January 5. The median egg laying day in Arctic Russia was May 1. In the Kilbuck and Ahklun Mountains area, three pairs had eggs hatched from May 14 to 23, and young fledged from July 8 to August 10 with a median date of July 23 for 11 nests. Two nests on the Kisaralik River still contained young on July 24, and four nests contained young from 16 to 21 July. Clutches have been recorded range in size from 1 to 4 eggs, though two is the norm around the range. Records of single egg clutches are fairly common in Europe, with 3 being rare there but seemingly more common in North America, where up to 12% of clutches include 3 eggs. A 4 egg clutch is considered exceptional. The lowest mean clutch size known from surveys is 1.82 eggs in the Altai Mountains of Russia. A mean of 48 clutches from Algeria and Tunisia showed an average of 1.89 eggs per nests, with a range of 1 to 3. The female laid an average number of eggs of 1.99 in 332 clutches from 8 studies in 5 of the Western United States. The largest mean clutch size across the range was 2.1 in Montana. In the wild, eggs are typically laid at 3 to 5 day intervals, with records in captivity of intervals of up to 7 or 10 days. The eggs vary from all white to white with cinnamon or brown spots and blotches. Scottish eggs averaged 75 by 59 mm (3.0 by 2.3 in) in size and weigh about 145 g (5.1 oz). In Armenia, the average egg measured 76.5 by 59.1 mm (3.01 by 2.33 in) and weighed 123 g (4.3 oz). In North America, eggs average 74.5 by 58 mm (2.93 by 2.28 in), with a range of lengths from 67.5 to 85.7 mm (2.66 to 3.37 in) and a range of width of 49.4 to 63.2 mm (1.94 to 2.49 in). Eggs of golden eagles in California weighed from 113.9 to 176.6 g (4.02 to 6.23 oz), averaging 141.4 g (4.99 oz). The incubation period lasts from 41 to 45 days, averaging about 42.4 days, with previously reported claims of as low as 33 days from North America now known to be erroneous. Females do a majority of, but not all, of the incubating and largely attain their own food up to the stage of egg-laying, after which they are typically fed by the male. The female may continue to grab most of their own food in areas where carrion is easily accessible. If made to forage excessively during the incubation stage by a non-attentive mate, the female may abandon the nesting attempt. In Idaho, the female did 84% of the incubation during the day, with the male doing about 16%. At night, the female generally appears to do all of the incubating. In Japan, the female did 90% of the observed incubating.

== Early life ==
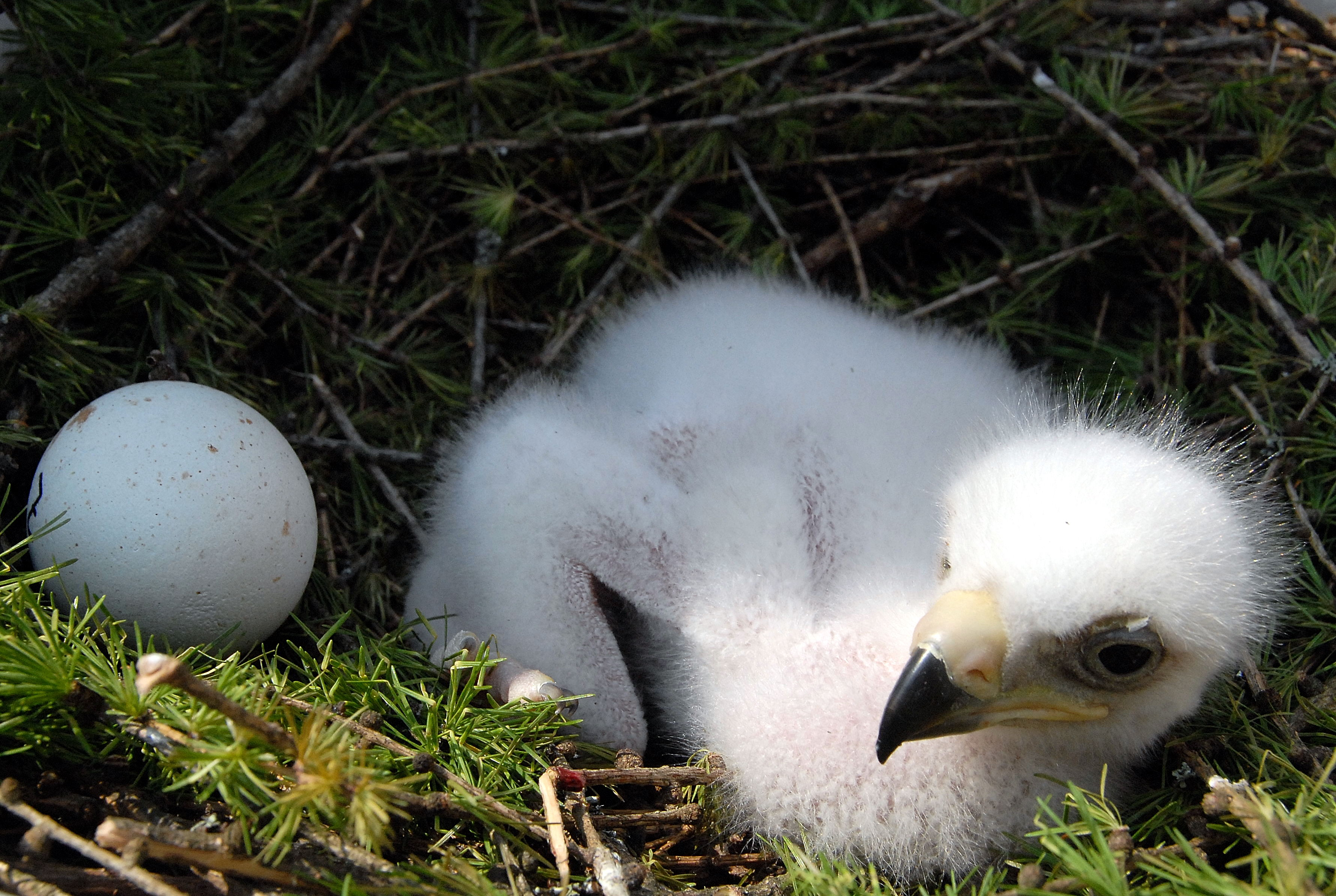
A few day-old golden eagle nestling with its unhatched sibling's egg

The golden eagle chick may be heard from within the egg 15 hours before it begins hatching. After the first chip is broken off of the egg, there is no activity for around 27 hours. After this period, the hatching activity accelerates and the shell is broken apart in 35 hours. The chick is completely free in 37 hours. Upon hatching, the chicks are covered in fluffy white down. One day after hatching, chicks will weigh 105 to 115 g (3.7 to 4.1 oz), with an average of 110.6 g (3.90 oz). In the first 10 days, chicks mainly lie down on the nest substrate. The eagles are capable of preening on their second day but are continually thermoregulated via brooding by their parents until around 20 days. Within 10 days, the hatchlings grow considerably, weighing around 500 g (1.1 lb). Around this age, they also start sitting up more. Around 20 days of age, the chicks generally start standing, which becomes the main position over the course of the next 40 days. The whitish down continues until around 25 days of age, at which point it is gradually replaced by dark contour feathers that eclipse the down and the birds attain a general piebald appearance. After hatching, 80% of food items and 90% of food biomass is captured and brought to the nest by the adult male. The adult male golden eagle perch away from the nest for about 74% of the nestling period, whereas females mainly stay on the nest for about 45 days after the first chick hatches. The voice of nestlings advances from a soft chirp to a disyllabic seeir at around 15 days of age and then to a louder, clearer and conspicuously harsher psaa call given from about 20 days of age to as late as several weeks after fledging. From 10 days to 45 days of age, the nestlings eat much more food and grow considerably. Meal size increases throughout the nesting season, the estimated morsel of flesh fed to the young ranged from 6 mm (0.24 in) at hatching to 15 mm (0.59 in) at fledging. The nestling golden eagles start “mantling” over food at around 10–20 days old: when given a food object, they stand over it, wings partially open, tail fanned and head bowed, covering the food item completely. This is believed to be a competitive behavior as it is seen only in nests with more than one chick. Within a matter of days, the chicks try to defecate over the edge of the nest but are not competent at it until they are around 20 days old. The average daily food consumption for female nestlings tends to be greater than those in male nestlings. The average food consumption of the nestling sexes averages 691 g (24.4 oz) and 381 g (13.4 oz) per day, respectively, with male nestlings weighing about 500 to 600 g (1.1 to 1.3 lb) less than the equivalent-aged females. Despite this, males typically tend to develop sooner and fledge more quickly than the females. The average amount of food brought to the nest daily was notably higher in Idaho and Montana, where an average of 1,417 g (3.124 lb) and 1,470 g (3.24 lb) of prey were brought to the nest, respectively, than in Texas, where an average of 885 g (1.951 lb) was brought. For the first 30 days or so, the nestlings are fully dependent on their parents to feed them but after that period, they start standing around the edge of the nest and practice food tearing. When the first chick is an average of 29 days old, the female first start perching off the nest and at 40 days of age, she stops perching on the nest platform. From 50 days onward, dark brown plumage sprouts from the same sockets as the down and plumage changes become more subtle. The feet go from flesh-colored at hatching to grey to black, thence finally to yellow. When they are around 20 days or so old, as the structure of their wing develops, the nestlings start wing flapping and the frequency and intensity of this behavior increases considerably by 40 days old. Fledging occurs at 66 to 75 days of age in Idaho and 70 to 81 days in Scotland.

== Cainism ==
“Cainism”, as it is sometimes called, or siblicide is inarguably the most controversial and confusing aspect of the golden eagles’ reproductive biology. This is the habitual behavior in the nest of the oldest hatchling to attack and usually kill their young siblings. In fact, this behavior is quite common, not only in large accipitirids but also in unrelated raptorial birds such as skuas and owls. Cainism is frequent, even typical in species of the genus Aquila. The traditionally classified genus can be broken down into two groups: facultative cainists (wherein fewer than 90% of known nests do the oldest nestling attack and kill their younger siblings) and obligate cainists (wherein more than 90% of nests do the older kill the younger siblings). The golden eagle is part of the facultative cainists group, along with the wedge-tailed, eastern imperial, steppe and greater spotted eagles. The obligate cainists are two tropical species, the Verreaux's and the tawny eagle, and one temperate-climate-dwelling species, the lesser spotted-eagle. Other Aquila eagles seem to roughly fall into the tropical species being obligate cainists vs temperate species being facultative cainists categories. Sometimes called “biologically wasteful”, this strategy is most commonly explained as useful for the species because it makes the parents' workload manageable even when food is scarce, while providing a reserve chick in case the first-born dies soon after hatching. Golden eagles invest much time and effort in bringing up their young; once able to hunt on their own, most golden eagles survive many years, but mortality even among first-born nestlings is much higher, in particular in the first weeks after hatching. This theory is borne out by the fact that the tropical species which are obligate cainists invariably have a longer average nesting period than species which nest in temperate zones. In southwestern Idaho, sibling aggression occurred in all nests with 2-chick broods observed from blinds, and resulted in 1 death in 3 (43%) of 7 broods. In another study, siblicide accounted for 7% of 41 nestling mortalities in southwestern Idaho. 6 (40%) of 15 nestling losses in nests in Central Europe were from cainism. In Scotland, there may be a weak link between food supply and cainism. On Skye, where carrion and rabbits are quite abundant, the younger sibling survives to fledge in about 20% of nests, whereas in the West-Central Highlands, where food is more scarce, the second sibling fledged in only about 4% of nests. However, many nest where food availability was seemingly much higher than what all nestlings would need for food still experience siblicide. The nestlings hatch in approximate 3- to 5-day intervals. If it is a three-egg clutch, the mean estimated weight of the three hatchlings at the time the final egg hatches is 367 g (12.9 oz), 252 g (8.9 oz) and 98 g (3.5 oz), making the largest chick easily dominant and giving the youngest practically no chance of survival. The oldest golden eagle hatchling may start acting aggressively to its younger sibling(s) as soon as it or they hatch. Within the first two days, this often escalates into “bill-stabbing” wherein the younger sibling is jabbed around their neck or the middle of their body until a gaping, fatal wound is created. If it is not directly killed, the younger sibling may starve to death, which may be an even more common occurrence. It is apparently common for the younger, weaker siblings to stop begging for food after sibling aggression starts and the parent eagles do not feed the nestlings unless they beg. In some cases, the young nestlings are physically forced from the nest entirely by their older sibling. It is possible that cainism is more common when the older hatchling happens to be a female but, in many cases of males hatching first, they are still larger than the younger siblings and often do dominate and kill them whether male or female. In one nest in Idaho and one in Montana, the oldest sibling was reported to eat their younger siblings, the only verified instances of cannibalism in golden eagles. Although the brooding mothers, otherwise famous for the high level of their parental care, is fully aware of the sibling aggression, in no raptorial bird species are they known to intervene when cainism occurs. After the young are about 20 days old, the amount of aggression between siblings (if both survive) decreases and both chicks can usually fledge, though aggression may again increase shortly before fledging.

== Fledging and ensuing years ==
The first attempted flight departure can be abrupt, with the young jumping off and using a series of short, stiff wing-beats to glide downward or being blown out of nest while wing-flapping. The initial flight often includes a short flight on unsteady wings followed by an uncontrolled landing. Young eagles stay within 100 m (330 ft) of the nest in the first few weeks after fledging. They typically have a favored perch where food is brought by the parents and the fledglings only rarely need to take to the wing. 18 to 20 days after first fledging, the young eagles will take their first circling flight but they cannot gain height as efficiently as their parents until approximately 60 days after fledging. Around the time they are 4 months old, the juveniles start to shun the parents attention, even if offered shelter from rain. In Cumbria, young golden eagles were first seen hunting large prey 59 days after fledging and 75 to 85 days after fledging the young were largely independent of parents. In Israel, at 60–70 days old after fledging, the juveniles were still close to nest and quite dependent on parents for food. At the next stage, at around 120 days old, the Israeli juvenile eagles hunting attempts increased and at 160–180 days old they moved further and further away from the nests. The juveniles in Israel first settled over 12 km (7.5 mi) away from the nests. From their first winter until their fourth or fifth winter is the least well-known of the golden eagle’s life. Juveniles disperse widely during their first year, with males remaining closer to the natal area than the more highly exploratory females. In North Dakota, radio-tagged juvenile golden eagles stayed within 5 km (3.1 mi) of the nest for the first 100 days after fledging but then dispersed over 15 km (9.3 mi) in the following 40 days. The study in North Dakota focused on juveniles from six different nests which successfully produced two fledglings and the behavior of the sibling-pairs was surprisingly gregarious as they flew together, perched together and mutually preened for months after independence. In the juvenile stage, most Idaho non-breeders stayed within 100 km (62 mi) of their place of hatching, although some birds distributed more than 1,000 km (620 mi) away from their natal range. The movements of first-year eagles from Denali National Park averaged more than 5,500 km (3,400 mi), with surviving individuals migrating south to western Canada and the Western U.S. in autumn then moving back north to western Yukon and Alaska in spring. In Switzerland, juvenile birds traveled an accumulated range of 2,000 to 15,000 km^{2} (770 to 5,790 sq mi) whereas the adults never left their home ranges of 75 to 191 km^{2} (29 to 74 sq mi). A radio-tagged juvenile in Spain travelled a range of more than 16,000 km^{2} (6,200 sq mi) in its first three years of independence, then ultimately settled in a vacant territory 26 km (16 mi) from its hatching place. There is a handful of records of pairs of sub-adult golden eagles (based on their plumage) nesting, sometimes even successfully producing fledglings. The first attempt of nesting by six banded golden eagles in southwestern Idaho occurred when they were from four to seven years of age, with five years appearing to be the average internationally. Once they attempt to nest for the first time, golden eagles will often return to the vicinity of the natal zone, regularly within 7 to 65 km (4.3 to 40.4 mi) of their original nest site, sometimes attacking and even killing older golden eagles pairs if they occupy the area.

== Reproductive success ==
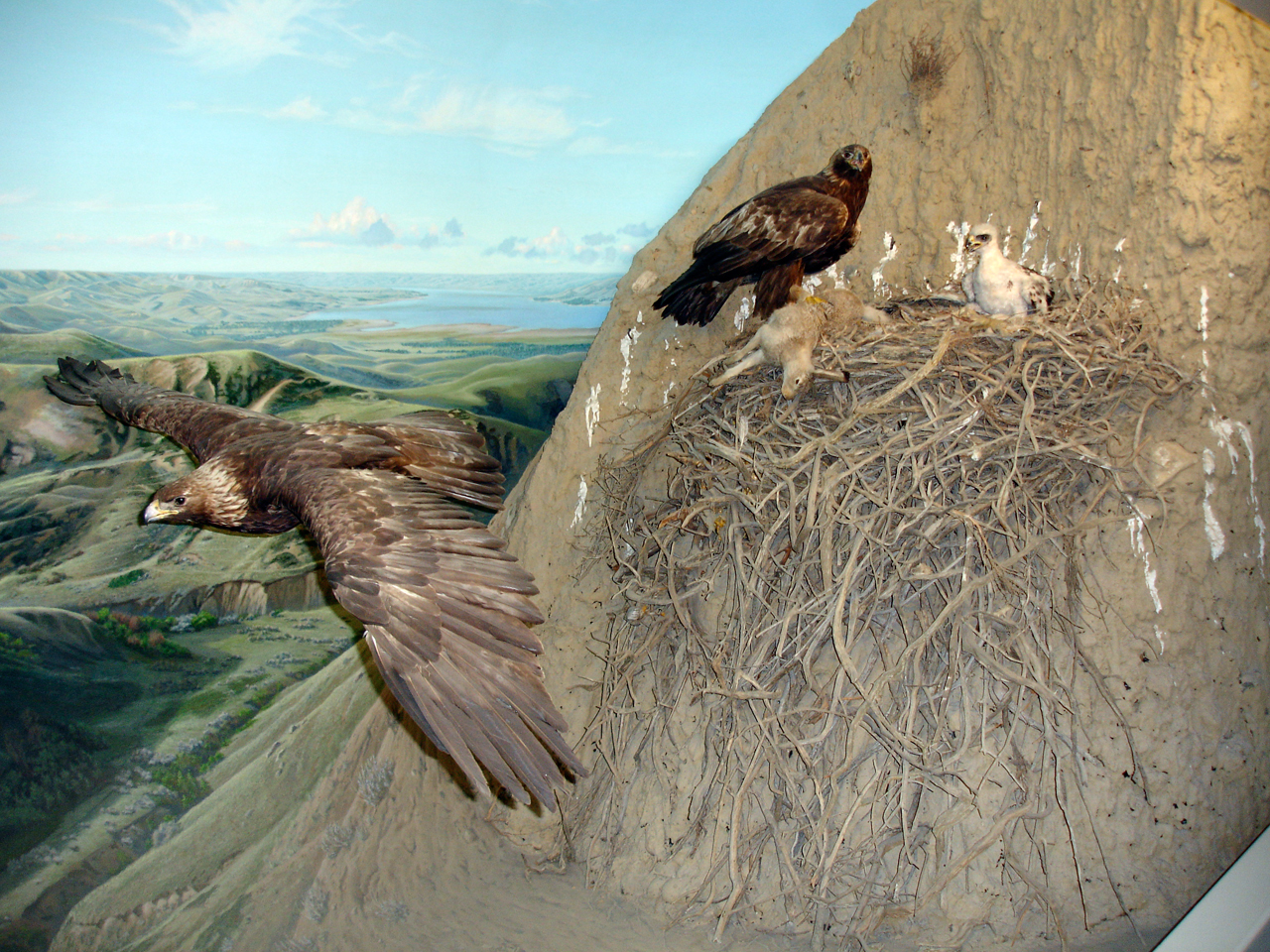
Golden eagle – nest scene reconstitution

Generally breeding success seems to be greatest where prey is available in abundance. In Central Utah, 57% of eggs successfully hatched out of 87 eggs from 44 clutches. In Idaho, 65% of 282 eggs from 145 clutches successfully hatched, and in Montana, 86% of 28 eggs from 14 clutches hatched. In Scotland, the highest breeding success of golden eagles was in the Eastern Highlands where heather moorland still abundant, bearing plentiful red grouse and mountain hare. The jackrabbit follows a 10-year cycle where it peaks and crashes. In Idaho, 100% of observed nests produced at least one fledgling when the jackrabbits peaked in the late 1970s through the early 1980s and then at the low point in the mid to late 1980s, the nests produced on average only 0.2 fledglings. Similarly, in central Utah jackrabbit numbers were correlated with average number of young reared by 16 golden eagle pairs. Here the average number of young ranged from 0.56 in 1967 to 1.06 in 1969 to 0.31 in 1973. In Sweden, nesting success rose noticeably in years where the hunting bag (estimated quantity of prey) rose. After viral hemorrhagic pneumonia (VHP) killed off many rabbits in Spain, the average breeding success of golden eagles in Northern Spain dropped from 0.77 in 1982–1989 to 0.38 by 1990–1992. In Belarus, the average brood size is reportedly 1.8 whereas the average number of fledglings is 1.1. As previously mentioned, adverse weather can affect breeding success. In the exceptionally stormy and cold spring of 1984 in Montana, 71% (10 out of 14) studied nests failed. A long period of exceptionally rainy, cold springs in Scotland reportedly resulted in a 25% reduction of fledging pairs being produced. Rather than directly killing the nestlings, stormy, wet weather probably causes the most harm to productivity due to the hampering of the parents' ability to hunt. In arid areas, heavier rainfall has the opposite effect and actually improves nesting success. Rainy years in the deserts of Israel, which provide more brown hares and chukars to hunt, were more successful years for breeding. While siblicide is estimated to claim about 80% of second hatchlings among golden eagles, in some parts of the range, the survival rate in successful nests is higher. In ideal habitats in North America (Northwestern United States and Alaska), 38 to 56% of nests produce a second fledging. Populations at northern end of range have smaller broods (brood size being about 12% smaller) and produce fewer fledglings (population productivity being about 25% smaller) than those in temperate areas, as has been revealed by contrasting studies of Alaska to Idaho.
