= Kanektok River =

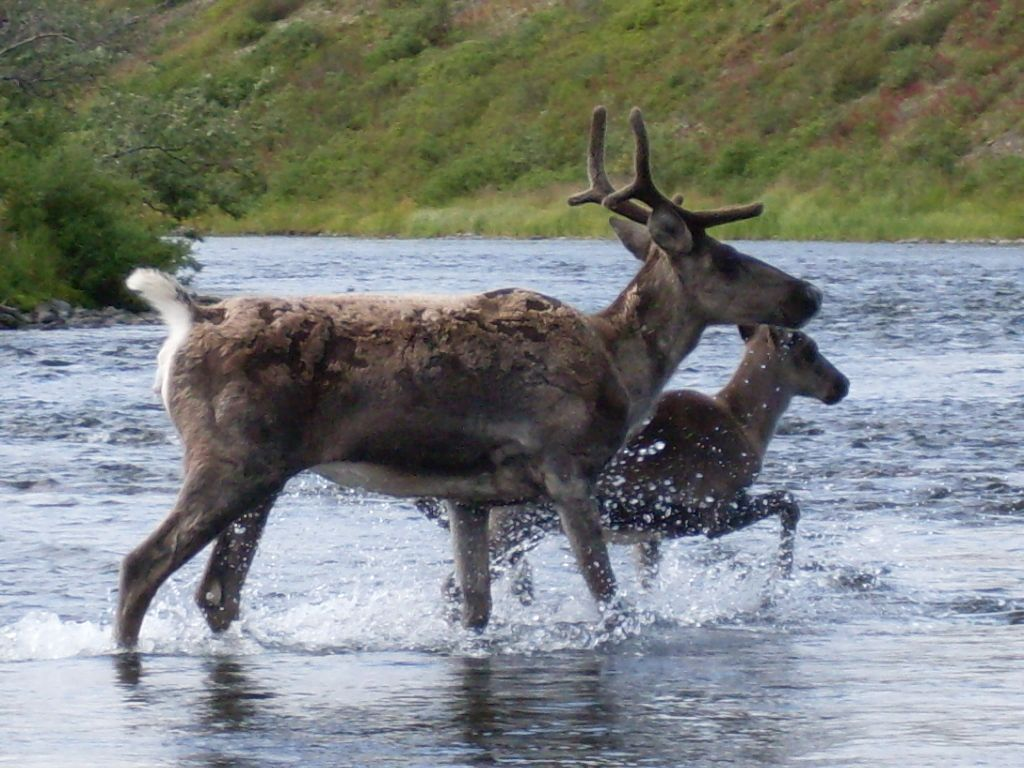
- The Kanektok River flows through the Togiak National Wildlife Refuge.

- Location of the mouth of the Kanektok River in Alaska

Location
- Country: United States
- State: Alaska
- Census Area: Bethel

Physical characteristics
- Source: Kagati Lake
  - location: Togiak National Wildlife Refuge
  - coordinates: 59°52′48″N 160°07′25″W
  - elevation: 1,059 ft (323 m)
- Mouth: Kuskokwim Bay
  - location: 1.5 miles (2.4 km) west of Quinhagak
  - coordinates: 59°44′46″N 161°55′53″W
  - elevation: 0 ft (0 m)
- Length: 75 mi (121 km)
- Basin size: 752 sq mi (1,950 km^{2})

The Kanektok River is a 75-mile (121 km) stream in southwestern Alaska in the United States. Beginning in the Ahklun Mountains at Kagati and Pegati lakes, it flows westward into Kuskokwim Bay on the Bering Sea at the city of Quinhagak. Almost all of the river's course lies within the Togiak National Wildlife Refuge. The Quinhagak Village Corporation owns the land bordering the lowermost 17 miles (27 km) of the river.

== Recreation ==
The Kanektok River, varying from Class I (easy) to II (medium) on the International Scale of River Difficulty, is floatable by many kinds of watercraft. The upper reaches below Kagati Lake are sometimes too shallow for boats. Below this, swift currents, braided channels, logjams, and overhanging or submerged vegetation make the float "not a trip for beginners." In high water, the difficulty along the upper 55 miles (89 km) of the river may increase to Class III (difficult).

Alaska Fishing describes the river as "one of Alaska's most celebrated salmon and trout streams". The main game fish are rainbow trout, char, Arctic grayling, king (Chinook), silver (Coho), chum, and red (sockeye) salmon. Anglers can float down from the headwaters, hire a boat to go upriver from Quinhagak, or fish near tent camps and lodges along the lower river.

== See also ==
- List of rivers of Alaska
- Togiak Wilderness
