= Quinhagak, Alaska =

Quinhagak Kuinerraq
- City
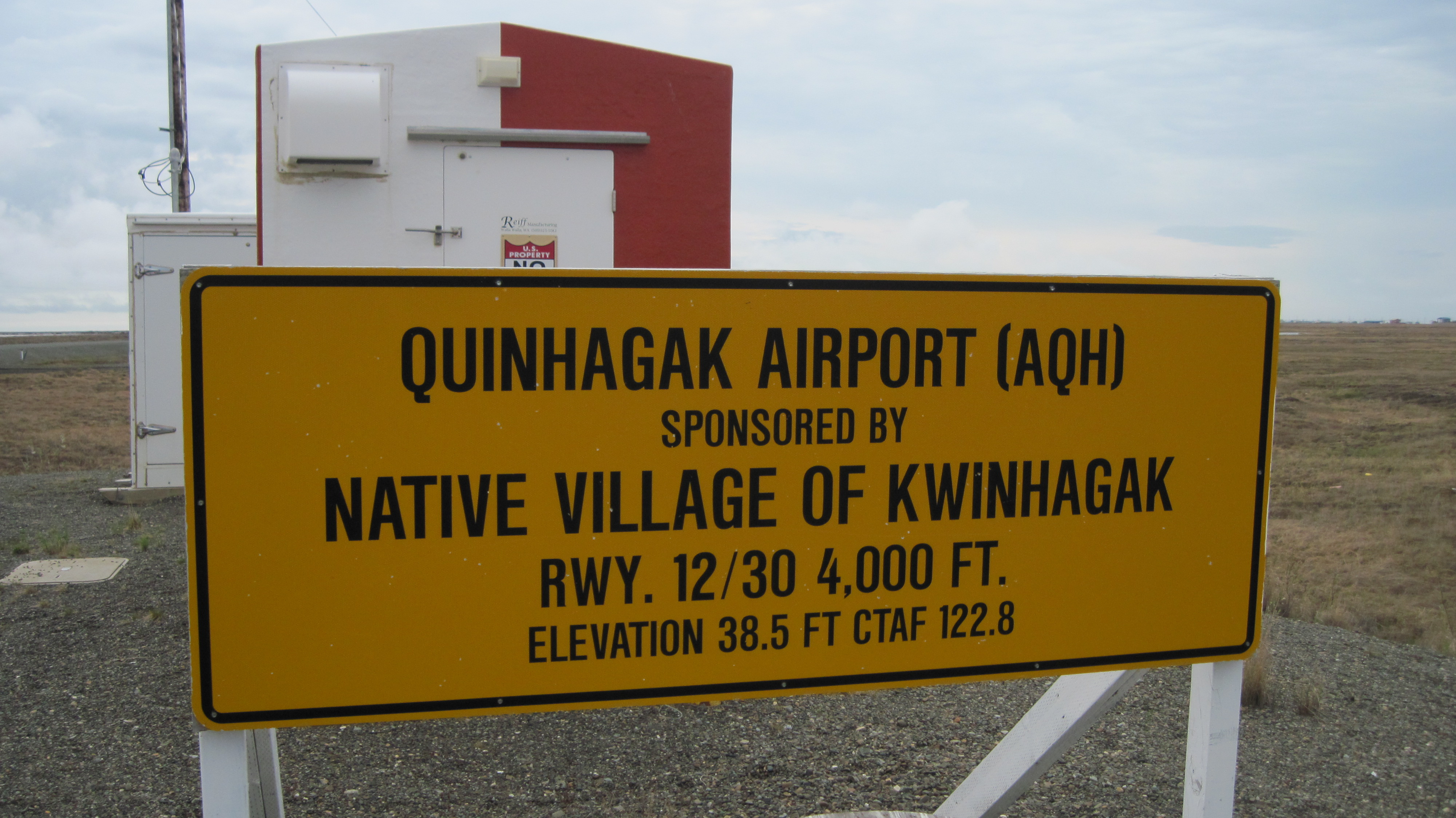
- Quinhagak Airport

- Location within the state of Alaska
- Coordinates: 59°45′12″N 161°54′10″W
- Country: United States
- State: Alaska
- Census Area: Bethel
- Incorporated: February 13, 1975

Government
  - Mayor: Jerilyn Kelly
  - State senator: Lyman Hoffman (D)
  - State rep.: Conrad McCormick (D)

Area
  - Total: 4.69 sq mi (12.14 km^{2})
  - Land: 4.10 sq mi (10.62 km^{2})
  - Water: 0.59 sq mi (1.52 km^{2})
- Elevation: 16 ft (5 m)

Population (2020)
  - Total: 776
  - Density: 189.3/sq mi (73.07/km^{2})
- Time zone: UTC-9 (Alaska (AKST))
  - Summer (DST): UTC-8 (AKDT)
- ZIP code: 99655
- Area code: 907
- FIPS code: 02-64600
- GNIS feature ID: 1408462

Quinhagak (/ˈkwɪnəhɑːk/; Central Yupik: Kuinerraq) is a city in Bethel Census Area, Alaska, United States. It is located in the Yukon-Kuskokwim delta, and remains a predominantly Yup'ik settlement. As of the 2020 census, the population of the city is 776, up from 669 in 2010.

The Yup'ik name for the village is Kuinerraq, meaning "new river channel." It has been dated to at least 1000 AD.

Quinhagak is near the Nunalleq archaeological site, which has "easily the largest collection of pre-contact Yup'ik material anywhere," according to anthropologist Rick Knecht.

== Geography ==
Quinhagak is located at 59°45′12″N 161°54′10″W. It is situated on the Kanektok River and near the Arolik River, approximately a mile from the Kuskokwim Bay of the Bering Sea.

According to the United States Census Bureau, the city has a total area of 5.2 square miles (13 km^{2}), of which, 4.7 square miles (12 km^{2}) of it is land and 0.6 square miles (1.6 km^{2}) of it (10.86%) is water.

== Nunalleq archaeological site ==
In 2009, archaeologists from the University of Aberdeen began collaborating with village residents to excavate a nearby site three miles south known as Nunalleq, meaning "old village" in Yup'ik. The original name of the settlement is unknown but is thought to have burned down sometime around 1650.

The excavation has produced over 100,000 artifacts, dating from 1350 to 1670, forming one of the best collections of pre-contact Yup'ik culture. Items illustrate all aspects of life such as masks, house foundations, oil lamps, spoons, woven baskets, and seal skin boots.

The site along the coastline and is threatened by constant erosion, and the surge of storms and thawing permafrost brought on by climate change also disturb the site. These include many organic artifacts preserved in permafrost. Up to 75% of the original site is thought to have washed away as of 2013, including the original excavation site. In 2025 Typhoon Halong flooded the region, destroyed the digsite, and swept up thousands of artifacts.

In 2018 the Nunalleq Culture and Archaeology Center was opened to process, preserve, and make accessible items found from the site. A "digital museum" of the Nunalleq archaeological site has also been set up.

== Demographics ==
Historical population
Census	Pop.	Note	%±
1880	83		—
1890	109		31.3%
1900	201		84.4%
1910	111		−44.8%
1920	193		73.9%
1930	230		19.2%
1940	224		−2.6%
1950	194		−13.4%
1960	228		17.5%
1970	340		49.1%
1980	412		21.2%
1990	501		21.6%
2000	555		10.8%
2010	669		20.5%
2020	776		16.0%
U.S. Decennial Census

Quinhagak has appeared under six different names on census records over the course of a century. It first appeared on the 1880 U.S. Census as the unincorporated Inuit village of "Quinchahamute." In 1890, it returned as "Quinhaghamiut." In 1900, it returned as "Kwiniak." In 1910, it returned as "Kwinak", with the alternative spelling of "Quinhagak." In 1920 and 1930, it appeared exclusively under its present spelling of Quinhagak. From 1940 to 1970, it was spelled as "Kwinhagak." It was formally incorporated in 1975 with the current spelling of Quinhagak.

=== 2020 census ===
As of the 2020 census, Quinhagak had a population of 776. The median age was 26.9 years. 37.4% of residents were under the age of 18 and 8.9% of residents were 65 years of age or older. For every 100 females there were 110.9 males, and for every 100 females age 18 and over there were 109.5 males age 18 and over.

0.0% of residents lived in urban areas, while 100.0% lived in rural areas.

There were 192 households in Quinhagak, of which 50.5% had children under the age of 18 living in them. Of all households, 35.9% were married-couple households, 27.1% were households with a male householder and no spouse or partner present, and 27.6% were households with a female householder and no spouse or partner present. About 19.3% of all households were made up of individuals and 4.7% had someone living alone who was 65 years of age or older.

There were 204 housing units, of which 5.9% were vacant. The homeowner vacancy rate was 0.0% and the rental vacancy rate was 0.0%.

Racial composition as of the 2020 census
Race	Number	Percent
White	13	1.7%
Black or African American	0	0.0%
American Indian and Alaska Native	731	94.2%
Asian	0	0.0%
Native Hawaiian and Other Pacific Islander	0	0.0%
Some other race	1	0.1%
Two or more races	31	4.0%
Hispanic or Latino (of any race)	3	0.4%

=== 2000 census ===
As of the census of 2000, there were 555 people, 137 households, and 113 families residing in the city. The population density was 118.5 inhabitants per square mile (45.8/km^{2}). There were 153 housing units at an average density of 32.7 units per square mile (12.6 units/km^{2}). The racial makeup of the city was 96.04% Native American, 1.26% from two or more races, and 2.70% White 0.72% of the population were Hispanic or Latino of any race.

There were 137 households, out of which 50.4% had children under the age of 18 living with them, 56.2% were married couples living together, 12.4% had a female householder with no husband present, and 16.8% were non-families. 12.4% of all households were made up of individuals, and 1.5% had someone living alone who was 65 years of age or older. The average household size was 4.05 and the average family size was 4.52.

In the city, the population was spread out, with 37.1% under the age of 18, 9.5% from 18 to 24, 29.5% from 25 to 44, 16.0% from 45 to 64, and 7.7% who were 65 years of age or older. The median age was 27 years. For every 100 females, there were 109.4 males. For every 100 females age 18 and over, there were 115.4 males.

The median income for a household in the city was $25,156, and the median income for a family was $25,313. Males had a median income of $23,750 versus $36,250 for females. The per capita income for the city was $8,127. About 27.2% of families and 26.1% of the population were below the poverty line, including 34.0% of those under age 18 and 25.0% of those age 65 or over.

== Economy ==
The village hosts a commercial fishing industry and fish plant (not operational since the Platinum Fish Processing Plants opening in 2010). Although a commercial fishing village, there has been no commercial fishing since the local processor, Coastal Villages Seafood/Coastal Villages Region Fund, stopped buying salmon since 2016.

Most Quinhagak households practice subsistence hunting and gathering in addition to any wage work they are able to find, utilizing the village's excellent location for salmon and trout fishing, bird, caribou, and moose hunting, and berry picking. Much of the work available is government-funded (through the Lower Kuskokwim School District, which runs the local school, or through the Native Village of Kwinhagak).

Three wind turbines installed in 2010 generate much of the village energy supply.

== Education ==
Lower Kuskokwim School District operates the Kuinerrarmiut Elitnaurviat School, K-12. The school has approximately 220 students enrolled with 37 staff members.
