= Ahklun Mountains =

Mountain range in Alaska, United States

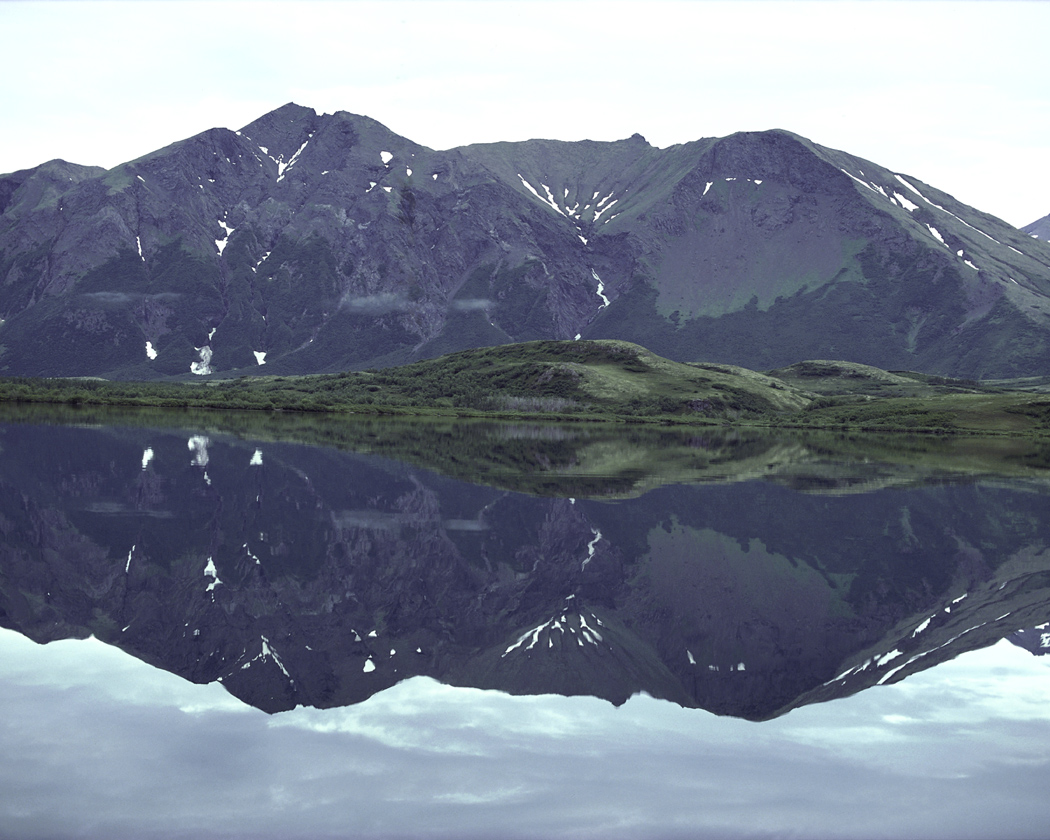
- View of the Ahklun Mountains reflected in a mirror-smooth glacial lake

Highest point
- Elevation: 1204

Dimensions
- Length: 80 mi (130 km)
- Width: 30 mi (48 km)

Geography
- Country: United States
- State: Alaska
- Range coordinates: 59°23′0″N 160°42′0″W
- Parent range: Kuskokwim Mountains

The Ahklun Mountains are located in the northeast section of the Togiak National Wildlife Refuge in southwest Alaska. They extend southwest from the Kanektok and Narogurum Rivers to Hagemeister Strait and Kuskokwim Bay and support the only existing glaciers in western Alaska. They are the highest Alaskan mountain range west of the Alaska Range and north of the Alaska Peninsula: some summits in the range have many glaciers. To the west is the Kuskokwim River and to the east are the Bristol Bay lowlands.

The Ahklun Mountains have many lakes, some more than 1,300 feet (400 m) deep. The mountains cover approximately 80 percent of the Togiak National Wildlife Refuge. The refuge also contains tundra and coastal plains.

== Environment ==
The Ahklun Mountains are dominated by alpine tundra, heath, and barrens, while moist sedge-tussock meadows occur in valley bottoms. Black spruce forest occurs on some hills and ridges. Forests of white spruce, paper birch, and alder cover the low hills along the major rivers. Blackpoll warblers are common breeders in conifer stands in river valleys. Beaver are abundant, supporting a large annual harvest. Sockeye salmon are the most abundant fish. Chum, king, silver salmon, and rainbow trout are also numerous. The average annual precipitation ranges from 19 to 25 inches (480 to 640 mm), while the average annual temperature ranges from 29 to 33 °F (−2 to 1 °C). The growing season extends approximately from May 15 to September 10.

=== Glaciers ===
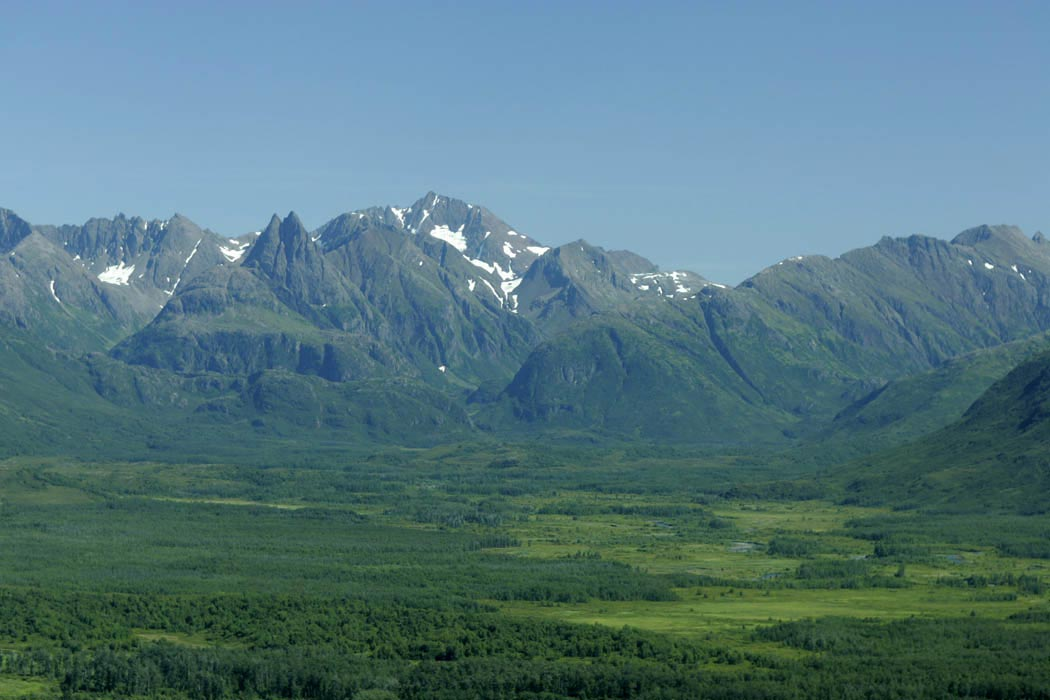
The Ahklun Mountains in the Togiak Wilderness

The glaciers were first mapped by the U.S. Geological Survey, who used photogrammetry methods based on a 1972 series of aerial photos, revealing the presence of 116 glaciers. In 2006, 109 of these glaciers were resurveyed with the existence of 97 verified and 12 thought to have disappeared. This showed that over just three decades there had been a large decrease in the amount of land area covered by glacial ice in these mountains. The scientific community has long recognized the importance of glaciers as indicators of climatic change.

In 2015, researchers analyzed aerial and satellite images from 1957, 1984, and 2009. They found that 10 out of 109 of the glaciers of the Ahklun Mountains originally mapped by the U.S. Geological Survey in the 1970s had completely disappeared. They also compared the size of the glaciers using aerial photographs and satellite images and found that the glaciers had lost about 50 percent of their total area. At this rate of melting, they predict that all of the glaciers in the Ahklun Mountains will be gone by the end of this century.

Geological evidence show that during the Pleistocene era there were repeated glaciations that have carved out a large number of valley troughs. On the eastern side, these troughs contain networks of glacial lakes, some that are over 1,300 feet (400 m) deep and are dammed by terminal moraines. On the southern and western side, the valleys are broader and are interspersed with rolling uplands pierced by rugged massifs.

=== Lowlands ===
In the lowlands, areas not reached by the glaciation, the principal geographic features are the moraines and ridges formed by thrusting ice.
