= Kuskokwim Bay =

Waterbody in Alaska, United States

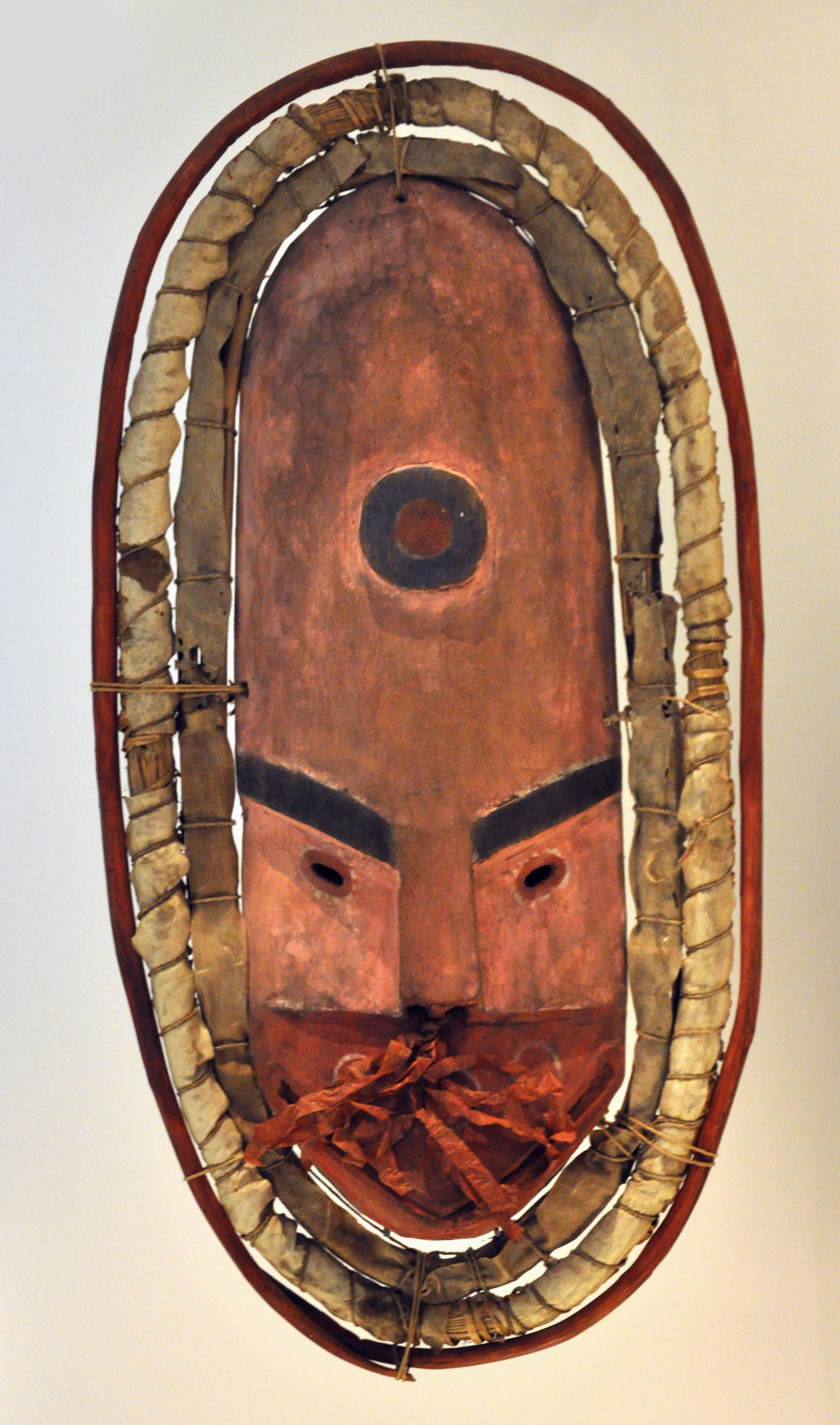
- Mask from Kuskokwim Bay (wood, fur, straw, feather, leaf)

- Location within Alaska
- Location: Alaska, United States
- Coordinates: 59°30′N 162°30′W
- Type: Bay
- Etymology: Kuskokwim River
- River sources: Kuskokwim River
- Max. length: 160 kilometres (99 mi)
- Max. width: 160 kilometres (99 mi)

Kuskokwim Bay is a bay in southwestern Alaska, at about 59°30′N 162°30′W. It is about 160 km (99 mi) long, and 160 km (99 mi) wide. It is named for the Kuskokwim River, which empties into the bay. The largest community on the bay is the city of Quinhagak.

The entire bay is located inside the Nunivak Island, Etolin Strait, and Kuskokwim Bay Habitat Conservation Area, an 8.2 million acre essential fish habitat established in 2008 which prohibits fishing with nonpelagic trawl gear.
