= Togiak National Wildlife Refuge =

- IUCN category IV (habitat/species management area)
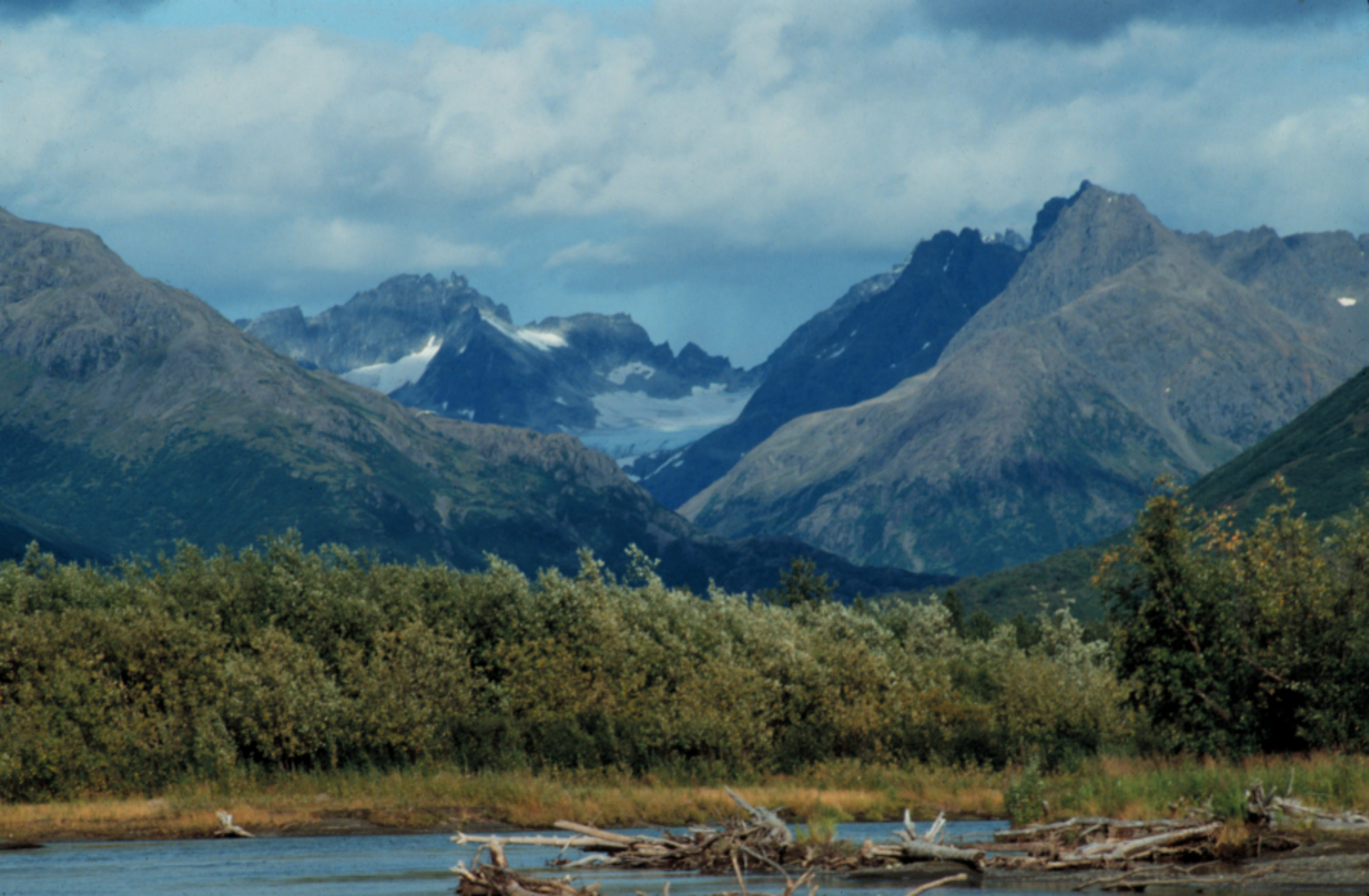
- Ahklun and Wood River Mountains, Togiak National Wildlife Refuge

- Location within Alaska
- Location: Alaska, United States
- Nearest city: Dillingham, Alaska
- Coordinates: 59.333°N 160.250°W
- Area: 4,102,537 acres (16,602.38 km^{2})
- Established: 1980
- Governing body: U.S. Fish and Wildlife Service
- Website: Togiak NWR

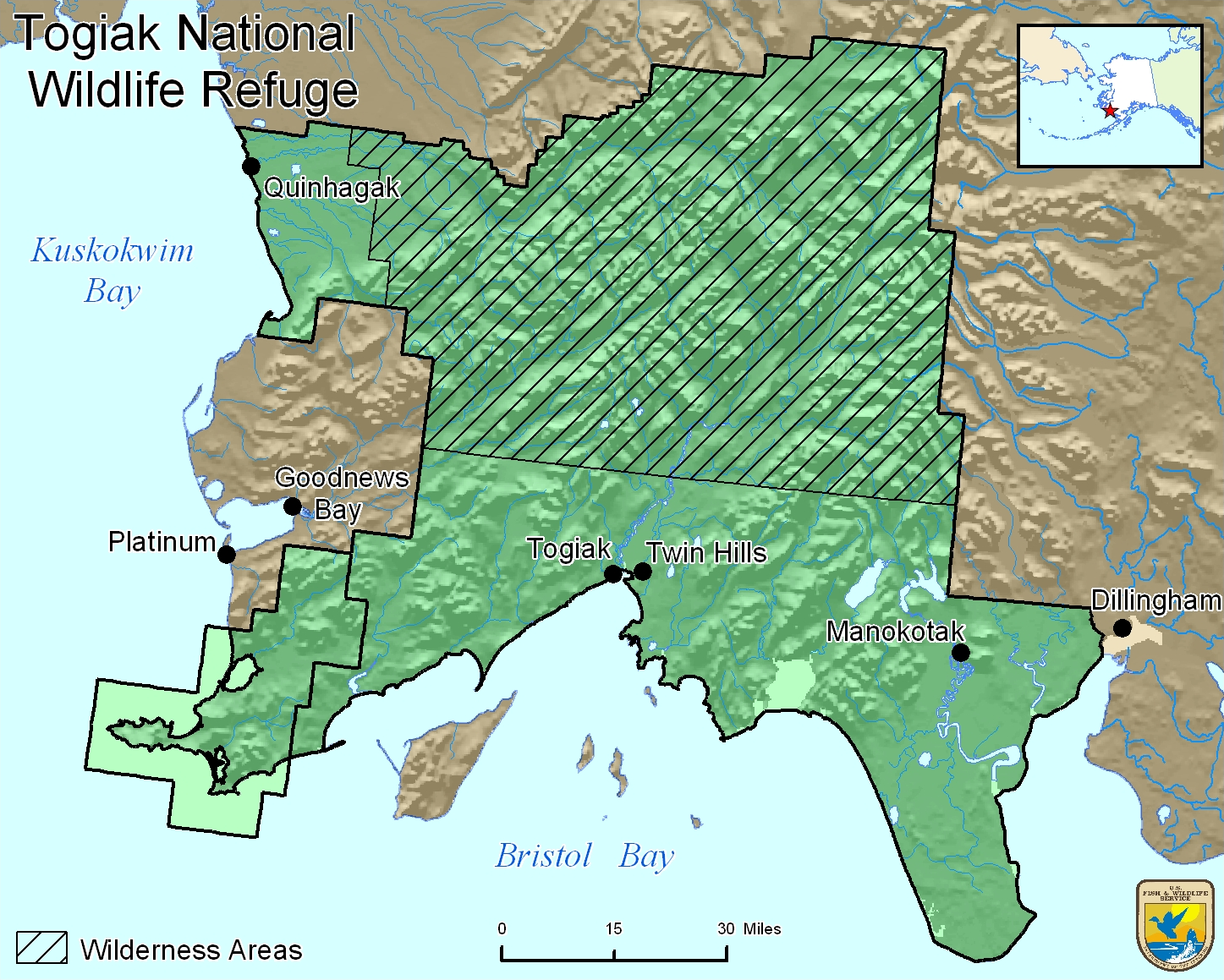
Map of Togiak National Wildlife Refuge

Togiak National Wildlife Refuge is in the Dillingham and Bethel Census Areas, Alaska. It is dominated by the Ahklun Mountains in the north and the cold waters of Bristol Bay to the south. The natural forces that have shaped this land range from the violent and powerful to the geologically patient. Earthquakes and volcanoes filled the former role, and their marks can still be found, but it was the gradual advance and retreat of glacial ice that carved many of the physical features of this refuge.

The refuge has a surface area of 4,102,537 acres (16,602.4 km^{2}). It is the fourth-largest National Wildlife Refuge in the United States as well as the state of Alaska, which has all eleven of the largest NWRs. It is bordered in the southeast by Wood-Tikchik State Park, the largest state park in the United States.

The Togiak Wilderness occupies 2,274,066 acres (920,282 ha) in the northern half of the refuge. It protects pristine rivers, lakes, and steep-sloped mountains, including the rugged Ahklun Mountains and Wood River Range, which are located partly within the wilderness. Parts of the Kanektok, Goodnews, and Togiak drainages are also located within the boundaries of the Togiak Wilderness.

== Wildlife ==
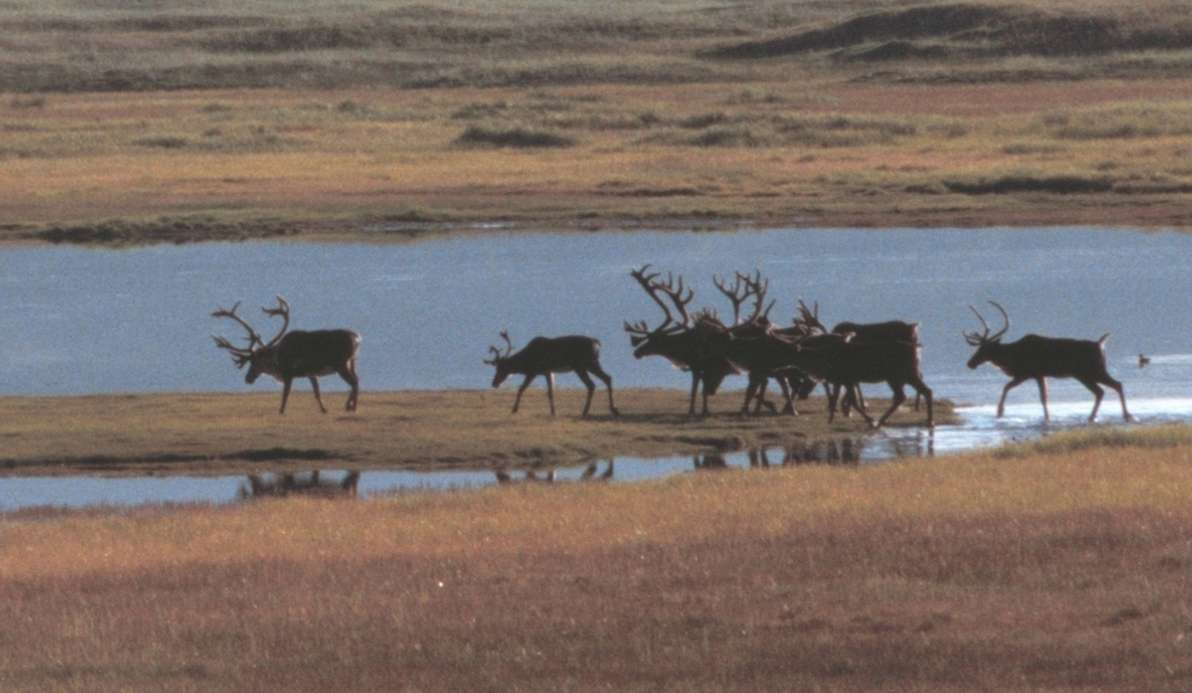
Caribou at the refuge

The refuge is home to 48 mammal species, 31 of which are terrestrial and 17 marine. More than 150,000 caribou from two herds, the Nushagak Peninsula and the Mulchatna, make use of refuge lands, which they share with wolf packs, moose, brown and black bear, coyote, Canadian lynx, Arctic fox, muskrat, wolverine, red fox, marmot, beaver, marten, two species of otter, and porcupine, among other land mammals. Seals, sea lions, walrus and whales are found at various times of year along the refuge's 600 miles (970 km) of coastline.

Within the refuge, the waters produce over 3 million Chinook, sockeye, coho, pink, and chum salmon. Not including the five species of salmon that inhabit the region, there are 27 species found in the waters, including Dolly Varden, Arctic grayling, and rainbow trout. The region's salmon are a primary subsistence source for locals, and provide a very important commercial and recreational fishery.

Some 201 species of birds have been sighted on Togiak Refuge. Threatened species can occasionally be found here, including Steller's and spectacled eiders. Several arctic goose species frequent the refuge, along with murres, seven species of owls, peregrine falcons, dowitchers, Lapland longspurs and a rich variety of other seabirds, waterfowl, shorebirds, songbirds and raptors. Refuge staff and volunteers have also documented more than 500 species of plants, demonstrating a high degree of biodiversity for a sub-arctic area.

== See also ==
- List of largest National Wildlife Refuges
