= List of geographic features on Baranof Island =

The following is a partial list of geographic features on Baranof Island:

== Lakes ==
- Baranof Lake
- Blue Lake
- Camp Lake
- Green Lake
- Indigo Lake
- Medvejie Lake
- Redoubt Lake
- Swan Lake

== Mountains ==
- Peak 5390
- Mount Bassie
- Mount Furuhelm
- Mount Verstovia

== Rivers ==
- Baranof River
- Indian River
