= Baranov (disambiguation) =

Baranov is a Russian surname.

Baranov or Baranof may also refer to:

== Places ==
- Baranof Island
- Baranof Lake
- Baranof River
- Baranof Warm Springs, Alaska
- Cape Baranov, Severnaya Zemlya
- Castle Hill (Sitka, Alaska) (Baranof Castle Hill State Historic Site), Sitka, Alaska

== Other uses ==
- Baranov Central Institute of Aviation Motors development

== See also ==
- Baranow (disambiguation)
