= Silver Bay (Alaska) =

Deep water fjord southeast of Sitka, Alaska

Coordinates: 57°00′33″N 135°10′00″W

Silver Bay, or G̱ag̱eitʼ, in the Tlingit language, is a deep water fjord located southeast of Sitka, Alaska, United States, that indents Baranof Island. It was named through a United States Coast and Geodetic Survey translation of Bukhta Serebryanikova, a name published first by Captain Tebenkov of the Imperial Russian Navy in 1852.

== Economic significance ==
Silver Bay is on the eastern end of Eastern Channel and currently is the site of a prospective deep water dock for the City of Sitka at the Sawmill Cove Industrial Park. It is an access point for the Medvejie Fish Hatchery. It was the site, and provided access to, several mining claims in the early 1900s.

== Geology ==
It receives drainage from Medvejie Lake, Blue Lake, Salmon Lake, the Vodopad River through Green Lake, and Camp Lake. It follows a fault system that runs from Salisbury Sound, through Olga and Neva straits and over Mt. Verstovia.
