= Mount Bassie =

Mountain in Alaska, United States

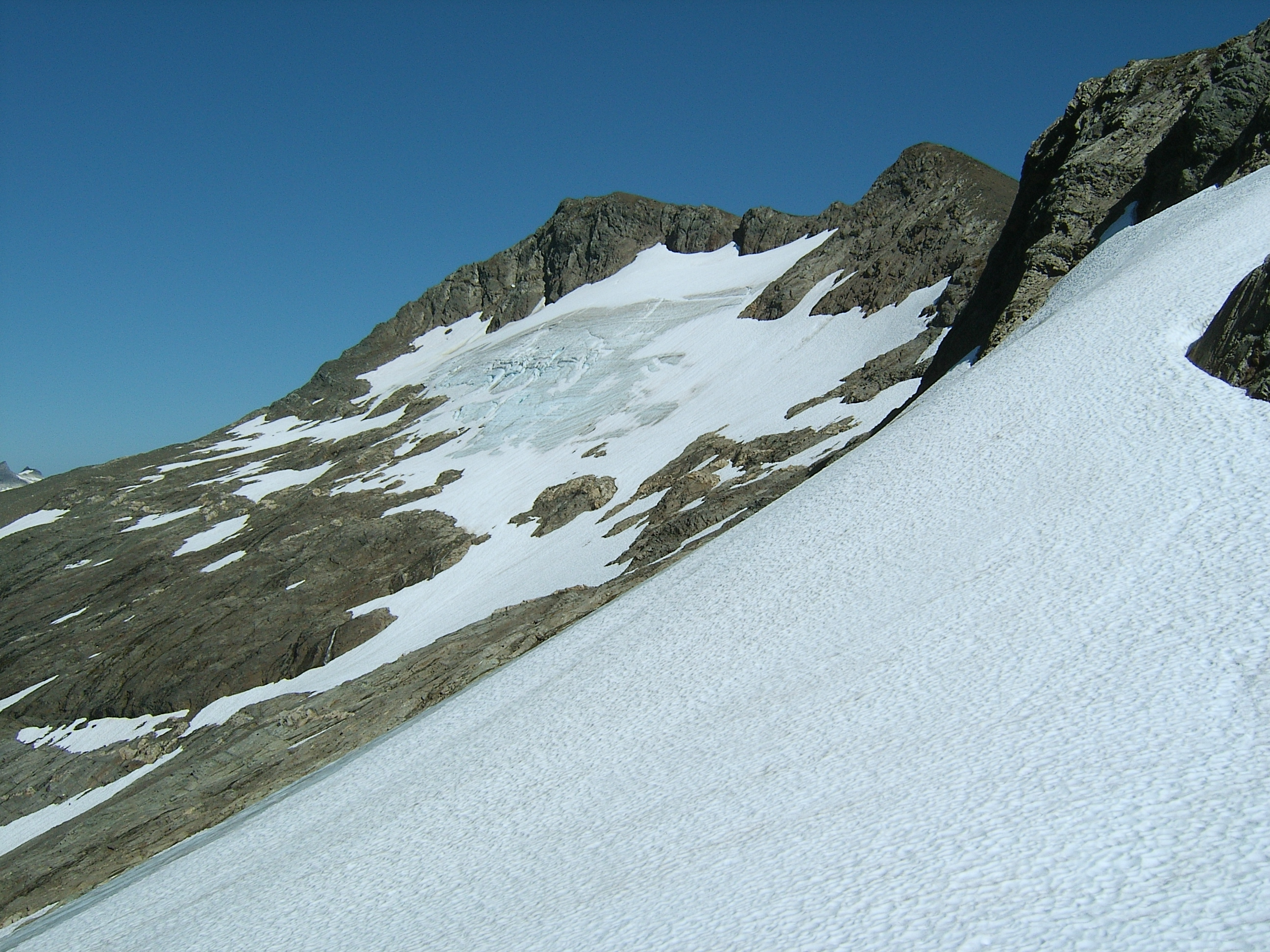
- The western face of Mount Bassie

Highest point
- Elevation: 4,301 ft (1,311 m)
- Prominence: 3,755 ft (1,145 m)
- Coordinates: 57°3′23″N 135°2′38″W

Geography
- Location within Alaska
- Location: Baranof Island, Sitka City and Borough, Alaska
- Topo map: USGS Sitka

Climbing
- First ascent: Unknown
- Easiest route: Scramble

Mount Bassie is a large mountain in the center of Baranof Island, Alaska, United States, within the City and Borough of Sitka.

Mount Bassie is a massive hulk of rock, its footprint covering nearly five square miles. It is bordered by the Blue Lake and Medvejie Lake watersheds and the Baranof River watershed, effectively splitting the island in two (one can see both Chatham Strait and the Pacific Ocean from the peak and its surrounding ridges). Mount Bassie is adjacent to Camp Lake, from which ascents typically originate. It is fairly isolated in terms of sister peaks and has only two modest lower ridges running off the south and north sides of the mountain. The rest of the mountain slopes down steeply into surrounding river valleys.
