= Karl Harald Felix Furuhjelm =

Russian noble (1830–1871)

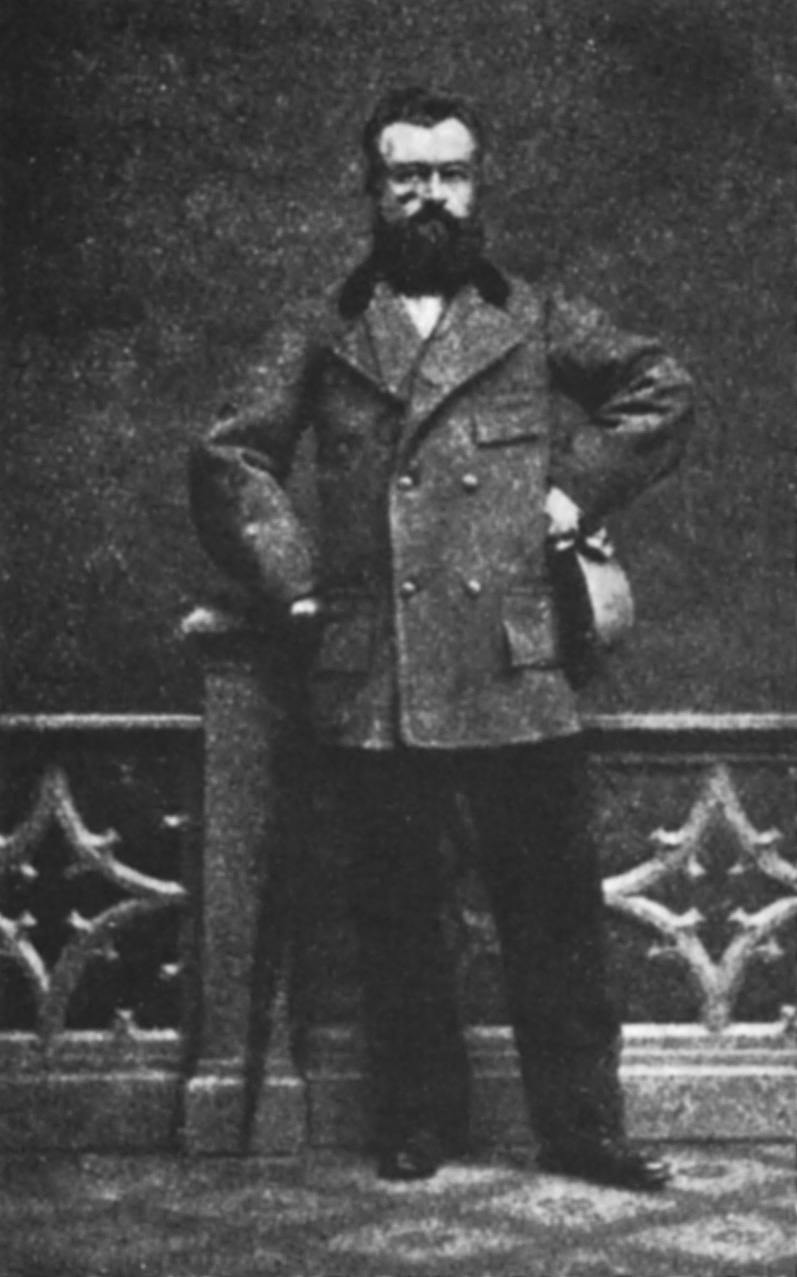
Furuhjelm

Karl Harald Felix Furuhjelm (Russian: Гаральд Васильевич Фуругельм, romanized: Garald Vasilyevich Furugelm; 13 May 1830 – 30 April 1871) was a Russian politician and noble of Finland-Swedish descent who served as the governor of the Siberian appanage department in Nakhodka.

== Life ==
Harald Furuhjelm was born into the Swedish-speaking Finnish noble family of Furuhjelm in Helsinki, then part of the Grand Duchy of Finland, on 13 May 1830. He was the son of Otto Wilhelm Furuhjelm (1794–1871) and Ulrica Johanna Fredrika Fock (1795–1856).

In 1854, Harald Furuhjelm graduated from the University of Helsinki. He was assigned to serve in Irkutsk to the headquarters of the Governor-general of Eastern Siberia, to the position of the translator of European languages. From 1855 to 1860, he participated in expeditions to eastern Siberia, including under the leadership of Governor-General Muravyov-Amursky. In 1860 he went to Petersburg, where he worked in the royal government for the Grand Duchy of Finland. On behalf of the new governor-general of Eastern Siberia, Mikhail Korsakov in 1866 led an expedition to survey the coast of Peter the Great Gulf between the rivers Suifun and Partizanskaya River in Ussuri krai for resettlement of peasants from the central regions of Russia, drew up plans for the future location of factory.

During the cruise, a mining on the river Suchan was discovered coal by engineer Taskin. In March 1867, a report on the work done Harald Furuhjelm arrived by sea to St. Petersburg, where he subsequently was transferred to Specific department and was appointed manager of the Empire lands department in the Maritime region with its center at the harbor of Nakhodka. From St. Petersburg with Furuhjelm to Nakhodka went surveyor Shishkin, accountant Kryukov, deputy manager and two physicians. Arriving at the last duty station, took office manager 13 November 1868. Supervised the construction of the factory.

He died of gangrene in his feet in Nakhodka on 30 April 1871 and was buried in the local cemetery in front of Cape Astafieva, later demolished under Stalin during the construction of the port in the 1940s.

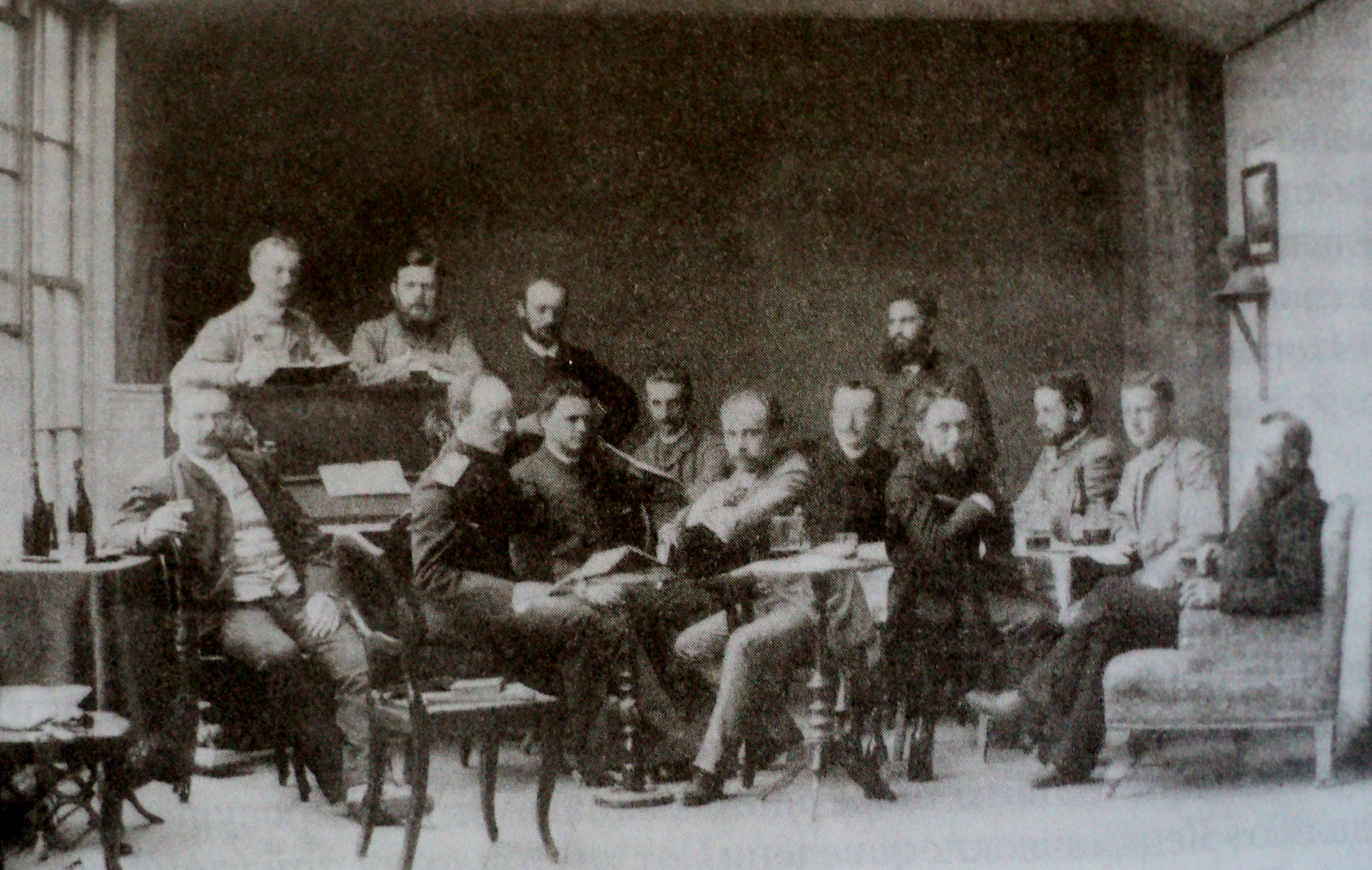
Harald sits in the center, Nakhodka

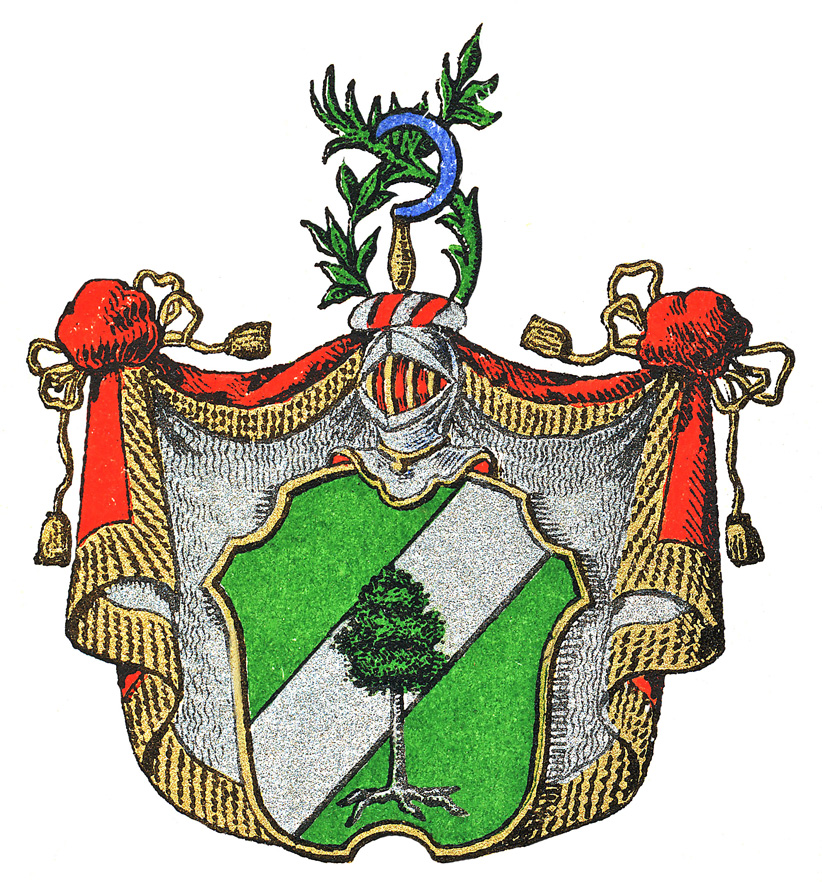
Ancestral coat of arms of Furuhjelm

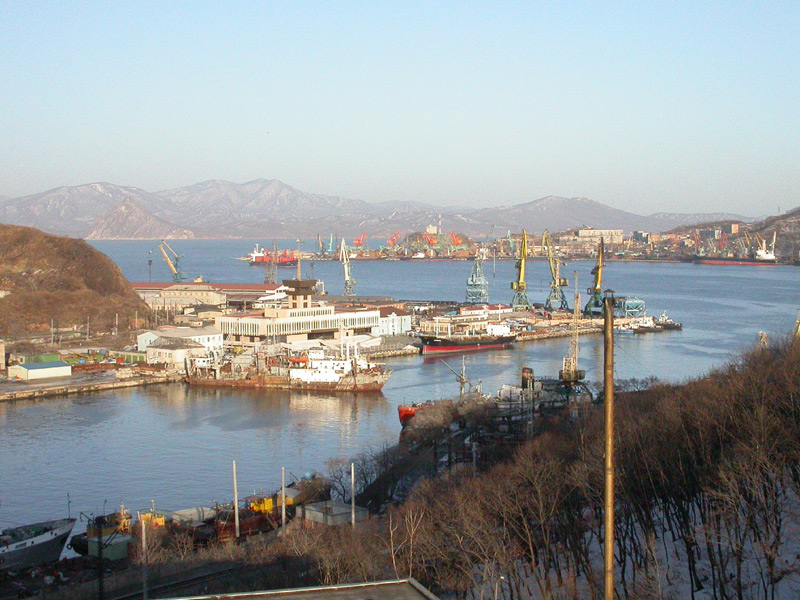
Nakhodka harbor — location of the Factory

== See also ==
- Johan Hampus Furuhjelm — military governor of the Primorye region, left the Far East in the autumn of 1871;
- Otto Wilhelm Furuhjelm — general of the Moscow Military District.
