= Alaska Whale Foundation =

American non-governmental organization

Alaska Whale Foundation (AWF) is a 501(c)(3) non-governmental organization founded in 1996 and based in Warm Springs Bay, Alaska, that studies humpback whales and their habitat in Southeast Alaska. AWF maintains a permanent research base on Baranof Island. AWF's mission is to ensure the long-term health of whales and coastal ecosystems, and pursues this mission through research, education, long-term monitoring programs, and community engagement efforts throughout Southeast Alaska.

Since its foundation, AWF has conducted several research projects in Southeast Alaska, including investigations into whale acoustics, individual and cooperative bubble-netting, cow-calf relationships and prey dynamics. AWF now operates its core long-term research and monitoring through the Ocean Health Program, which aims to safeguard our oceans for future generations by studying the impacts of changing oceans on marine ecosystems - focusing on humpback whales (Megaptera novaeangliae) as indicator, flagship, and umbrella species.

AWF is also part of the Alaska Region Marine Mammal Stranding Network and participates in marine mammal stranding response May through September.
