= Mount Ada =

Mountain in Alaska, United States

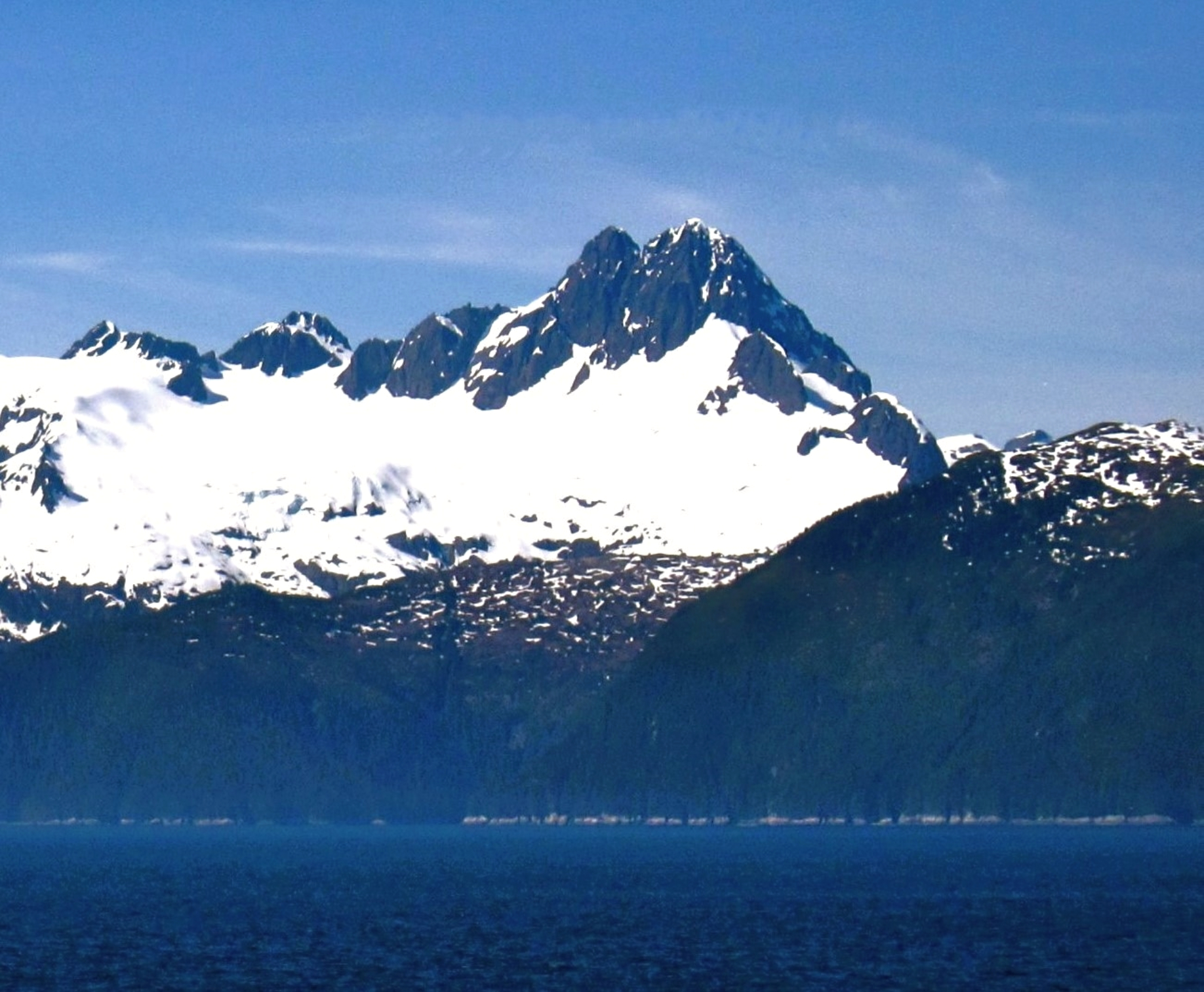
- North-northeast aspect

Highest point
- Elevation: 4,528 ft (1,380 m)
- Prominence: 4,328 ft (1,319 m)
- Parent peak: Peak 4650
- Isolation: 19.44 mi (31.29 km)
- Coordinates: 56°40′49″N 134°41′42″W

Naming
- Etymology: Ada Lester Jones

Geography
- Location within Alaska
- Country: United States
- State: Alaska
- City and Borough: Sitka
- Protected area: South Baranof Wilderness
- Parent range: Alexander Archipelago
- Topo map: USGS Port Alexander C-3

Mount Ada is a 4,528-foot-elevation (1,380-meter) mountain summit in Alaska, United States.

== Description ==
Mount Ada is located on Baranof Island and 30 miles (48 km) north of Port Alexander, Alaska. It is set within the South Baranof Wilderness on land managed by Tongass National Forest. The peak ranks as the highest summit in the wilderness and sixth-highest in Sitka Borough. Precipitation runoff from the mountain's slopes drains north to Gut Bay, south to Patterson Bay, or east to Yermak Lake and Chatham Strait. Although modest in elevation, topographic relief is significant as the summit rises 4,528 feet (1,380 m) above tidewater of Chatham Strait in 2.5 miles (4.0 km) and 4,170 feet (1,271 m) above Yermak Lake in 1.25 mi (2.01 km). The peak's name was applied in 1917 by the United States Coast and Geodetic Survey and the toponym was officially adopted in 1918 by the United States Board on Geographic Names. The mountain's namesake is Ada Lester Jones (1847–1920) who was the mother of Ernest Lester Jones, the superintendent of U.S. Coast and Geodetic Survey.

== Climate ==
Based on the Köppen climate classification, Mount Ada is located in a subpolar oceanic climate zone with long, cold, snowy winters, and cool summers. Weather systems coming off the Gulf of Alaska are forced upwards by the mountains (orographic lift), causing heavy precipitation in the form of rain and snow. Winter temperatures can drop to 10 °F with wind chill factors below 0 °F. This climate supports an unnamed glacier on the mountain's east slope.

== See also ==
- List of mountain peaks of Alaska
- Geography of Alaska
