= Warm Springs Bay =

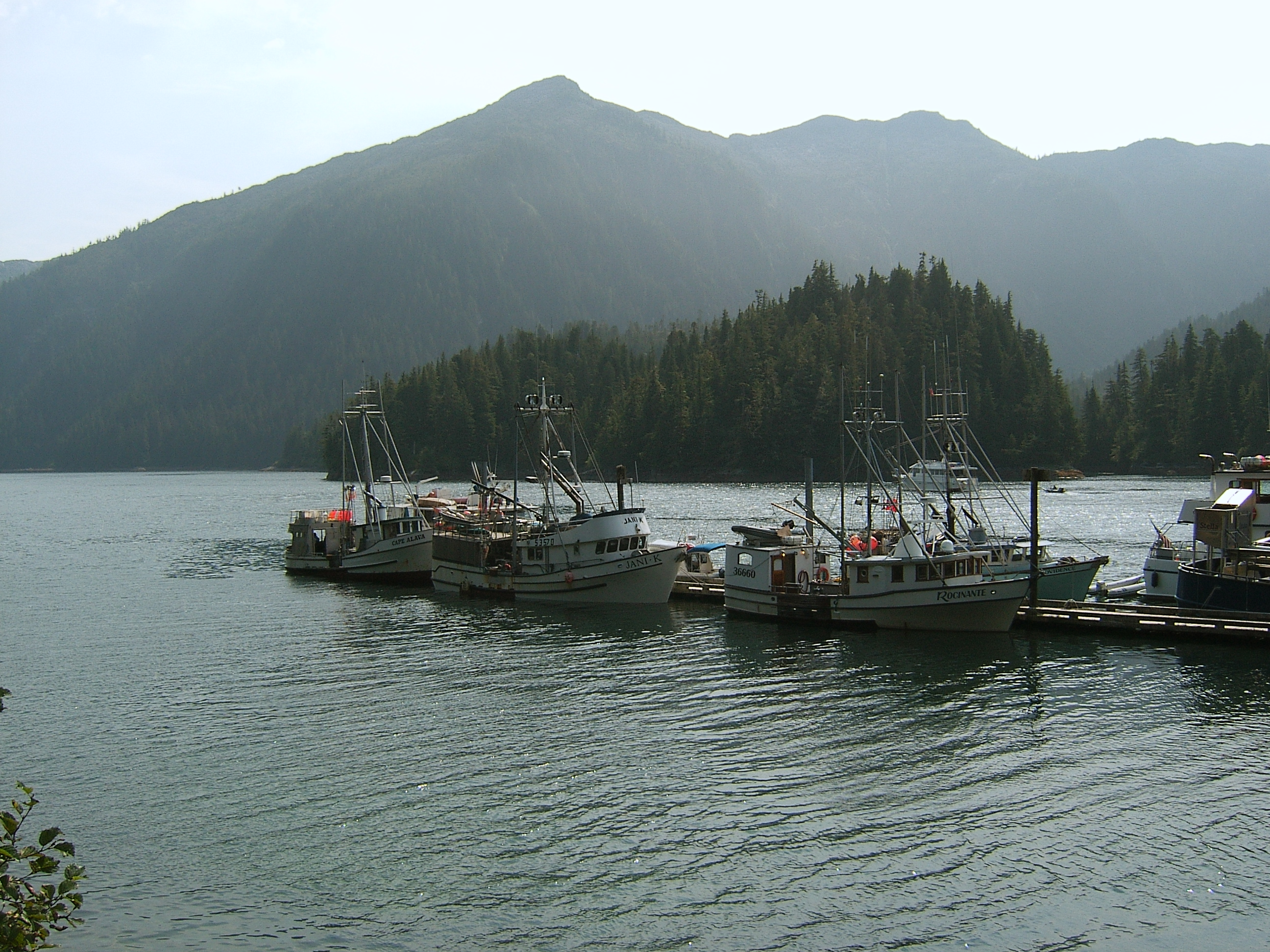
A view of the city dock during the summer fishing season at Warm Springs Bay.

Warm Springs Bay is a 2.4 mile-long bay located just outside the small community of Baranof Warm Springs on Baranof Island in the Alexander Archipelago, Alaska. Warm Springs Bay receives the outflow of Baranof Lake and Baranof River. Warm Springs Bay is located at 57°04′49″N 134°48′12″W.

It receives its name from the eponymous hot springs. Partly because of this, many fishing boats often take shelter or rest in the bay during the fishing season from Chatham Strait. The City of Sitka maintains a public-use dock on the north side of the bay for all boats, although there are no permanent slips.
