= Baranof Warm Springs (thermal mineral springs) =

Thermal spring

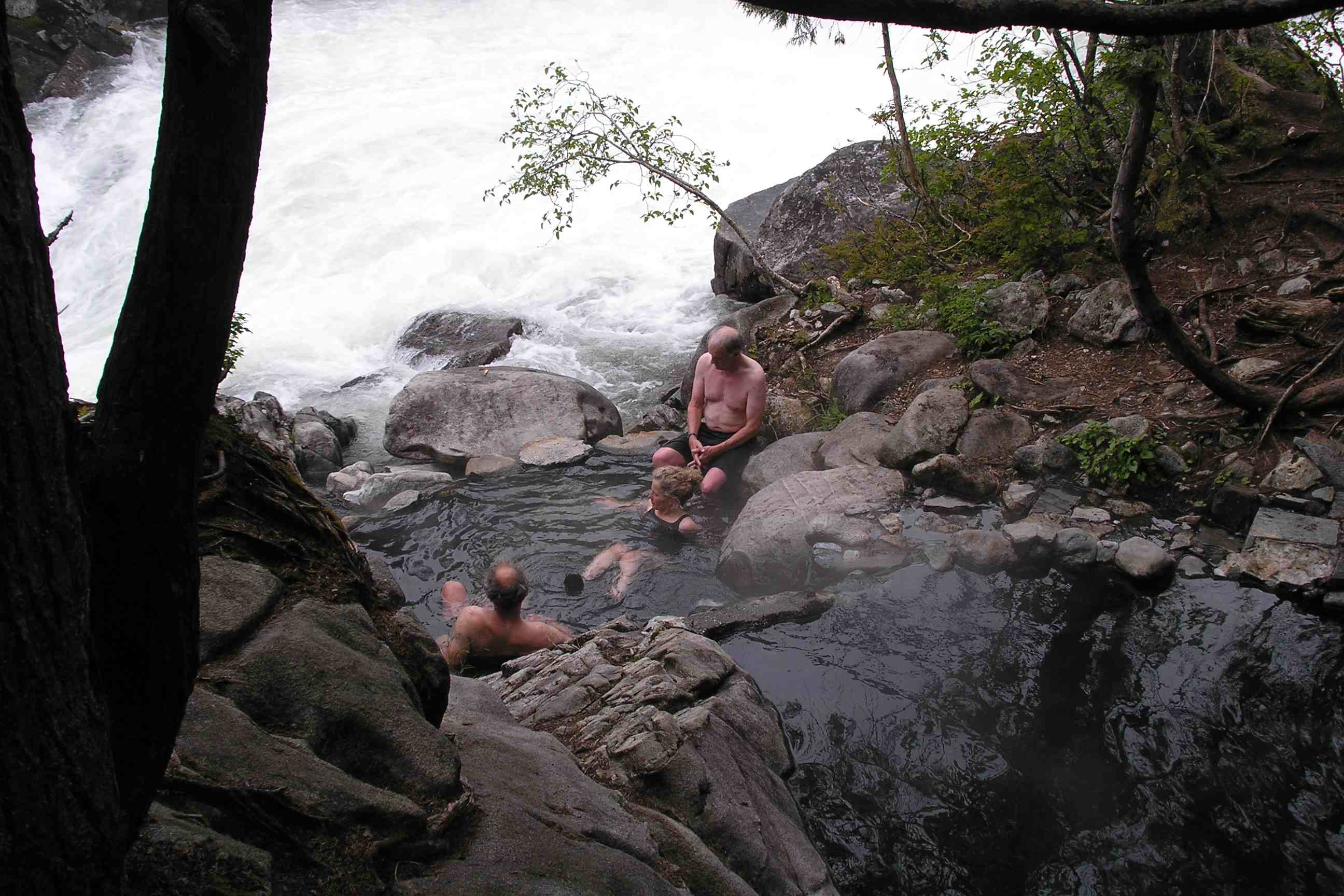
- Interactive map of Baranof Warm Springs
- Location: Sitka, Alaska
- Coordinates: 57°5′6″N 134°50′20.4″W
- Type: Geothermal
- Temperature: 124 °F (51 °C)

Baranof Warm Springs are a series of ten geothermal mineral springs located in the small community of Baranof Warm Springs 20 miles east of Sitka, Alaska on Baranof Island. The springs are surrounded by the Tongass National Forest. Access to the hot springs is by boat only, no road or air service is available to Baranof Island. There is a free public bathhouse on the island in addition to primitive undeveloped hot springs.

== History ==
The springs were originally used by the Tlingit of Angoon. Settlers later discovered the springs in 1891.

== Geography and geology ==
The springs are located on the north side of the Baronof River approximately 500 feet downstream from the Baranof Lake inlet. The springs flow from deposits of gravel, silt and quartz diorite boulder and bedrock.

== Water profile ==
The hot mineral water emerges from the ground at a temperature of 124 °F/51 °C. The water composition is sodium carbonate type, with large proportions of silica. The sulphurous hot mineral water flows from the source into several rock-lined soaking pools where it is cooled to between 108 °F and 110 °F. There are also three wooden roofed rooms supplied with the hot spring water.

== See also ==
- List of hot springs in the United States
- List of hot springs in the world
