= Baranow =

Baranow may refer to:

- Baranow, Edmonton, a neighbourhood in Edmonton, Canada
- Baranów, Greater Poland Voivodeship, a village in west-central Poland
- Baranów, Lublin Voivodeship, former town and shtetl
- Baranów, Grodzisk County in Masovian Voivodeship (east-central Poland)
- Baranów, Lipsko County in Masovian Voivodeship (east-central Poland)
- Baranów, Busko County in Świętokrzyskie Voivodeship (south-central Poland)
- Baranów, Kazimierza County in Świętokrzyskie Voivodeship (south-central Poland)

== See also ==
- Baranów Sandomierski, a town and castle in Subcarpathian Voivodeship (south-east Poland)
- Gmina Baranów (disambiguation), municipalities in Poland
- Baranov (disambiguation)
