= Annie Furuhjelm =

Finnish journalist, feminist activist, and writer (1859–1937)

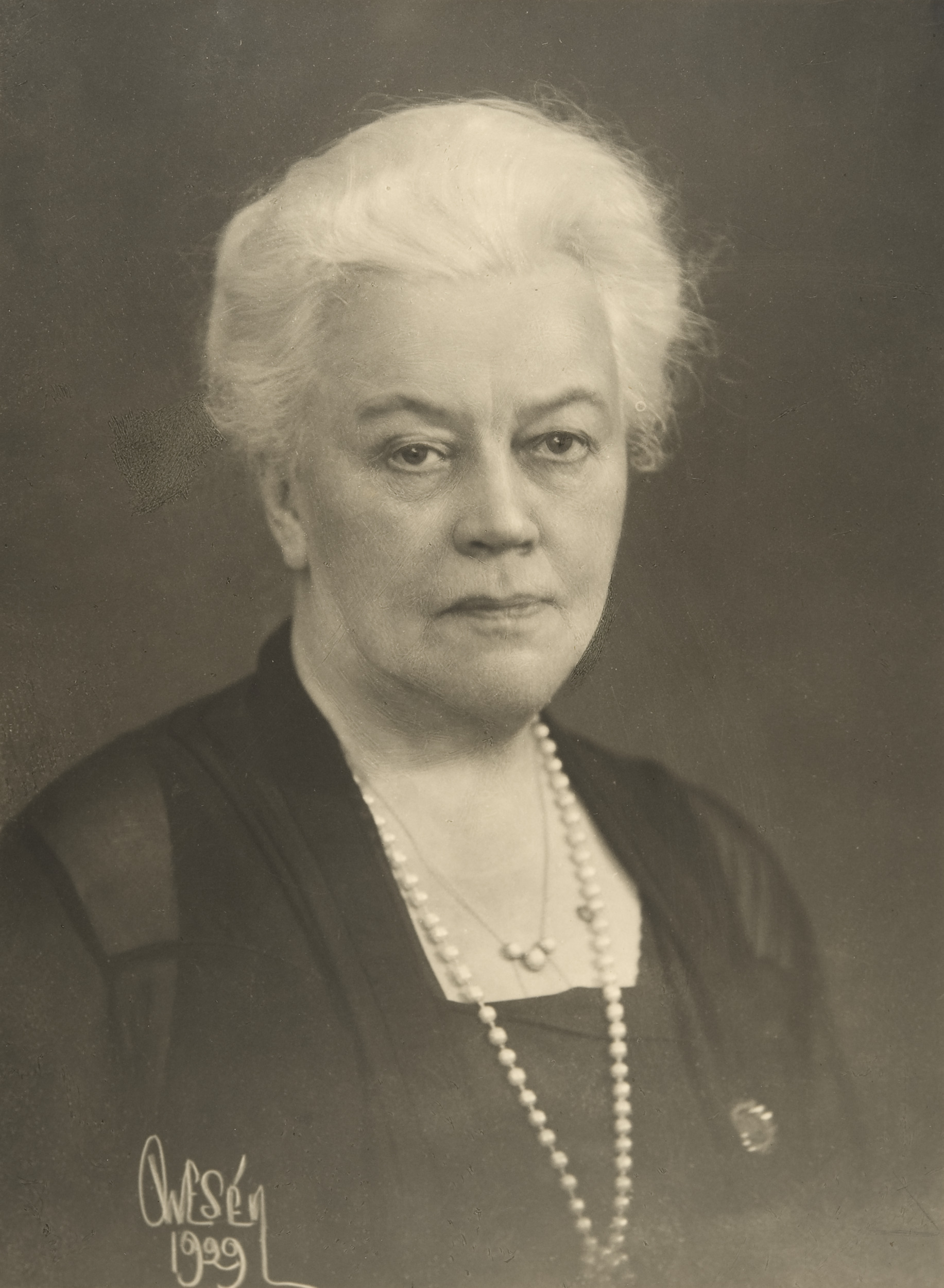
- Annie Furuhjelm, 1929
- Born: December 11, 1859; Sitka on Baranof Island, Russian Colony of Alaska
- Died: July 17, 1937 (aged 77); Hyvinkää, Finland
- Occupations: journalist, feminist activist, writer
- Father: Johan Hampus Furuhjelm
- Family: Furuhjelm

Annie Fredrika Furuhjelm (11 December 1859 – 17 July 1937) was a Finnish journalist, feminist activist, and writer. She was a member of the Parliament of Finland from 1913 to 1924 and again from 1927 to 1929, representing the Swedish People's Party of Finland (SFP). She was the first enfranchised woman in Europe to serve as a delegate to the International Women Suffrage Alliance and the first elected female legislator to speak before the British Parliament.

== Early life ==
Annie Fredrika Furuhjelm was born on 11 December 1859 at Rekoor Castle in Sitka on Baranof Island in the Russian Colony of Alaska. Her father, Johan Hampus Furuhjelm, was the penultimate Russian governor of Alaska and her mother, Anna Elisabeth von Schoultz, was the daughter of a Swedish-Finnish adventurer. When Alaska was purchased by the United States, the family left in 1867 for Russian Siberia, where they spent six years in Nikolayevsk-on-Amur before returning to Helsinki. In 1870, Furujhelm was sent to Dresden for schooling before rejoining her family in Helsinki in 1872. She was highly educated and fluently spoke English, French, German, Italian, Russian and Swedish, having completed studies at the girl's gymnasium in 1876 and post-graduate college in 1887.

== Career ==
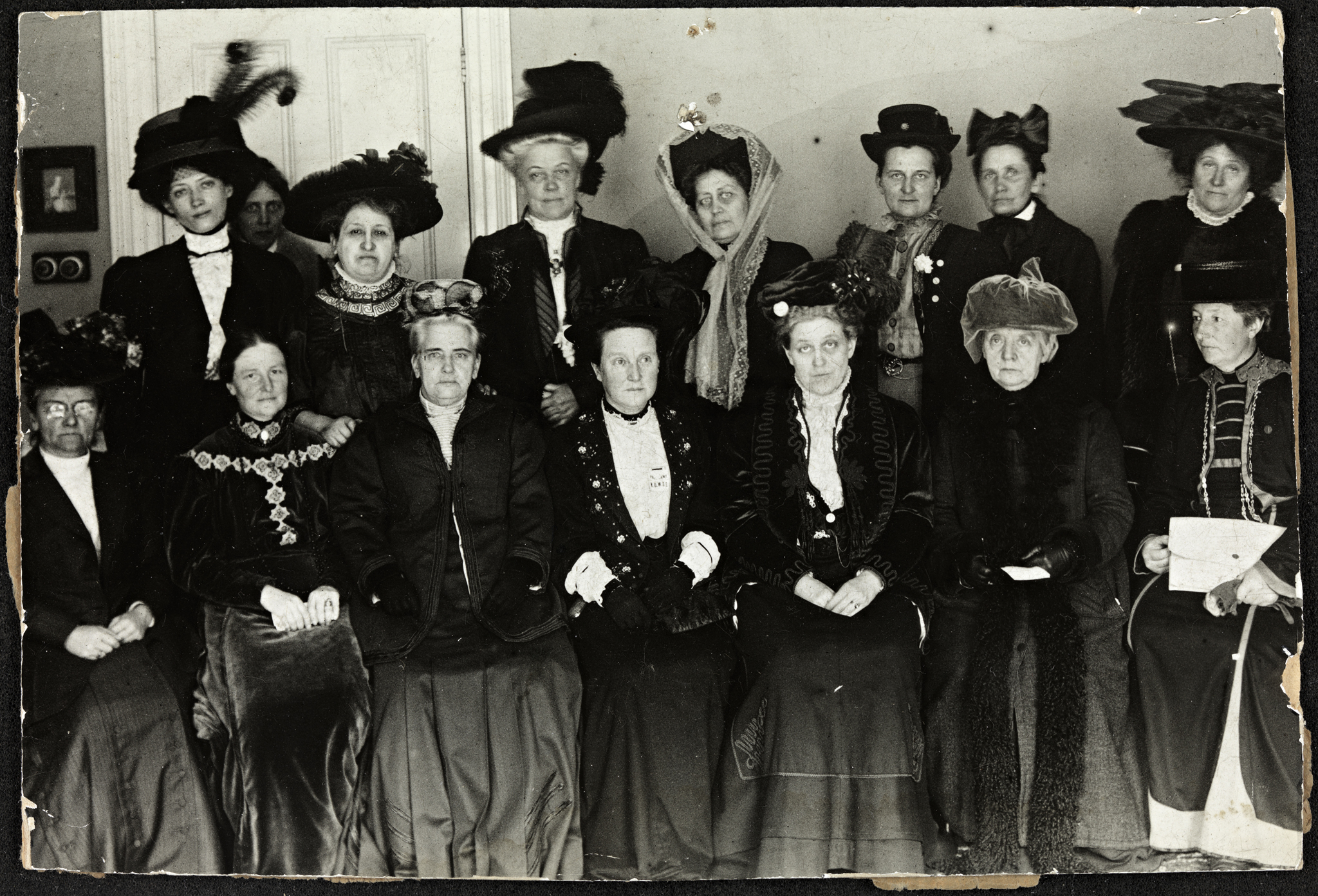
Suffrage Alliance Congress with Millicent Fawcett presiding, London 1909. Top row from left: Thora Daugaard (Denmark), Louise Qvam (Norway), Aletta Jacobs (Netherlands), Annie Furuhjelm (Finland), Madame Mirowitch (Russia), Käthe Schirmacher (Germany), Madame Honneger, unidentified. Bottom left: Unidentified, Anna Bugge (Sweden), Anna Howard Shaw (USA), Millicent Fawcett (Presiding, England), Carrie Chapman Catt (USA), F. M. Qvam (Norway), Anita Augspurg (Germany).

After completing her schooling, Furuhjelm lived on her family's estate and founded a school. She worked as a nurse for many years in the local community, but grew tired of the isolation and decided to become a journalist in 1890. She founded a newspaper called New Tide (Swedish: Nutid), which would become the mouthpiece of the Finnish women's organization, and served as its editor from 1901 to 1908. In 1899, Furuhjelm met with other likeminded women, including Lucina Hagman, Alli Nissinen, and Sofia Rein, to help Hagman organize the Martha organisation, a humanitarian organization to help women manage their homes. Since assembly was banned at that time by the Finnish government, the women met clandestinely in different members homes. Furuhjelm served as the first secretary of the organization. From 1908 to 1913, she also served as chairperson for the feminist organization Unioni.

In 1904, Furuhjelm attended the 5th congress of the International Council of Women (ICW) in Berlin and asked for help from the organization to found a Finnish suffrage organization. The ICW refused as Finland was still ruled by the Russian Empire, but Carrie Chapman Catt gave reassurances that the International Women Suffrage Alliance (IWSA) would support a Finnish suffrage organization. Furuhjelm returned from the conference energized and organized a conference which was attended by 1,000 women. The following year, she established the Committee for Women's Suffrage. Following the general strike, Finland re-gained its autonomy from Russia which de facto had been under dispute since 1899. Universal suffrage was granted to all Finnish citizens in 1906. When Finland's suffrage organization was approved for alliance with the IWSA in 1906, Furuhjelm became the first fully enfranchised European delegate of the association. Between 1909 and 1920, she was a board member of the IWSA and attended congresses of the organization from Finland's admittance in 1906 until 1929. She was the keynote speaker of the 1906 Copenhagen conference of the IWSA and was given a standing ovation for her speech.

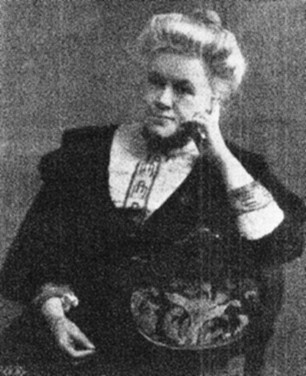
Annie Furuhjelm

The Swedish Women's Association of Finland was founded in 1907 with Furuhjelm elected to the presidency. She would maintain that position for her lifetime. She became a regular speaker at international suffrage meetings; a contributor to Jus Suffragii, the official journal of the IWSA; and a personal friend and companion to Catt. In 1913, Furuhjelm was elected to the Parliament of Finland, one of the first twenty-one females elected. In the following year, she accompanied Catt when she spoke to the British Parliament in London; this was the first time an elected woman legislator had addressed the Parliament. In 1917, she served as part of the Law Committee which briefly reestablished the Finnish Monarchy and issued the Finnish Declaration of Independence, which ultimately led to the Finnish Republic. In 1919, she began working as an editor of the journal Astra and would continue in that capacity until 1927. Furuhjelm served in the Diet until she was defeated in 1924 despite her campaign to end Finland's Prohibition Law. In 1925, she was a member of the electoral college for the presidential election. She was reelected to serve in 1927 as a representative of the Swedish People's Party of Finland (SFP). When Furuhjelm retired from politics in 1929, she was awarded the Order of the White Rose of Finland.

In her last years, Furuhjelm dedicated her time to women's rights organizations. She continued to push for the repeal of prohibition believing that the law was creating an upsurge in crime and smuggling and was not controlling the consumption of alcohol. She also published two volumes of memoirs, shortly before her death in Hyvinkää on 17 July 1937.

== Partial list of works ==
- Kvinnorna och lantdagsvalen (1910)
- Människor och öden (People and Fates) (1932)
- Den stigande oron (The Rising Unrest) (1935)
- Gryning: Efterlämnade minnen ur kvinnorörelsens historia (Dawn: Posthumous memories from the history of the women's movement) (1939)

== See also ==
- List of members of the Parliament of Finland, 1919–22
- List of members of the Parliament of Finland, 1922–24
