= Hidden Falls =

Hidden Falls may refer to:

== Places in the United States ==
- Hidden Falls (Baranof Island, Alaska)
- Hidden Falls (Hanging Rock, North Carolina)
- Hidden Falls (Placer County, California)
- Hidden Falls (Saint Paul, Minnesota)
- Hidden Falls (Teton County, Wyoming)

== Other Uses ==
- Camp Hidden Falls, a former Girl Scout camp in Dingman's Ferry, Pennsylvania
