= Baranof Warm Springs, Alaska =

Baranof Warm Springs Sitka
- Populated Place
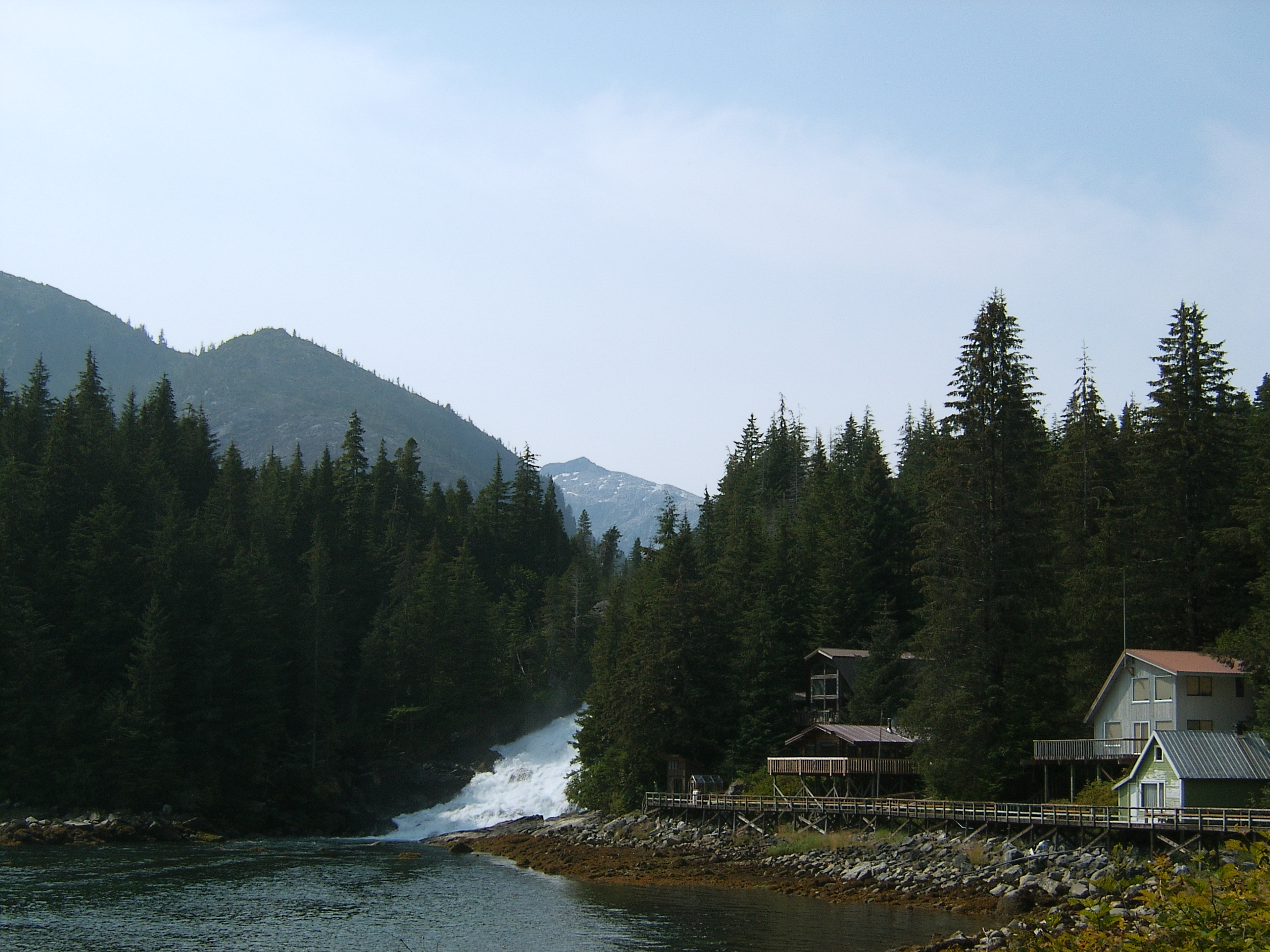
- Baranof Warm Springs and the rapids from Baranof Lake's outlet.

- Location in Alaska
- Coordinates: 57°05′22″N 134°49′59″W
- Country: United States
- State: Alaska
- Borough: Sitka City and Borough
- Elevation: 95 ft (29 m)
- Time zone: UTC-9 (Alaska (AKST))
  - Summer (DST): UTC-8 (AKDT)
- ZIP code: 99835
- Area code: 907
- FIPS code: 02-05090
- GNIS feature ID: 1420227

Baranof Warm Springs is a small, primarily seasonally-occupied community located in the city and borough of Sitka, Alaska, on the eastern side of Baranof Island, from which it likely derives its name, in the Alexander Archipelago. It is occasionally referred to simply as Baranof. Baranof Warm Springs is located at 57°05′22″N 134°49′59″W.

== Geography ==
Baranof Warm Springs is located on Warm Springs Bay which is just off of Chatham Strait. About a half mile up from the settlement is Baranof Lake, a large glacially-fed freshwater lake. Baranof Lake is fed from small unnamed glacial run-off streams as well as the relatively large Baranof River. Within the half mile outlet between Baranof Lake and Warm Springs Bay, there are a series of rapids and waterfalls that have proven to be lethal when run.

Baranof Warm Springs is located on the southern part of a 34-mile-long (55 km), 5-to-10-mile-wide (8.0 to 16.1 km) exposure of a biotite-quartz diorite batholith that crosses northern Baranof Island.

== Community ==
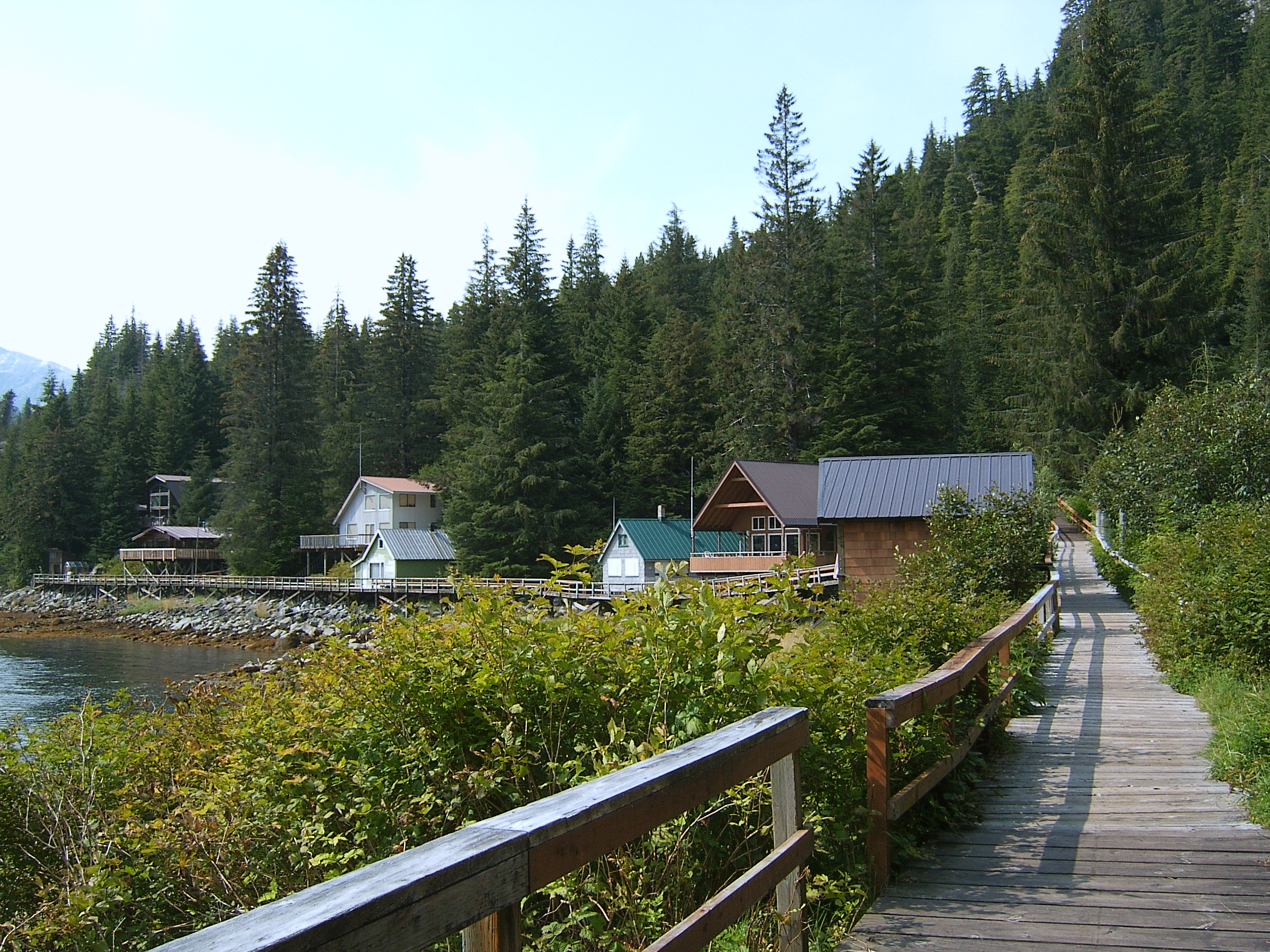
Baranof Warm Springs

Baranof Warm Springs is a very small community, having only caretakers in the winter and intermittent visitors in the summer. There are around 15 seasonal homes. The community lies inside the jurisdiction of the City and Borough of Sitka. Other than property taxes and any fees from the new dock (2016), there is only one tax-paying commercial enterprise, the Baranof Wilderness Lodge and Resort. The city, in return, funds maintenance of a boardwalk which serves as the main thoroughfare as well as the dock for transient vessels. The community of property owners (BPOA- Baranof Property Owners Association) pools money together to pay for a winter caretaker for seasonally-inhabited residences, the city-owned picnic shelter (possible shelter for those needing it), the public bath house (that features three separate tubs), and the communal warm springs pools. Another caretaker is hired to tend to the Baranof Lodge from October 1 to May 1 when the owners of the Lodge return.

== History ==
Baranof Warm Springs was used frequently by the Tlingit of Angoon. People of western descent did not find the springs until 1891. It was serviced by a post office from 1907 through 1912, under the name of Baranoff.

== Demographics ==
Historical population
Census	Pop.	Note	%±
1930	25		—
1940	10		−60.0%
U.S. Decennial Census

Baranof Warm Springs appeared on the U.S. Census twice as an unincorporated village. First in 1930 as Baranof with 25 residents and as "Baronof" in 1940 with 10 residents. The recently (2022) Enumeration Area sheets for the First Judicial District show that Baranof (as Baranof Warm Springs) had nine inhabitants at the time of the 1950 census. It was later annexed into the City and Borough of Sitka.

== Transportation ==
Baranof Warm Springs is accessible via floatplane with regularly scheduled flights leaving Sitka. The trans-island flight is 30 minutes on a clear day and an hour on an overcast one. The Alaska Marine Highway does not service Baranof Warm Springs, but Allen Marine takes supplies to the Baranof Wilderness Lodge and brings its guests back to Sitka every Saturday while the Lodge is operating and will allow ride-alongs upon request. Baranof Warm Springs itself does not feature any roads, and the boardwalk does not accommodate ATVs.

== Attractions ==
The primary attraction is the warm springs. There are a total of nine separate hot springs with temperatures from tepid to 120 degrees °F. Only one is developed in a natural state and is located up against the white water of the Baranof River. The community built a public bathhouse at the waterfront to provide an option for visitors not wanting to bathe communally and/or make the 1/4 mile hike up the trail to the natural springs.

Small tour boats come in frequently during the summer. Fishermen, and employees of the Hidden Falls Hatchery visit as well. On the northern end of Baranof Lake, there is also a Forest Service cabin that is quite popular. The cabin can only be reached by boat or float plane. The terrain is too steep to hike.

Baranof Warm Springs is home to the Coastal Research and Education Center, a research base and educational facility operated seasonally by the Alaska Whale Foundation.

== See also ==
- Baranof Warm Springs (thermal mineral springs)
