= Camp Lake (Alaska) =

Lake in the state of Alaska, United States

Camper's Lake
- Location within Alaska Location within North America
- Location: Baranof Island, Sitka City and Borough, Alaska, US
- Coordinates: 57°2′N 135°5′W
- Type: Tarn
- Primary outflows: Camper's Lake Valley Stream
- Basin countries: United States
- Surface elevation: 1,600 ft (490 m)

Camp Lake (located at 57°2′N 135°5′W) is a small snow-melt and rain-fed lake that feeds into the Blue Lake watershed on Baranof Island in the Alexander Archipelago in the Alaskan Panhandle. Camp Lake sits between Bear Mountain and Mount Bassie and atop a small headwall on the Medvejie Lake valley, although the lake drains into the Blue Lake watershed. Departing from the Medvejie Hatchery, the trail to Camp Lake spans approximately 3.33 miles (5.4 km) but requires considerable effort due to the difficult terrain and, in certain sections, dense vegetation.

Camp Lake is not named on USGS maps. In his book on hunting, Les Yaw names the lake "Camper's Lake".

== Images ==
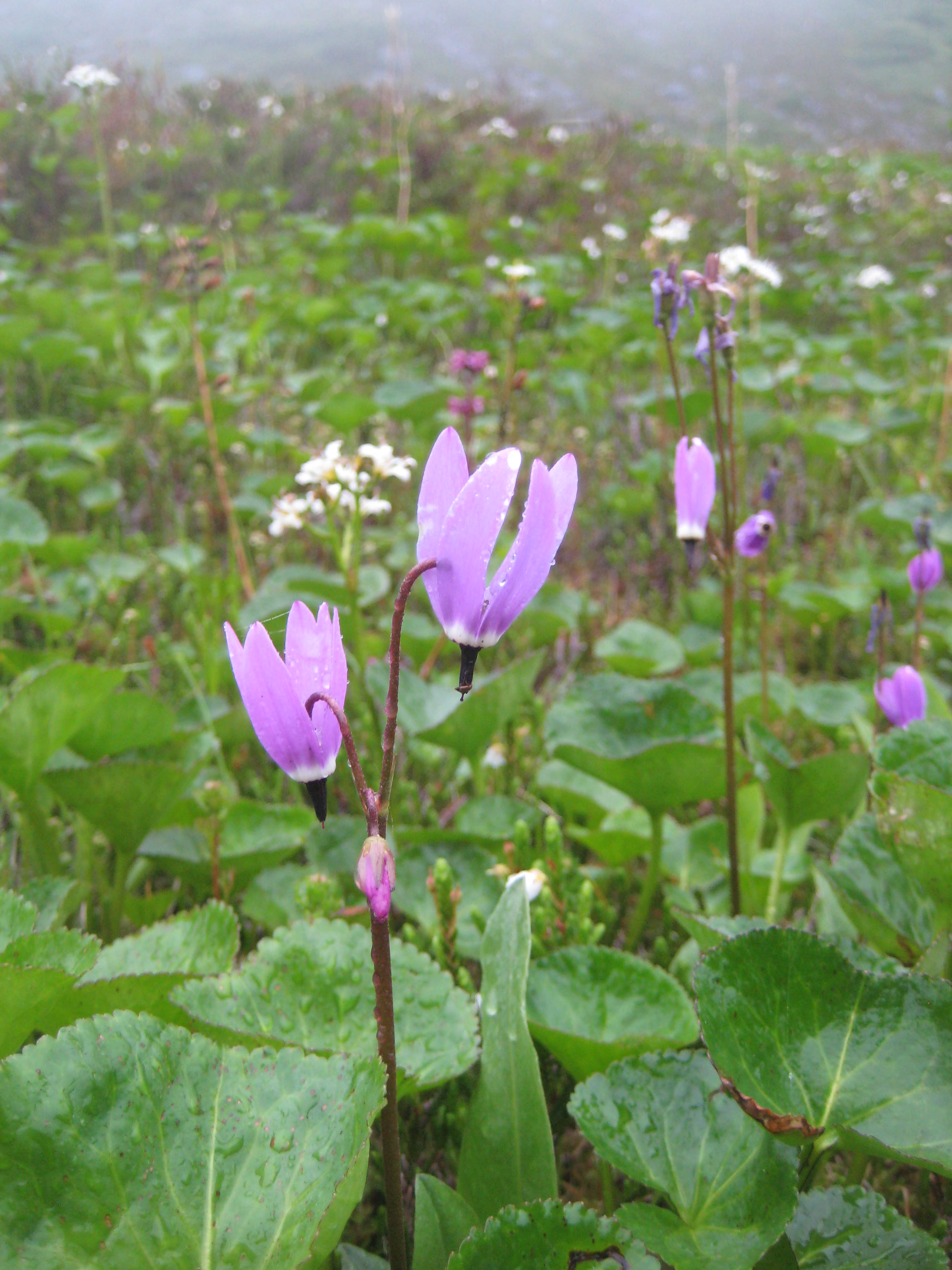
Camp Lake alpine meadow in early July, 2014

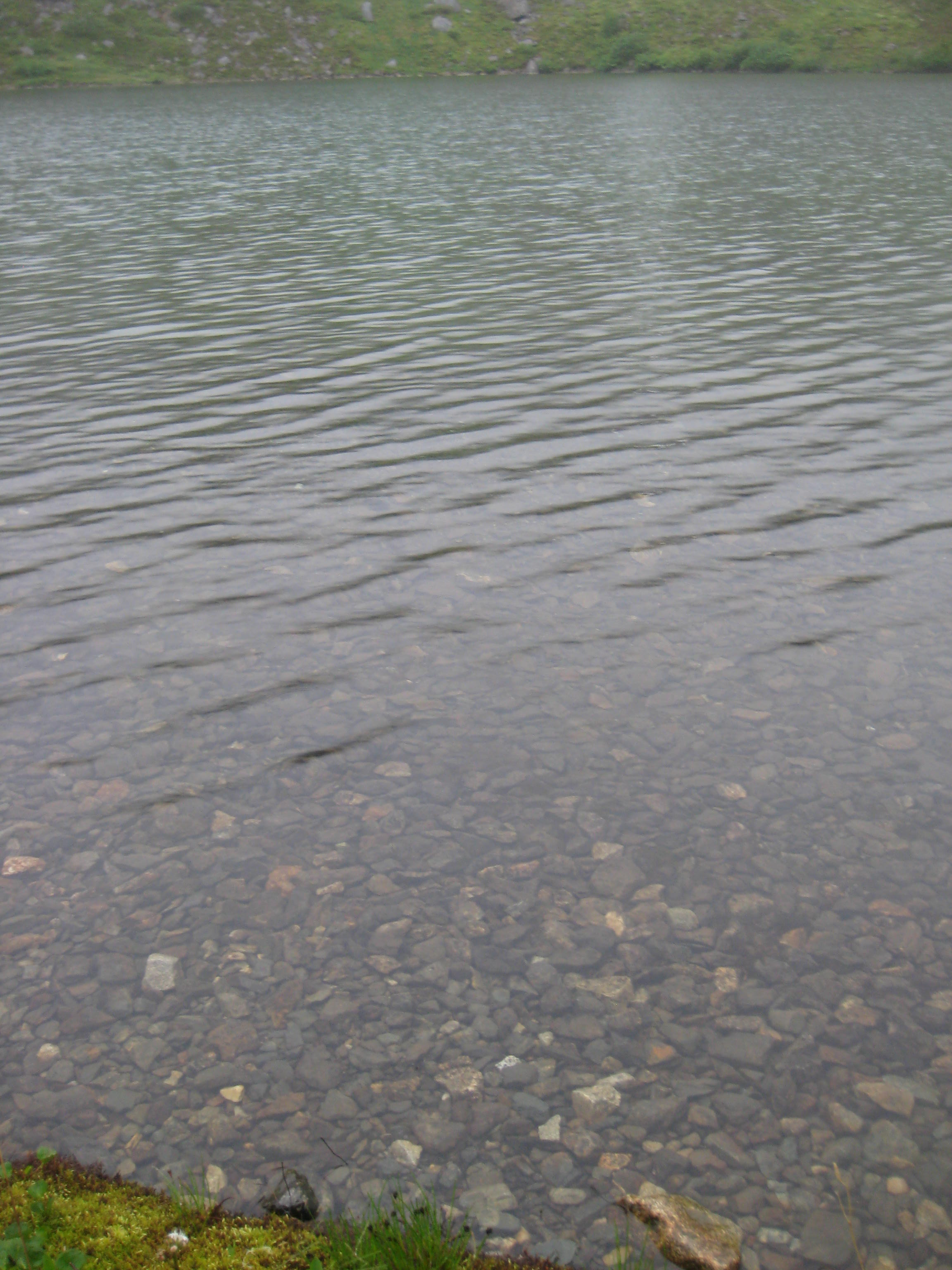
The West shore of Camp Lake
