= South Baranof Wilderness =

Wilderness area in Alaska, United States

Coordinates: 56°45′22″N 134°53′32″W

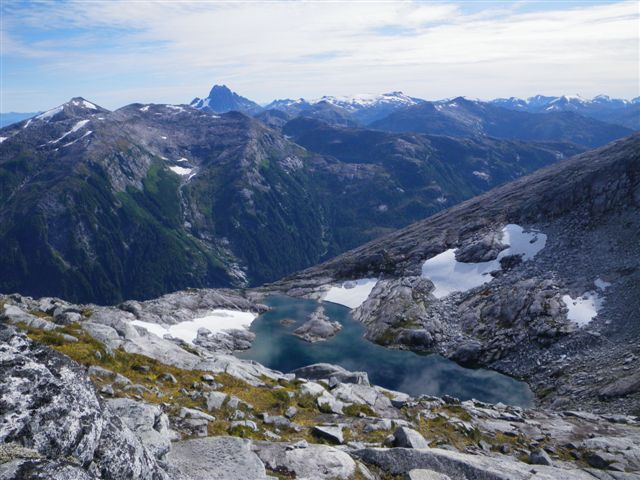
Alpine reaches of the South Baranof Wilderness.

The South Baranof Wilderness is a federally designated wilderness area within the Tongass National Forest, located on Baranof Island, Alaska. Covering 319,568 acres south of Sitka, the South Baranof protects glacier-carved fjords, hanging valleys, old-growth temperate rainforests and sheer granite mountains.

The wilderness was created by Congress in 1980 as part of the Alaska National Interest Lands Conservation Act.

The highest point in the wilderness is Mount Ada, elevation 4,528-feet (1,380-meters).
