= Mount Furuhelm =

Mountain in Alaska, United States

- Location within Alaska

Highest point
- Elevation: 3,620 ft (1,100 m)
- Prominence: Unknown
- Coordinates: 57°3′0″N 134°55′47″W

Geography
- Location: Baranof Island, Sitka City and Borough, Alaska
- Topo map: USGS Sitka

Climbing
- First ascent: Unknown
- Easiest route: Scramble

Mount Furuhelm is a 3,620 foot (1,104 meters) peak located on Baranof Island just east and adjacent to Peak 5390 in Alaska. It is located at 57°03′00″N 134°55′47″W.

Mount Furuhelm was named for Johan Hampus Furuhjelm (known in Russian as Ivan Vasiliyevich Furugelm), who was governor of Russian America from 1859 to 1863.

Mount Furuhelm actually has both an east and west peak less than a quarter mile apart, with the west peak being a mere ten feet higher at (3,620 feet) than the eastern one (3,610 feet).
