= Furugelm Island =

Furuhjelm
Native name: Russian: Фуругельм
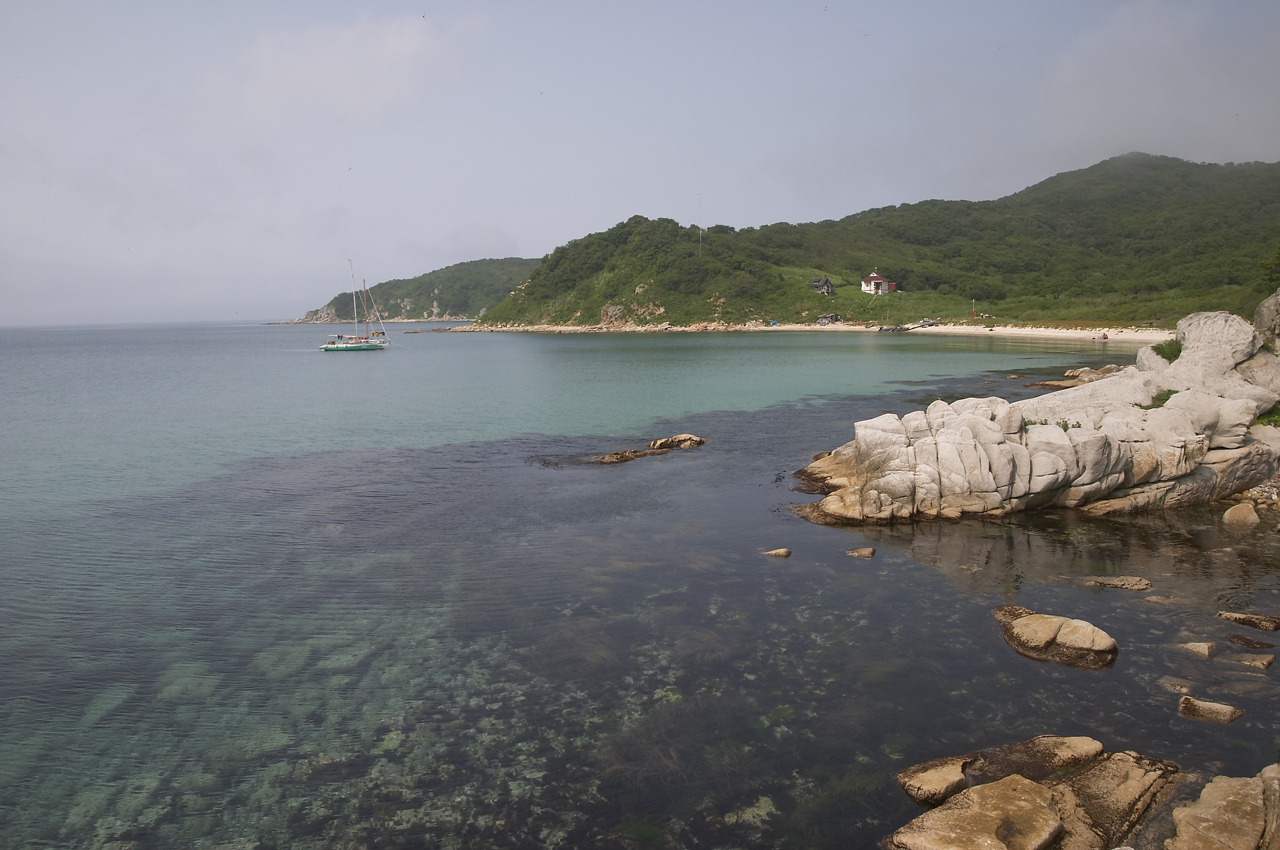
- Furuhjelm Island
- Interactive map of Furuhjelm

Geography
- Location: Sea of Japan
- Coordinates: 42°27′55″N 130°55′10″E
- Total islands: 1
- Area: 1.9 km^{2} (0.73 sq mi)
- Highest elevation: 120 m (390 ft)

Administration
- Russia
- Krai: Primorsky

Demographics
- Population: None

Furuhjelm Island (Russian: Остров Фуругельма) is an island in the southwest part of Peter the Great Gulf in the Sea of Japan, 110 km southwest of Vladivostok. It belongs to Khasansky District of Primorsky Krai, Russia.

== History ==
The island was described by the sailors of the frigate Pallada on May 10, 1854, and named for Johan Hampus Furuhjelm, captain of the transport Knyaz Menshikov, which belonged to the Russian-American Company.

After 1922, with the advent of the system of fishing kolkhozes and state fishery enterprises, several fishing facilities were located on the island. Greater renown came to the island after the opening of wild animal farms, on which for the first time selective breeders began to raise blue minks. For a while, all was well. Later, the minks killed almost all the local birds. The bird colonies took a long time to recover.

Following the deterioration of relations with Japan began the construction of coastal defenses on Furuhjelm Island. Artillery batteries and several anti-landing reinforcements were introduced. They remained in the battle-ready state during the Korean War.

At the end of the 1970s the military garrison was dissolved.

There is currently no permanent population on the island. Since March 24, 1978, the territory of the island has belonged to the Far-East State Marine Reserve.

== Geography ==
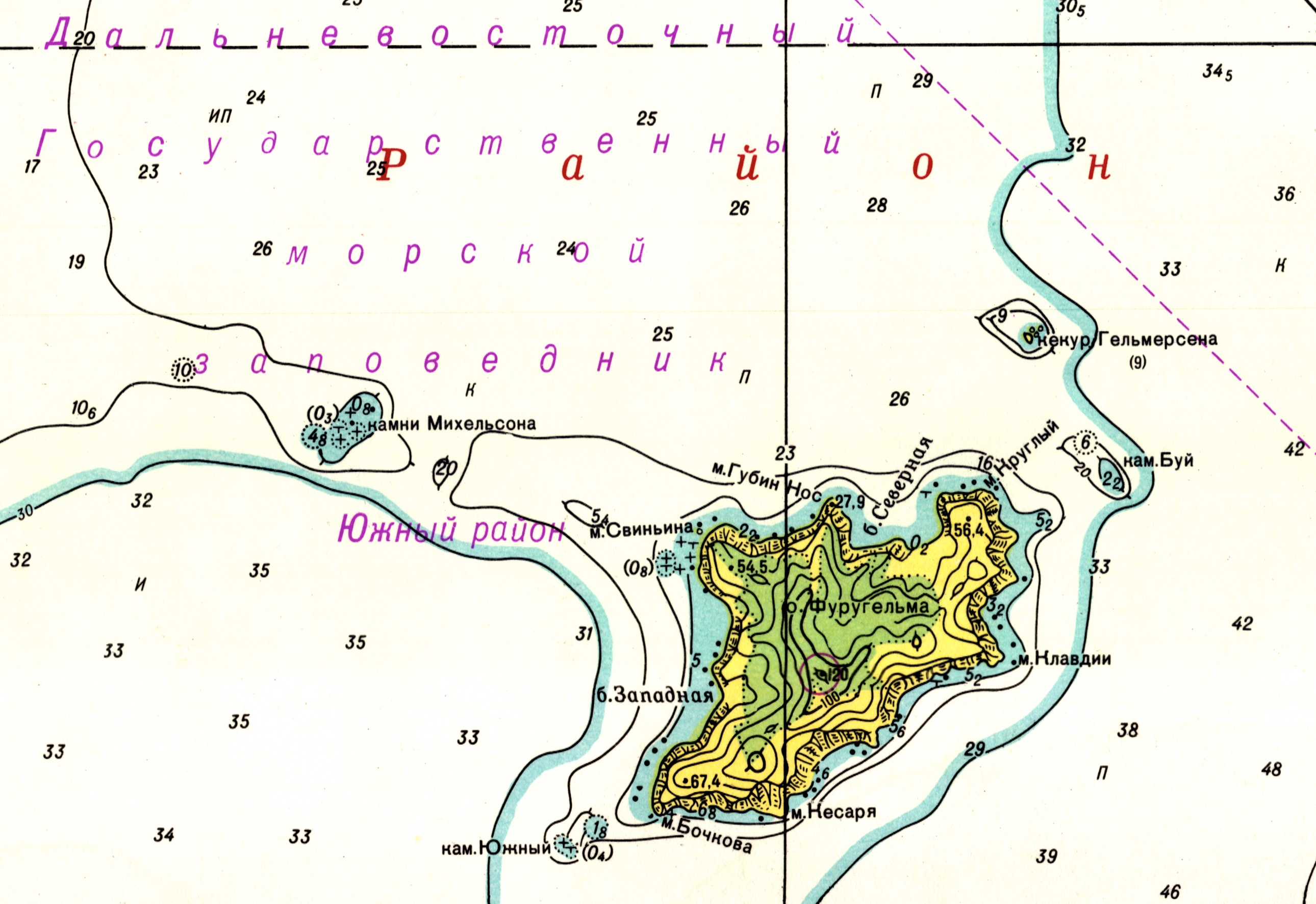
Sailing map of Furugelm Island

Furugelm Island is the most southerly island of the Maritime Province and all Russia, located almost at the border with North Korea. This parcel of Russian land is also called "the last Russian island". It is not large, about 2.5 kilometres (1.6 mi) long and 1.5 kilometres (0.93 mi) wide; and relatively low, with a maximum height of 120 metres (390 ft). The shore of the island consists of rocky cliffs. The island is surrounded by shallows of depth less than 10 m, on which lie exposed and submerged rocks. On the western side, it is fronted by small bays with stone columns standing haphazardly in the water.

== Nature ==
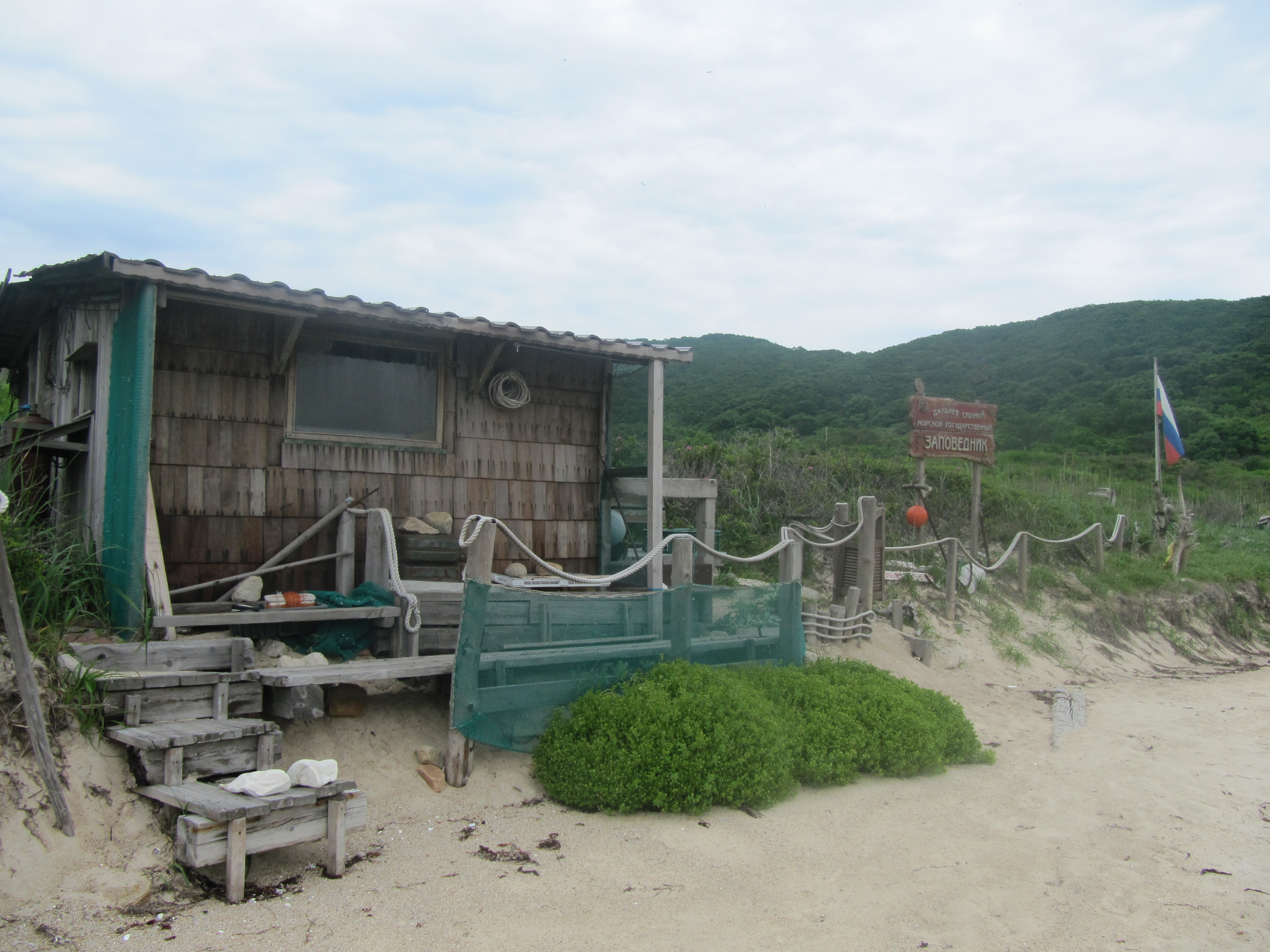
Furugelma Island

The island is known for its seabird colonies. The black-tailed gull colony numbers more than 50,000 birds. It is neighbored by a settlement of spectacled guillemots and Brunnich's guillemot. The island also serves as a resting place for migrating birds recorded in the IUCN Red List, such as petrels, sea eagles, skuas, and Ross's gulls.

In all, the island has more than 300 species of birds registered, 80 of them nesting. In Russia, such a variety is not found even in the Volga delta. Red-book varieties are found: red-crowned and white-naped cranes, black griffon, white-tailed eagle, golden eagle, and peregrine falcon. The largest currently extant colony of Japanese cormorant and black-tailed gull colonies in the world are located on this island. In all, seabird colonies in May and June consist of up to 100,000 birds.

Among mammals on the island are the field mouse and reed vole.

From the land, reptiles are found a small quantity of Japanese natrix and steppes ratsnake.

On the Mikhelson Rocks, not far from the island, live seals. Not knowing what a hunter is, they are completely unafraid of humans and allow themselves to be photographed.

On the sandy bottom of the island's bays, there are colonies of scallops, the largest in the Maritime Province.

== Epidemiological circumstances ==
On the island, there have been noted cases of people contracting Japanese encephalitis.

== Climate ==
The coldest month is January when the average air temperature is −11 °C (12 °F). The warmest month is August when the average air temperature is 21 °C (70 °F).

The water in August can warm, up to 23–25 °C (73–77 °F).
