= Furuhjelm family =

Swedish/Finnish noble family

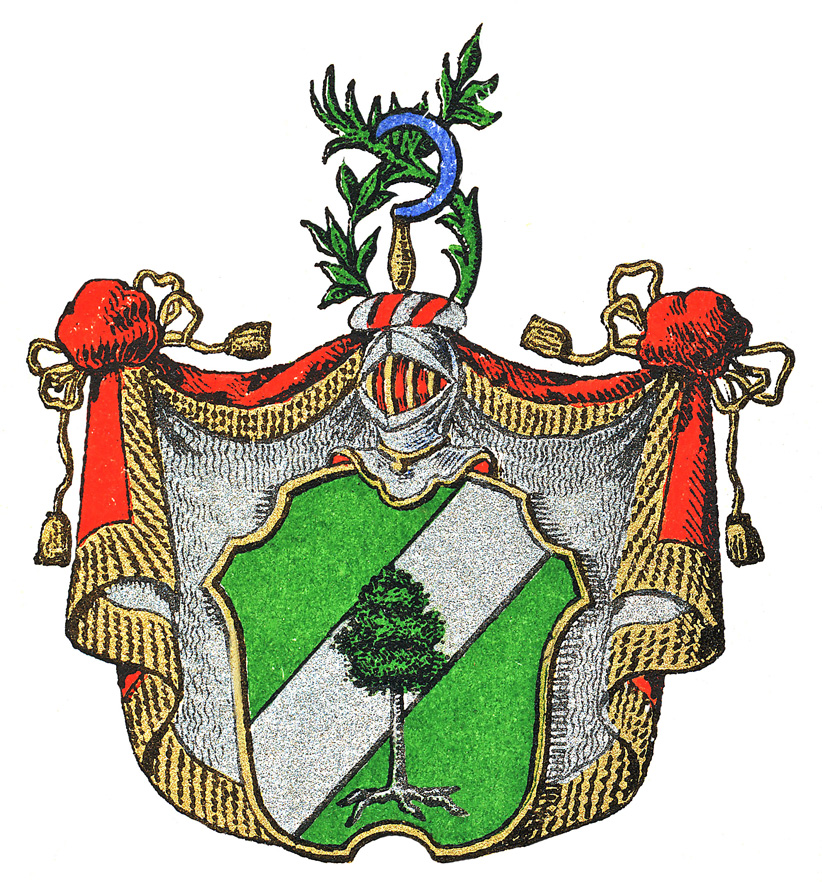
Ancestral coat of arms of Furuhjelm family

The Furuhjelm family is a Swedish and Finnish noble family from Stockholm. The earliest reference dates back to 16th century, with merchant Olof Naucler being the oldest of known ancestors. The family is thought to be of German origin. The surname Furuhjelm originated in 1776. The coat of arms was registered at Finland's Riddarhus (House of Nobility) in 1818.

== Notable members ==
- Johan Hampus Furuhjelm (1821–1909), Russian vice-admiral, explorer, President of Russian-American Company, Governor of Taganrog in 1874–1876, Governor of Russian America, 1859–1863
- Sten Knut Johan Furuhjelm (1813–1892), Hero of the Crimean War during the siege of Bomarsund fortress, awarded with an Order of the White Eagle in 1879
- Otto Wilhelm Furuhjelm (1819–1883), Russian lieutenant-general of Finnish descent
- Edvard Furuhjelm, governor of Oulu (province) in 1901–1903
- Annie Furuhjelm (1859–1937), one of the foremost figures within the international women's movement and a member of Finland's Parliament.
- Ragnar Furuhjelm (1879–1944), a Finnish astronomer and politician

== See also ==
- List of Swedish noble families
- List of Finnish noble families
