= Johan Hampus Furuhjelm =

Finno-Russian nobleman, admiral, and governor (1821–1909)

Vice-admiral Johan Hampus Furuhjelm
- Johan Hampus Furuhjelm
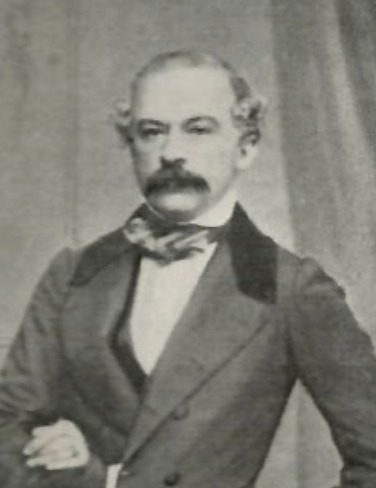
- Born: 11 March 1821; Helsinki, Grand Duchy of Finland, Russian Empire
- Died: 21 September 1909 (aged 88); Urjala, Grand Duchy of Finland, Russian Empire
- Spouse: Anna Furuhjelm
- Children: 3, including Annie
- Relatives: Otto Wilhelm Furuhjelm (brother)
- Military career
- Allegiance: Russia
- Branch: Imperial Russian Navy
- Service years: 1836–1908
- Rank: Vice-admiral

Ancestral coat of arms of Furuhjelm

Johan Hampus Furuhjelm, (Russian: Фуругельм, Иван Васильевич; 11 March 1821 – 21 September 1909) was a Russian Finnish vice-admiral and explorer, commander of the Russian Baltic Fleet, and governor of the Russian Far East, Taganrog and Russian America.

== Early years ==
Johan Hampus Furuhjelm was born into a Swedish-speaking noble family of Furuhjelm in Helsinki, Grand Duchy of Finland on March 11, 1821. Johan Hampus was the son of Otto Wilhelm Furuhjelm (1794–1871) and Ulrica Johanna Fredrika Fock (1795–1856). Johan Hampus was schooled at home until 1836 when he joined the Navy (1st Finnish Sea Battalion 1:a finska sjöekipaget). Graduate of the Navy Corps, Furuhjelm served at Russian Baltic Fleet in 1838–1846. Promoted to midshipman 1839, lieutenant 1845. In 1843–1844, he participated in hydrographic works in the Gulf of Finland on board the schooner Meteor. In 1846–1847, he served at the Black Sea.

== In Russian America ==
In 1850, Furuhjelm was detached to the new post in the Russian-American Company and sailed from Kronstadt to Novoarkhangel'sk (New Archangel, as the Russian community in Sitka was called) on board of the ship Nikolai I. He arrived to Novoarkhangel'sk on 23 April 1851, where he was appointed commander of Novoarkhangel'sk's seaport and sailed to Hawaii, California and China on behalf of the Russian-American Company. In 1853–1854, Furuhjelm was captain of the supply ship Count Menshikoff in the squadron of Admiral Yevfimy Putyatin. In 1854, he was appointed commander of the Ayan seaport and on 11 December 1858, Governor of Russian America. During a Christmas ball in Helsinki in 1858, Furuhjelm met the 22-year-old Anna von Schoultz. On 10 January they were engaged and on 2 February 1859 the wedding took place. In Novo Archangelsk, Furuhjelm was forced to acknowledge that one of the most acute needs was rebuilding the Indians' trust in the white man. During his period as governor of Alaska, he managed to put an end to hostilities with natives. Once, he used the trick of an eclipse of the moon. He threatened the Indians to take away the moon if they did not obey him. Furuhjelm's magic made a deep impression on the natives. They were also impressed because the governor dared to go out on inspection tours without an escort. He made the trips with just paddlers and an interpreter. Furuhjelm was successful in winning the Indians' respect and the camp was normalized.

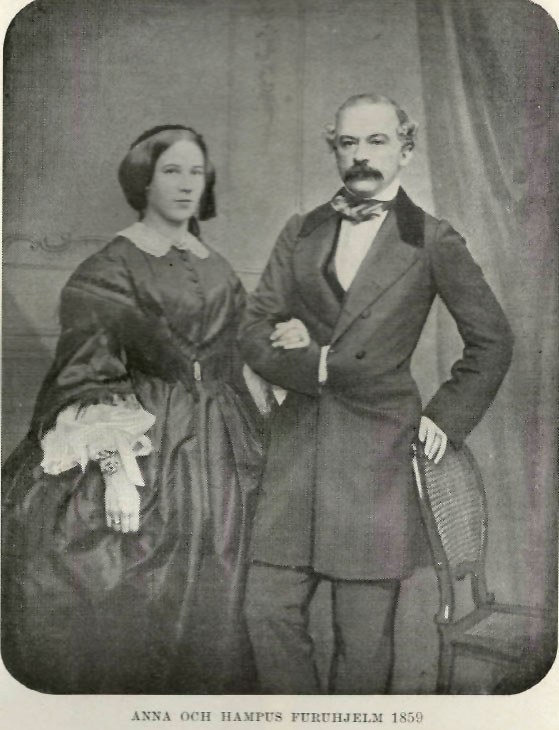
Johan Hampus and Anna Furuhjelm. 1859.

One of the most important successes which Furuhjelm noted during his period as governor was that he was successful in abolishing the ice treaty with San Francisco. According to a contract which had been signed, Russian America had to deliver a certain amount of ice to San Francisco at a fixed price. The problem was that the product melted down on the way to the warmer climates. The ice contract became very awkward for the Russian colony. Furuhjelm arranged for a new contract to sell ice to San Francisco: 3,000 tons at $25.00 a ton.

The Furuhjelms had three children during their five years in Russian America. The oldest daughter Annie Furuhjelm later became one of the foremost figures within the international women's movement and a member of Finland's Parliament. On 17 March 1864 Johan Hampus Furuhjelm turned over his duties to prince Dmitri Petrovich Maksutov, who happened to be the last governor of Russian America. In the summer of 1864 it was time for the Furuhjelm family to make a move and leave Russian America.

== Later years ==
In 1865–1870, Furuhjelm served as military governor of Primorsky Krai. On 25 February 1871 he was appointed chief of Russian seaports in the Pacific, where he contributed a lot to development of Vladivostok and Primorsky Krai, opened the Amur Telegraph Company, several lighthouses and ship dockyards. In 1872 Furuhjelm was made Flag Officer of the Russian Baltic Fleet. In 1874, Ivan Furugelm was promoted to the rank of vice admiral and appointed governor of the city of Taganrog (1874–1876), where he opened the first naval school (founded by Ivan Shestakov) and the first public library (Chekhov Library) on 23 May 1876 (old style). Among library's most frequent visitors was Anton Chekhov. Anna Furuhjelm joined her husband in Taganrog for the winter 1874–1875 with the two youngest children. In 1878–1880 Hampus Furuhjelm served as commander of Revel's naval port. From 1880 until 1886, he was at the disposal of the commander of the port of Saint Petersburg. In 1889, on the occasion of his jubilee as an officer in the Imperial Russian Navy, he received a golden snuffbox, decorated with diamonds and the initials of Alexander III of Russia.

Furuhjelm died on 21 September 1909 near Urjala, present-day Finland.

== Places named after Furuhjelm ==
- Mount Furuhelm – A mountain 3,610 ft., 4.5 miles SW of Baranof, on East coast of Baranof Island, Alexander Archipelago. Named in 1935 by U.S. Forest Service for Ivan Vasilievitch Furuhelm, mining engineer and Governor of Russian America, 1859–1864;
- Furugelm Island – Island in Peter the Great Bay, Sea of Japan. Two islands discovered by Johan Hampus Furuhjelm in 1853. Named for him by the Russian Admiral Putyatin;
- Furuhelm Street – in Sitka, Alaska, located between Edgecumbe Drive and Georgeson Street, starting at Kimsham Street.
- Furugelm – A point and an island at Sakhalin, Sea of Japan. Named for Carl Harald Felix Furuhjelm, b. May 13, 1830 in Helsinki, Finland, d. April 30, 1871 in Nakhodka, East Siberia, Russia (brother of Johan Hampus Furuhjelm).

== Sources ==
- Энциклопедия Таганрога. Таганрог: Антон, 1998. — 624 с. — ISBN 5-88040-017-4.

Government offices
Preceded by acting governor Achilles Alferaki	Governors of Taganrog; 1874–1876	Succeeded by Pavel Maksutov
Preceded by Stepan Vasiliyevich Voyevodsky	Governor of Russian Colonies in America; 1859—1864	Succeeded by Dmitri Petrovich Maksutov
