= Green Lake (Alaska) =

Lake in the state of Alaska, United States

- Location within Alaska Location within North America
- Location: Sitka City and Borough, Alaska, United States
- Coordinates: 56°59′17″N 135°05′49″W
- Type: Reservoir, glacial lake
- Primary inflows: Vodopad River
- Primary outflows: Vodopad River
- Catchment area: 28.8 sq mi (75 km^{2})
- Basin countries: United States

Green Lake (Tlingit: Gageit' Tá) is a lake/reservoir south of Sitka, Alaska. It is fed by the Vodopad River and outflows into Silver Bay.

The Medvejie Fish Hatchery short-term rears smolt (juvenile salmon) in net pens in Green Lake.

The lake is artificially expanded by the Green Lake Dam. The rock-fill embankment dam is 1,130 feet (340 m) long. Annually Green Lake Dam generates about 60 gigawatt hours of electricity. Green Lake Dam works in tandem with the Blue Lake Dam to provide hydropower to Sitka.

Green Lake height before damming was 230 feet (70 m).

== Notes ==
- USGS Site information
