= Gmina Baranów =

Gmina Baranów may refer to any of the following rural administrative districts in Poland:

- Gmina Baranów, Greater Poland Voivodeship (west-central Poland)
- Gmina Baranów, Lublin Voivodeship (eastern Poland)
- Gmina Baranów, Masovian Voivodeship (east-central Poland)
