= Otto Wilhelm Furuhjelm =

Finnish general (1819–1883)

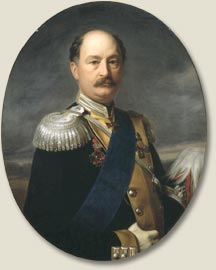
- Born: 1 June 1819; Turku, Grand Duchy of Finland, Russian Empire
- Died: 24 May [O.S. 12 May] 1883; Saint Petersburg, Russian Empire
- Occupation: General

Otto Wilhelmsson Furuhjelm (Russian: Оттон Васильевич Фуругельм, romanized: Otto Vasilyevich Furugelm; 1 June 1819 – 24 May 1883) was a Russian lieutenant-general of Finnish descent.

Furuhjelm was a Swedish-speaking Finn. He graduated from the Finnish Cadets Corps, and in 1839, enrolled the Life-Guards Semenovskiy Regiment (Семёновский лейб-гвардии полк). He was promoted to colonel in 1854, and was made the commander of the Yekaterinoslavsky Grenadeer Regiment at Yekaterinoslav (Екатеринославский гренадерский полк) in 1855. In 1858, he took charge of the Tavrichesky Grenadeer Regiment. In 1863, Otto Furuhjelm was promoted to the rank of mayor-general and commanded the Lithuanian Life Guards Regiment. In 1867, he was promoted to chief of the inspector's headquarters of rifle battalions (начальник штаба инспектора стрелковых батальонов). In this position, Otto W. Furuhjelm contributed to the rearmament of the Imperial Russian Army and earned the rank of lieutenant-general in 1871. He retired in late 1882.

Furuhjelm died in Saint Petersburg, Russian Empire.

== See also ==
- Johan Hampus Furuhjelm
- Karl Harald Felix Furuhjelm

== External links and references ==
- Helsinki kehyksissä - Käyttäjälle - Furuhjelm - Kuva 1
