= Hidden Falls (Baranof Island, Alaska) =

Archaeological site in Alaska, United States

Hidden Falls is an archaeological site that contains evidence for the earliest occupation in Southern Alaska along with evidence of marine resource usage. It is dated to the Archaic and Pacific period, between 9,500 and 1800 B.C.

== Background ==
Hidden Falls is located an elevation of 39 meters or 128 feet, south of Kelp Bay on Baranof Island, opposite Sitka, in Alaska. The site was first discovered by the U.S. Forest Service personnel with initial excavations occurring in 1978. Radiocarbon dating was conducted and demonstrated that people were living in Hidden Falls 10,000 years ago. There is evidence that the occupants of Hidden Falls produced stone tools that were associated with marine resources; the occupants relied on the ocean for their subsistence and transportation [6]. This site also produced evidence of different types of stone tools, which were categorized into three components, some of these included microblades and cobble stone tools

== Excavation and key findings ==
The Hidden Falls site was excavated by Stanley D. Davis in 1979 after the discovery of the site by the U.S. Forest Service.

Artifacts found in the site strata included: shell and faunal remains, slate knives, points, labrets, jade tools, bone tools, chipped stone, and drilled tooth pendants. The site consisted of three components. The first was characterized by microblades, unifacial tools and microcores dating to about 9,500 years ago. The second component was dated between 4600–3200 years ago and the third to ca. 3000–1300 years ago. The latter two components consisted of ground and slate tools

The deposits included shell midden and fire cracked debris. The upper levels did not appear to be true shell middens, since they only contained roughly 15-20% shell midden volume. The rainwater and groundwater at this site has been sufficient to create a uniform midden level, which aids in preservation of artifacts such as bone.

== Artifacts and technology ==
The artifacts discovered in the deepest levels are associated with the Archaic period (ca. 10,500-4,400 B.C.); these consisted of microblade techniques and cobble stone tools, including gravers and scrapers The origins of these stone tools are believed to have come from Siberia and became popular throughout Alaska. Dating was conducted on different strata deposits and it suggested that the stone tools were found to date approximately 9500 B.C. The excavation yielded different artifacts which contained utilized and non-utilized flakes, scrapers, microcores and pebble choppers. These artifacts were radiocarbon dated at 9860 ± 75. Many of these tools were primarily used for cutting, serrating, or hunting, such as the pebble chopper. The pebble chopper consisted of a rounded stone that was repeatedly hit with another stone to create a serrated crest that was used to chop subsistence resources or used as a crude hunting tool. The microblade was a tradition used by people that were likely specialized in fishing and sea hunting.

Microblades eventually disappear and a new set of tools began to emerge in the upper levels. These tools consisted of grounding stones and along with these tools came decorative artifacts, such as pendants, shells, beads, and labrets.

== Life at Hidden Falls ==
=== Hunting ===
Due to the fact that Hidden Falls is located on an island, the only way to proceed onto this location is from a boat. Also, due to its location, it is assumed that the inhabitants of the island relied heavily on the ocean and it production of marine resources. Artifact assemblages at this site are interpreted as resulting from the exploitation of marine resources. Although hunting terrestrial game most likely did occur, it was not the main food source.

=== Subsistence ===
The location of Hidden Falls suggests that many of its inhabitants relied on marine resources. Parts of toggling harpoons and some barbed bone points were found and are suggestive that sea mammal hunting occurred. Shellfish and traces of whale remains were found, although whale hunting was probably not as reliable and not practiced as often. However, there is not enough evidence to provide an accurate record of the daily or regular consumption of the site's occupants. Only minimal fish bones have been recovered at the site, and it is uncertain how much of the site occupants depended on them.

== Selected papers ==
Hidden Falls, a stratified site in southeast Alaska: Paper presented at the 32nd Annual Northwest Anthropological Conference. (Stanley Davis). 1979. Fairbanks, Alaska.

== Selected books ==
The Hidden Falls, Baranof Island, Alaska. (Stanley Davis). 1981. Alaska Anthropological Association. Anchorage, Alaska.
