= Baranof Lake =

Glacial Lake in Alaska

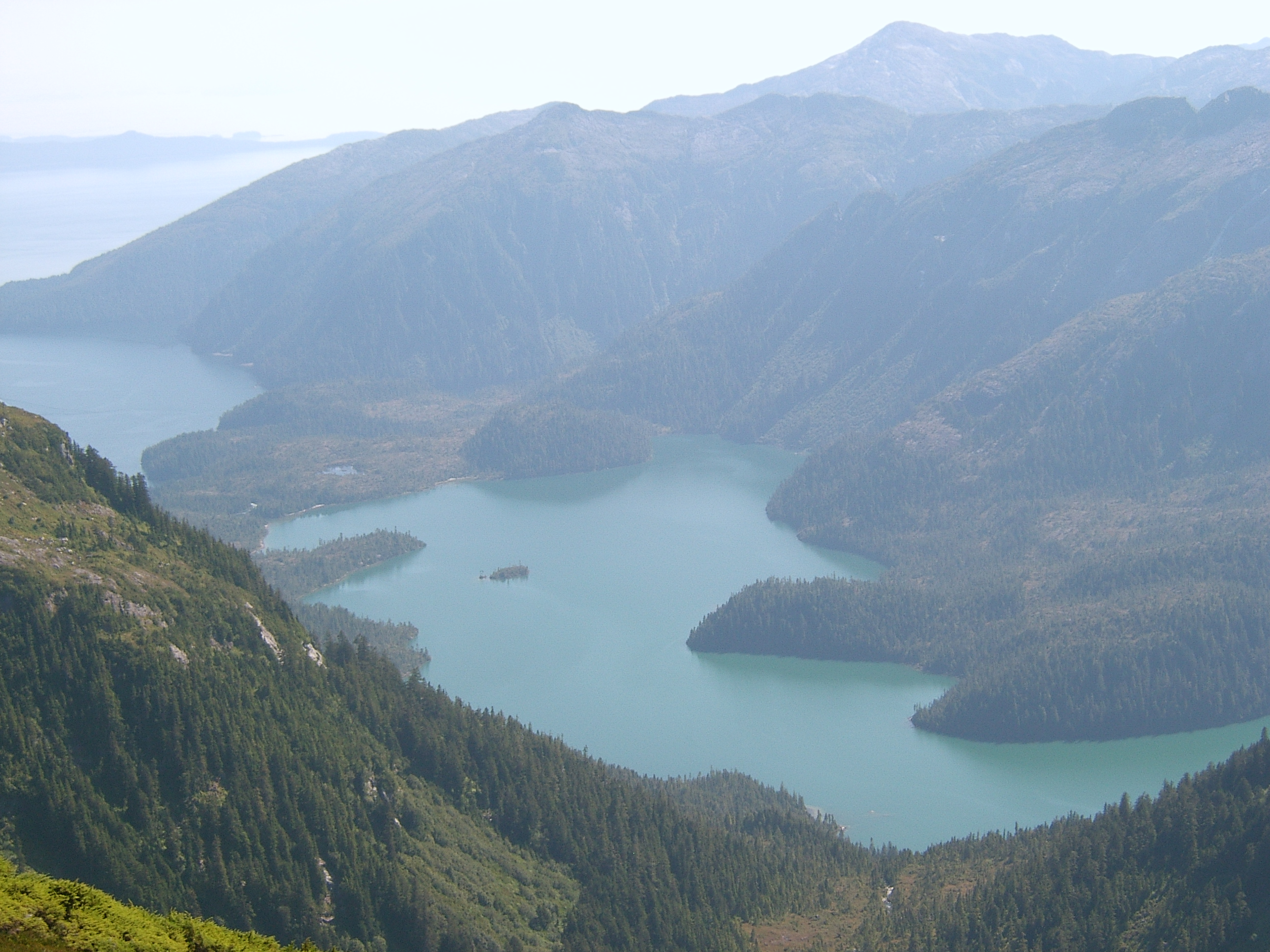
- A view southeast of the east half of Baranof Lake and part of Warm Springs Bay

- Location within Alaska Location within North America
- Location: Baranof Island, Sitka City and Borough, Alaska, US
- Coordinates: 57°05′15″N 134°51′57″W
- Lake type: Glacial lake
- Primary inflows: Baranof River
- Primary outflows: Baranof River
- Basin countries: United States
- Max. length: 3 mi (4.8 km)
- Max. width: 1,000–3,800 ft (300–1,160 m)
- Max. depth: 303 ft (92 m)
- Surface elevation: 145 ft (44 m)
- Settlements: Baranof Warm Springs

Baranof Lake is a glacially-fed, horseshoe-shaped lake on the eastern side of Baranof Island, in Alaska. Baranof Lake borders the community of Baranof Warm Springs and also has a Forest Service cabin on the northwestern end of the lake. Baranof River flows into the lake's western end and exits on the eastern end in rapids and a waterfall.

Baranof Lake was likely named for the community of Baranof Warm Springs.
