= Blue Lake (Alaska) =

Lake in the state of Alaska, United States

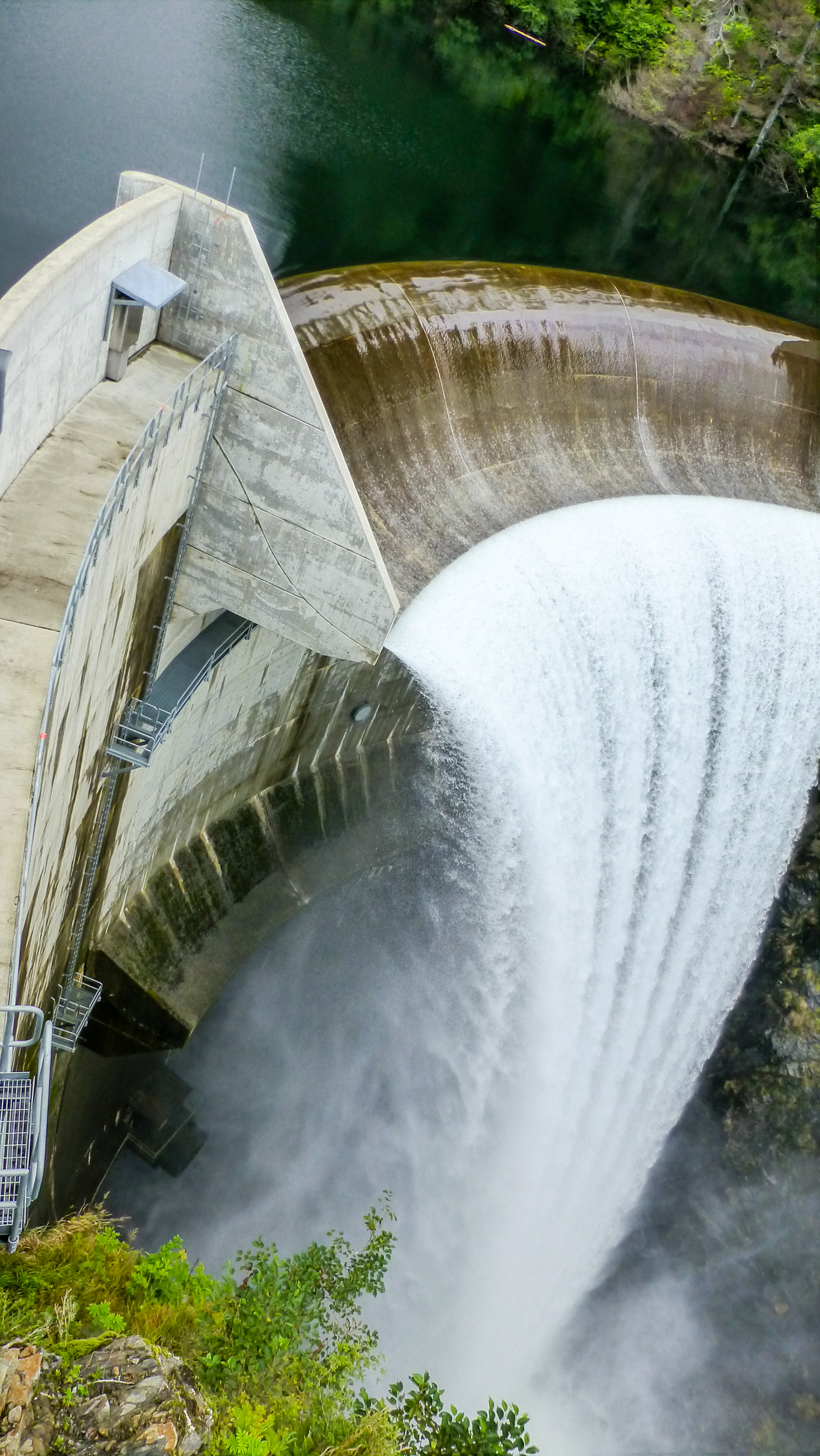
- Blue Lake Dam spillway in Sitka Alaska

- Location within Alaska Location within North America
- Location: Baranof Island, Sitka City and Borough, Alaska
- Coordinates: 57°04′24″N 135°09′46″W
- Type: Reservoir
- Primary inflows: Blue Lake Valley Creek
- Primary outflows: Sawmill Creek
- Basin countries: United States
- Max. length: 3 mi (4.83 km)
- Surface area: 1,225 acres (5 km^{2})
- Max. depth: 468 ft (143 m)
- Surface elevation: 436 ft (133 m)

Blue Lake (Tlingit: Gajook Héen Yik.áayi) is a 3 miles (4.8 km) long reservoir located 6 miles (9.7 km) east of the town of Sitka, on the west side of Baranof Island, in the Alexander Archipelago of Southeast Alaska.

== Name and geology ==
The local descriptive name was reported in 1910 by Knopf (1912, fig 4), in United States Geological Survey.

Blue Lake, as its name suggests, possesses a deep blue hue to its water. Blue Lake's water sources are partially from snowpack and small glaciers from the glacially carved, U-shaped, Blue Lake valley in which it lies.

== Dam ==
Blue lake was first dammed in 1913 by Sitka Wharf and Power Company. It sold its operation to the city in 1942. Floods damaged the infrastructure in 1943 and 1947.

Blue Lake was dammed again in 1958, greatly expanding the lake's size from 490 acres (2.0 km^{2}) to 1,225 acres (5 km^{2}) and increasing its height from 208 ft (63 m) to 342 ft (104 m). The dam is under construction as of 2024. It is being extended another 90 ft (27 m) feet higher. Dam fluctuations allow the lake elevation to vary up to 60 ft (18 m). The Blue Lake dam, along with the Green Lake Dam, combine to make Sitka's mainstream power sources exclusively hydroelectric.

Blue Lake Road is used to reach the lake from Sawmill Cove, allowing residents to use kayaks and canoes to more easily access peaks further up the Blue Lake valley, like Clarence Kramer Peak. Blue Lake Campground lies along this road. The road itself is very dangerous, often winding above cliff ledges. There are also many avalanche chutes located along the road which can pose a hazard or block it completely in winter.

== Water rights ==
Currently, at the Sawmill Cove Industrial Park, there is a small water bottling operation utilizing the water that originates from the watershed. Two other companies retain rights to export of the water in the future. In 2010 a Texas company S2C Global Systems announced that it was moving forward with a plan to ship 2.9 to 9 billion US gallons (11,000,000 to 34,000,000 m^{3}) of fresh lake water a year from Blue Lake to the west coast of India. The deal would represent the world's first regular, bulk exports of water via tanker. The water would be redistributed to places in India, southeast Asia and the Middle East. The town of Sitka could earn up to $90 million a year in revenue.

Between 2009 and 2021, the city of Sitka made about $1.4 million selling water rights. However, none of the efforts to export water from Blue Lake have been very successful. Alaska permits allow Sitka to export approximately 9.5 billion gallons of raw water annually. Currently, Sitka has only one active water purchase agreement for around 1 percent of that total allotment. This agreement has allowed Eckert Fine Beverages to export a few thousand gallons of Blue Lake water to a California subsidiary, Reigncane Vodka.
