= Medvejie Lake =

Lake in the state of Alaska, United States

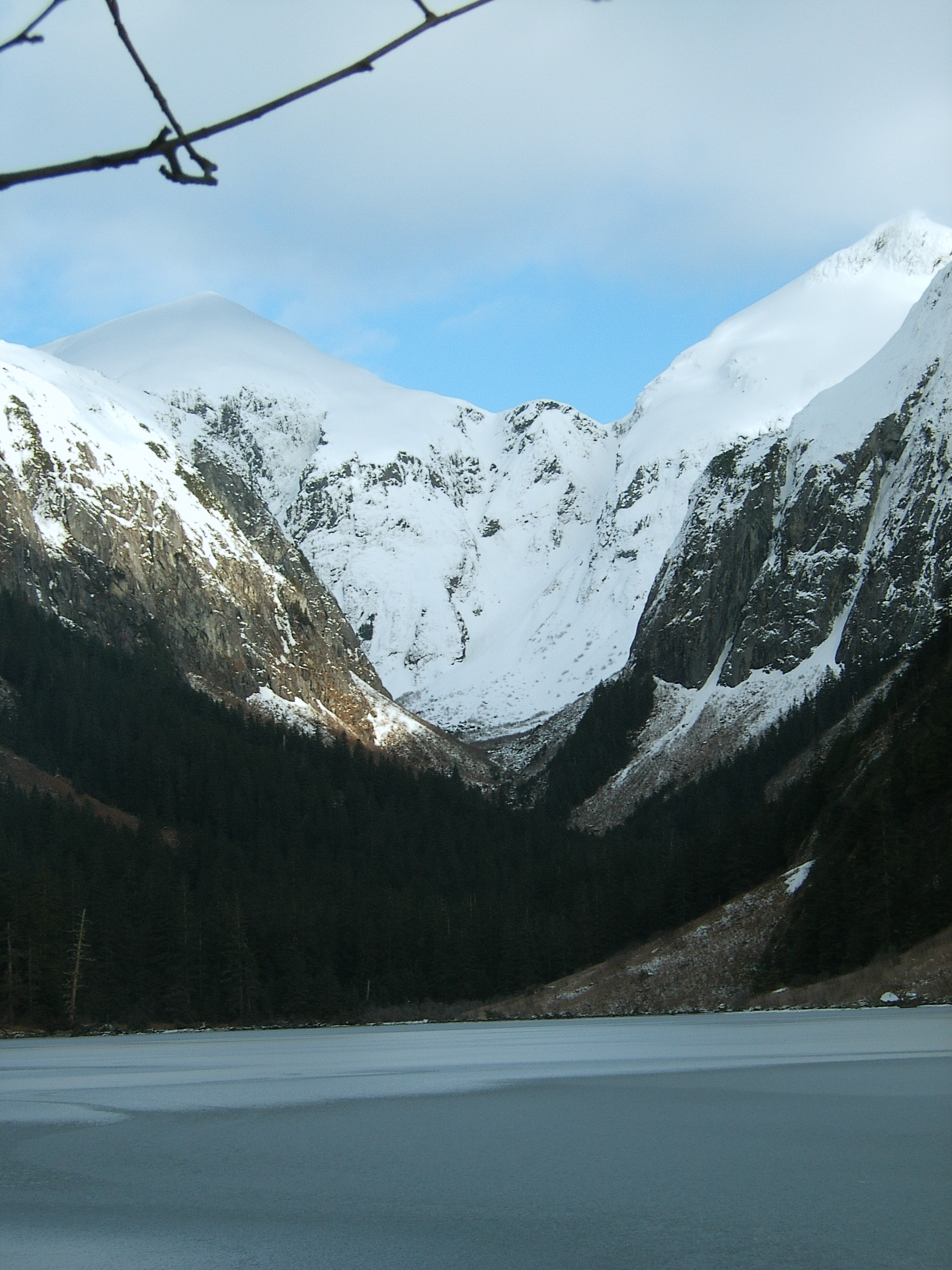
- Looking up from the Medvejie Lake valley from near the end of the frozen-over lake

- Location within Alaska Location within North America
- Location: Baranof Island, Sitka City and Borough, Alaska, United States
- Coordinates: 57°1′23″N 135°7′9″W
- Type: Glacial lake
- Basin countries: United States
- Max. length: 1 mi (1.6 km)
- Max. width: .2 mi (0.32 km)
- Surface elevation: 243 feet (74 m)

Medvejie Lake is a long, narrow, snow-fed lake on Baranof Island just south of Sitka, Alaska in the Alaskan Panhandle, which drains into Silver Bay, eight miles (13 km) southeast of Sitka, on west coast of Baranof Island, Alexander Archipelago.

== Etymology ==
Medvejie is derived from the Russian word meaning "bear." Most likely the lake's name comes as a holdover from Russian colonization of Alaska and the Sitka area.

Also known as:

- Bear Lake
- Medvejia Lake

== Geography ==
Medvejie Lake and the Medvejie Lake valley is nestled between the hulks of Bear Mountain and Cupola Peak at 243 feet (74 meters) of elevation. Little forested land exists between the mountains and shores of the lake owing to the precipitous rise of surrounding topography. As such, the geography of the area creates a narrow natural wind tunnel making blowdowns very common inside the valley. In the winter, with little or no water flowing into the lake due to all precipitation in the lake's watershed falling as snow, the lake usually freezes over and slowly shrinks into itself abandoning shards of ice that are strewn on the exposed former lakebottom. Medvejie Lake's outlet stream empties into Bear Cove, Silver Bay, and the Pacific Ocean.

== Temperature ==
The temperature in the Medvejie Lake valley, partly due to sunlight blocked by surrounding peaks (but also because of air cooled by snow from surrounding mountains and icefields that flows into the valley basin), is roughly five degrees colder than Sitka or the Medvejie Fish Hatchery's temperature. A salmon hatchery sits at the mouth of Medvejie Lake's roughly mile-long outlet stream.

== See also ==
- List of lakes of Alaska
