= Baranof River =

River in the United States of America

Coordinates: 57°04′08″N 134°53′55″W

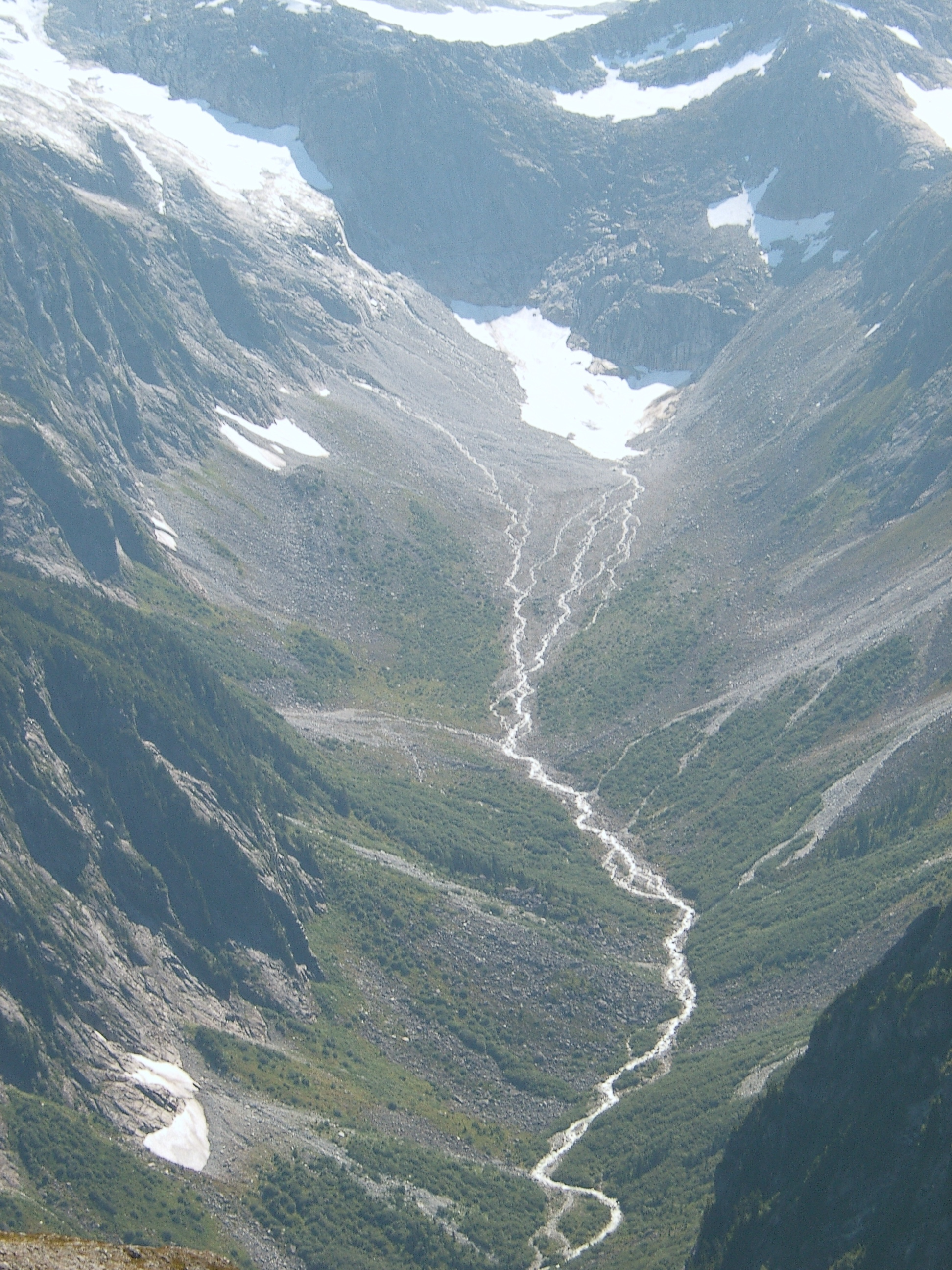
- The source of Baranof River.

Location
- Country: United States
- State: Alaska
- Region: Southeast Alaska
- City: Sitka

Physical characteristics
- Mouth
  - location: Alaska
- Length: 15 km (9.3 mi)
- Discharge
  - location: Warm Springs Bay
  - maximum: 4,170 cu ft/s (118 m^{3}/s)

Baranof River is a glacially-fed river on the eastern side of Baranof Island, in the Alexander Archipelago, in the Alaska Panhandle. The source of the river is the unnamed icefields surrounding Peak 5390. Baranof River feeds into Baranof Lake, and the outlet of Baranof Lake that feeds into Warm Springs Bay is also commonly referred to as Baranof River as well.

The maximum discharge measured, taken at the outflow of Baranof Lake, is 4,170 cu ft/s (118 m^{3}/s), recorded in September 1922.

Baranof River was named for Alexandr Baranov, the first governor of the Russian-American Company.

== See also ==
- List of Alaska rivers
