= Swan Lake (Alaska) =

Lake in the state of Alaska, United States

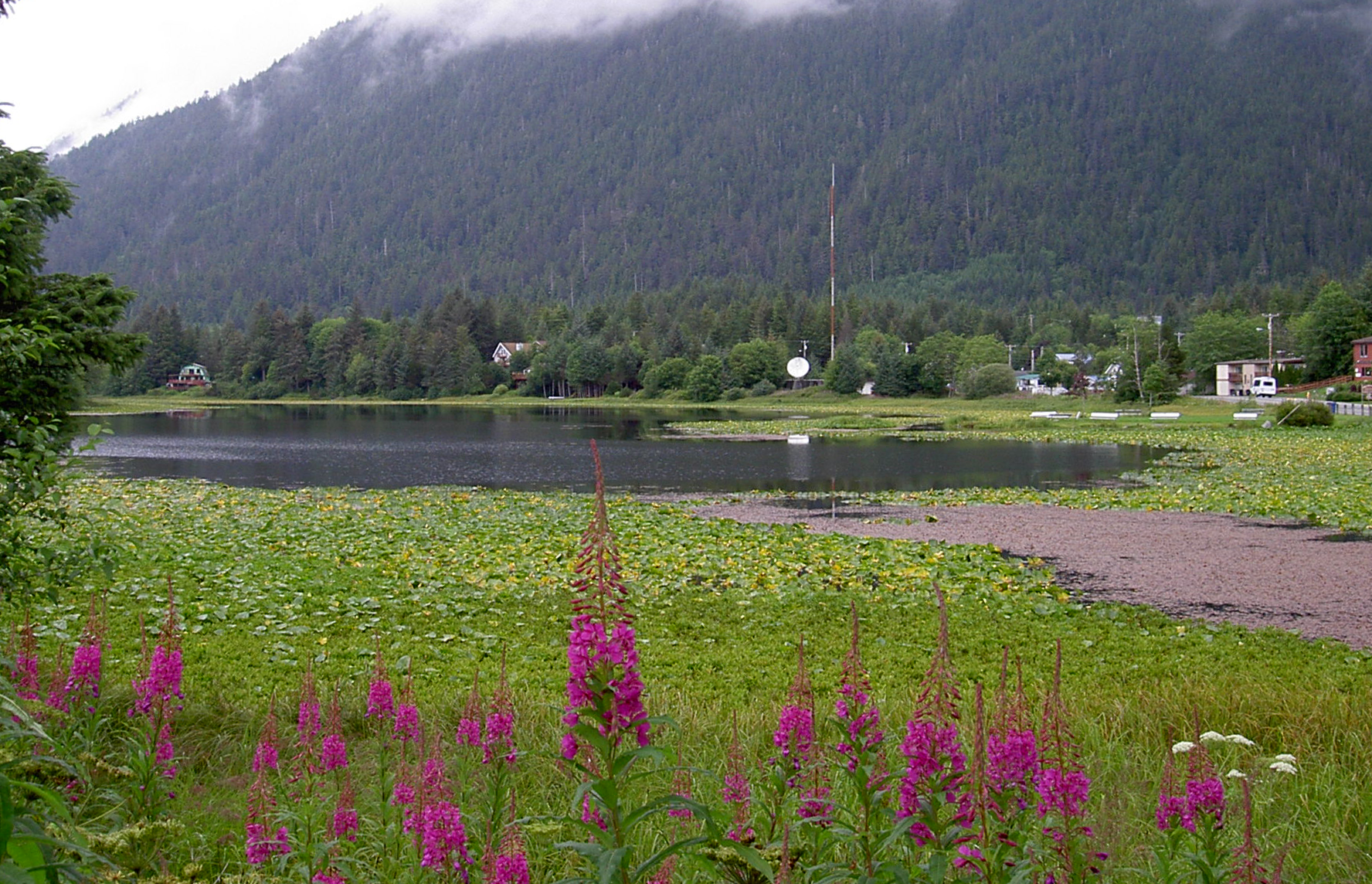
- Swan Lake in 2011

- Location within Alaska Location within North America
- Location: Baranof Island, Alaska
- Coordinates: 57°03′20″N 135°20′12″W
- Type: Artificial
- Primary inflows: Wrinkleneck Creek, Arrowhead Creek
- Primary outflows: Kettleson Memorial Library culvert
- Catchment area: 5 sq mi (13 km^{2})
- Basin countries: United States
- Max. length: .5 mi (0.80 km)
- Max. width: .1 mi (0.16 km)
- Surface area: 22 acres (89,000 m^{2})
- Average depth: 4.5 ft (1.4 m)
- Max. depth: 10 ft (3.0 m)
- Shore length^{1}: 6,600 ft (2,000 m)
- Settlements: Sitka, Alaska
- ^{1} Shore length is not a well-defined measure.

Swan Lake (Tlingit: X̱’wáat’ Héen Áakʼu), is a small lake located in the center of the town of Sitka, Alaska. It is a man-made lake, created during the Russian occupation of Alaska as an income source during the winter. Russians would export ice to southern communities in the Pacific Northwest. The crew of the USS Dixon AS-37 built improvements in June 1988.

Swan Lake contains rainbow trout, cutthroat trout and dolly varden. There is a small dock to fish from located on the east side of the lake.
