= Shakes (Tlingit leaders) =

Shakes or Chief Shakes is a distinguished Tlingit leadership title passed down through generations among groups of native people from Northwestern North America.

A construction called the Chief Shakes Tribal House is a registered site per the Federal US National Park Service (NPS) which regularly features on websites advertising tourist experiences in the relevant region of Alaska. Purportedly the modern construction is a reconstruction established in 1940 of an earlier structure made by the Tlingit Indigenous Americans themselves and seated members of the royal line.

== Lineages of the Shakes ==
=== Origin ===
The orphan Gush X’een (translation: Dorsal Fin Screen, English: Gushklin) lived at Ch’aal’in. He was a Teikweidí named Joonák’w. The leader of the Naanya.aayí, Suncock, took a liking to the orphaned boy and raised him as a nephew. Upon the death of Suncock, he became the leader of the clan.

The Stikine area was being invaded by the Naaskwaan (literally the Nass River People, i.e. the Nisga'a but here including the Tsimshian). The leaders of the invaders were Wiisheyksh (Wii Seeks), Yaxweiyxsh and Xagáksh.

Wiisheiyksh asked for access to the Stikine so that they might fish. Gush X’een refused and Wiisheyksh threatened to take the land by force if they were not allowed access. Upon leaving they took the burial pole of the Naanya.áayi leader, Shaadeistí, who had died not long before.

The Naanya.aayi prepared for war. Their íxt’ (shaman) told them when the Nisga'a were approaching. The Naanya.aayí moved to the mouth of the Stikine. Gush X’een ordered some of his men to stand at the base of the cliffs near the mouth of the river. The rest of the clan and those fighting with them retreated by the islands at the mouth of the river.

More than 100 Northwest Coast canoes full of Nisga'a warriors approached the Naanya.aayí at the mouth of the river. Wiisheyksh, wearing emblems of the killer whale and a headdress with the killer whale emblem disembarked and approached Gush X’een.

He remarked on how foolish Gush X’een was to position himself at a point of no-retreat implying that he was trapped. He told Gush X’een, “Today you will carry my water for me.” indicating that he intended Gush X’een to be his slave. Gush X’een signaled his men and hundreds of canoes came out from the surrounding islands and Gush X’een responded to Wiisheyksh, “Today, it is you who will be carrying my water for me.”

The battle started. The Naanya.áayi killed 150 Nishga. Wiisheyksh knew he could not win that battle and did not want to be the slave of Gush X’een so he gave the killer whale headdress to Gush X’een.

Gush X’een placed the hat on his own head said, “Not only do I take your hat, I take your name as well.” Wiisheyksh became a Tlingit name of the Naanya.aayí and was shortened to Sheiyksh, pronounced Shakes.

A proper burial was held for these invaders from the Tsimshian villages of Mitlagaatla, Giitgáatla and Wakuutl’, members of the Laxsibuu and Giitxaangiik clans. Warriors on the opposite side of the battle were given full burial honors by the Naanya.aayí, who believed in the Tlingit principle of Woosh yáa awudaéi or “Respect For Each Other.” Dying in battle was a courageous act the Shx’at Kwaan respected. After the cremation ceremonies the Naanya.aayí loaded two canoes full of provisions and sent the Nisga'a home, well fed, and properly cared for.

A year later the Naanya.aayi learned that the Nisga'a were returning. They moved to Lúkaax (Little Duncan Canal) and prepared for battle. The Nisga'a got stuck on the flats and announced from their canoes they wanted peace. A peace ceremony was held and names from both sides were given at this peace ceremony, and the title of "Shakes" was transferred at this time.

Names given at the peace ceremony were: Wandziiguuxshú, Gooxshú, and Yaskámtuuwaa.

=== Successors ===
After Gush X’een died, the title of Shakes passed on to his “maternal nephew”, his sister’s oldest son, Gookshí, who became Shakes II. The title passed to his younger brother X’adanéik who was also known as Tl’akwu Sheiyksh or Shaawát Chooku Éesh (Short Woman, Father. His wife was a Gaanaxteidí; woman from Tlakw Aaan (Klukwan) named Yoowduhaan.

His successor, Shakes IV, was known as Keishíshk’ whose wife was S’eitlin, a Deisheetaan (Gaanax.ádi) woman from Aan goon (Angoon). When this woman married, she walked across eight tin.aa (coppers) at her wedding.

Upon his death; he was succeeded by Kaawishté who became Shakes V, who moved the village site from Kaasitl Aan to Kaachx’ Aan Aak’w, its present-day site. He held the title of Shakes longer than any others and died in 1878.

He was succeeded in turn by his own maternal nephew, Gush Tlein, whose mother was Koodeilgé and he became Shakes VI in 1878 upon the death of Shakes V and died in 1916. His nephew, Charlie Jones, succeeded him.

== Twentieth century ==
Charlie Jones was arrested in 1922 for voting. Native Americans were not automatically considered U.S. citizens at that time. In 1924, when legislation was passed granting them citizenship, voting rights were not ensured, but two-thirds had already gained the franchise through moves off reservations and other actions. Upon being tried in court, and represented by the famous Tlingit attorney from Wrangell, Mr. William Paul (Shkúndee) of the Teehítaan Clan, Jones was acquitted and Indians were given the right to vote. This was a time of strong missionary influence, especially by the Presbyterian Church, which tried to repress the Tlingit culture, customs, and language, punishing students in white schools for speaking their native language and jailing parents who kept their children at fish camps instead of sending them to “white schools”.

Adults who participated in their own culture's activities were banned from the church, dis-fellowshipped, and ostracized.

In Wrangell, the Presbyterian Church had a large Native congregation. One white minister decided that the Indians should have their own church so the whites wouldn’t have to mingle with them. The entire Native congregation, insulted by this move, moved out of the Presbyterian Church and invited the Episcopal Church into Wrangell, where it remains a strong influence to this day.

One of the "white" laws was that property and titles might no longer be passed from uncle to nephew in the traditional way, only from father to son. As a result, the widow of Shakes VI kept almost all of the property of her husband and would not allow his nephew to take it. It was sold piece by piece.

In the 1930s the Civilian Conservation Corps decided to build a model community house in the old style, as there were some elders alive then who still remembered how they were built. The site selected in Wrangell was “Shakes Island”, where the main clan houses of the Naanya.áayi once stood. Charlie Jones was the known successor to Shakes VI and was asked to formally accept the title of Shakes VII.

== List of Shakes ==
Name	Term	Title
Gush X'een		Shakes I
Gookshí		Shakes II
X’adanéik		Shakes III
Keishíshk'		Shakes IV
Kaawishté	1840–1878	Shakes V
Gush Tlein	1878–1916	Shakes VI
Charlie Jones	1916–1944	Shakes VII the last known chief

== See also ==
- Sheet'ká Ḵwáan Naa Kahídi
