= Sitka Public Library =

Public library of Sitka, Alaska

Coordinates: 57.049717°N 135.334825°W

Sitka Library
- Location: 320 Harbor Dr. Sitka, Alaska, United States
- Type: Public library
- Established: 1923

Collection
- Size: 57,677

Access and use
- Circulation: 87,884
- Population served: 8,523

Other information
- Website: City library website

Sitka Public Library is the public library for Sitka, Alaska.

It receives about 100,000 guests annually and houses a collection of 75,000 books, audiobooks, music recordings, reference resources, videos (DVD and VHS) as well as an assortment of Alaskan and national periodicals. Its annual circulation is 133,000. It has the largest per capita circulation in the state of towns with populations over 2,500 people.

The library is well known by visitor populations for its view. The large windows in front of the reading area look south across Eastern Channel towards the Pyramids. The youth section of the library has a 100 square-foot mural of children's story characters that was completed in 1986.

== History ==
The library was moved into its current building in 1968 after a gift from Theodore Kettleson, a San Diego resident and shareholder in Sitka Cold Storage, enabled local organizers to begin raising funds from state and federal sources to construct a concrete building.

The library opened on the March 20, 1923 under the name of the Sitka Public Library. Previous European-language libraries in Sitka had either destroyed or been sold to other libraries on the north west coast of North America. The library was moved ten times and survived fire twice before coming to its current location under the name of Kettleson Memorial Library. In 2015 the library commission moved to change the name back to the Sitka Public Library during a renovation and expansion project.
