= Saint Lazaria Island =

Wildlife refuge in Alaska, United States

Coordinates: 56°59′14″N 135°42′17″W

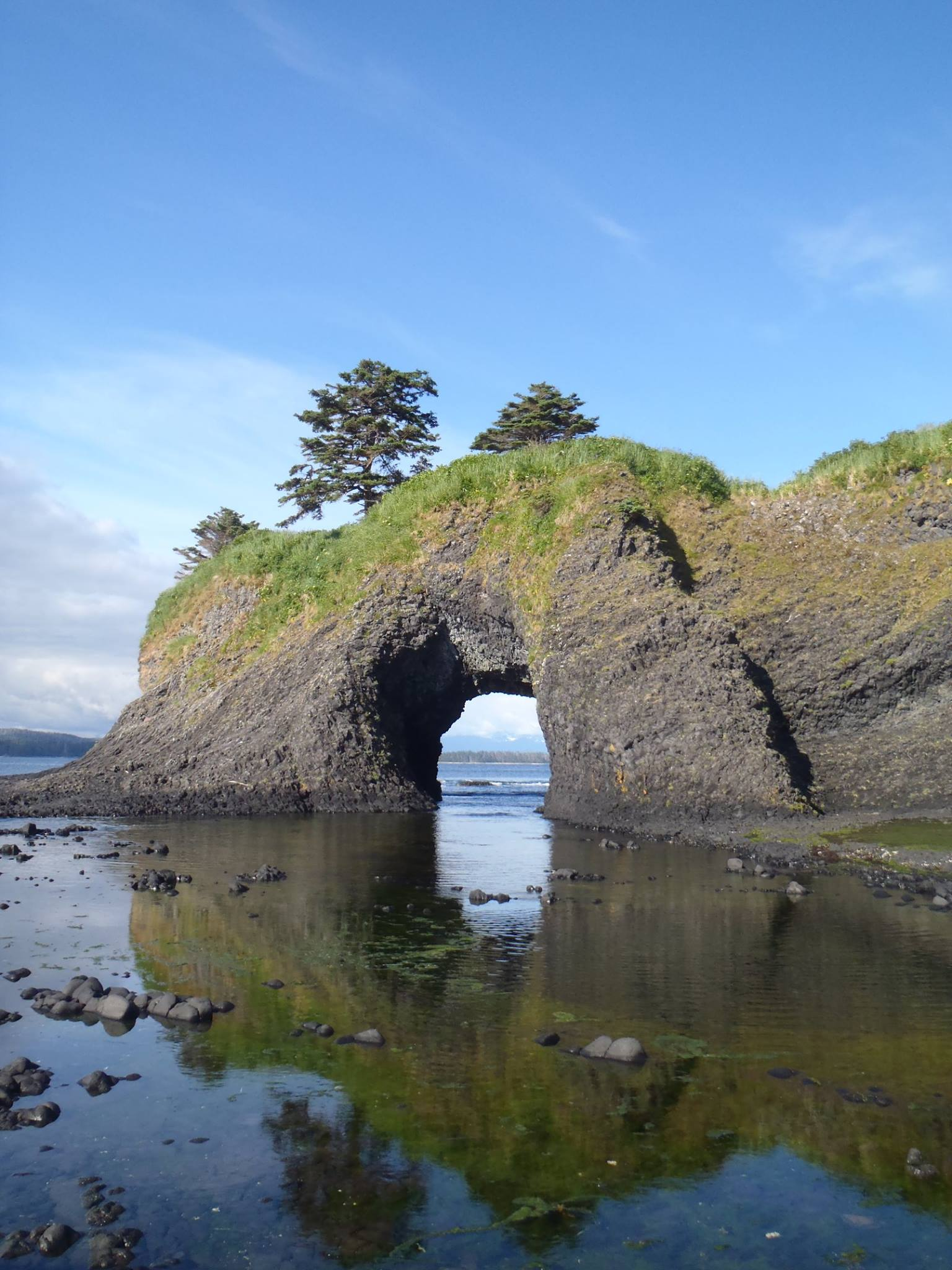
Rock arch on Saint Lazaria

St. Lazaria Island is a nesting bird colony located twenty miles (32 km) west of Sitka, Alaska. It is a part of the Gulf of Alaska unit of the Alaska Maritime National Wildlife Refuge and is protected as the Saint Lazaria Wilderness. It is located in Sitka Sound, just south of Kruzof Island, and within the limits of the City and Borough of Sitka, Alaska. The island's name is Kanasx'ée in the Tlingit language.

== Island geography ==
St. Lazaria is a very rugged looking island with limited and difficult access. Its direct exposure to the Pacific Ocean makes it ideal for birds to inhabit. Most likely the island is a volcanic plug — the remnants of an old and eroded volcano — which would make St. Lazaria an older volcanic cousin to the adjacent Mount Edgecumbe on Kruzof Island.

The island itself is low with broken terrain due to its volcanic origins. Its highest point is 160 feet (49 m) above sea level and there are two small summits on the island with a low, treeless saddle connecting the two that can often be overcome by waves during storms and at high tide. There are many cliffs that can get up to 90 feet (27 m) tall and shoot strait into the ocean as well as sea-level caves that can be explored on a calm day by thrill-seeking individuals in small craft.

== Refuge history ==
St. Lazaria Island is just one of the 2,500 islands throughout Alaska that comprise the Alaska Maritime Wildlife Refuge. It was originally designated as a "refuge for seabirds" in 1909, and received official wilderness designation from congress in 1970. Saint Lazaria National Wildlife Refuge was added to the Alaska Maritime National Wildlife Refuge in 1980.

== Flora and fauna ==
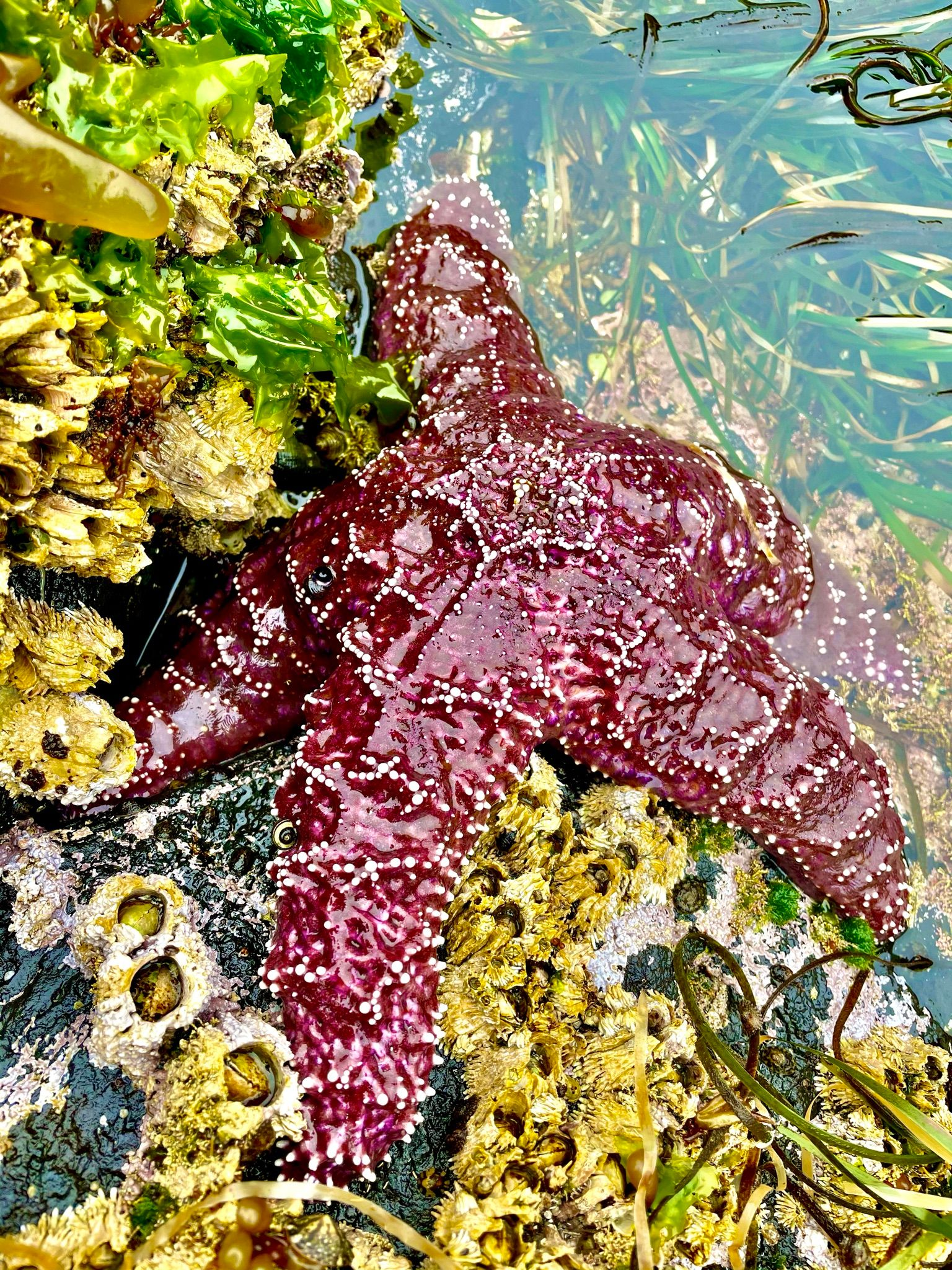
Ochre Sea Star

Just about all the wildlife on St. Lazaria is birds. On the island there are:

- 250,000 breeding pairs of fork-tailed storm-petrels and Leach's storm-petrels.
- 4-5,000 common and thick-billed murres.
- 1,500-2,000 breeding pairs of tufted puffins.
- 1,000 breeding pairs of rhinoceros auklets.

Other less populous species include: pigeon guillemots, glaucous-winged gulls, ancient murrelets, Cassin's auklets, bald eagles, peregrine falcons, and black oystercatchers.

In nesting areas on the island, the bird density can reach 7000 birds per acre.

The only trees on the island are Sitka Spruce which are located at the highest points of elevation.

== Visiting ==
It is a popular day boat-trip for Sitkans or a place to cruise around for fishermen already in the area. St. Lazaria is not supposed to be visited by foot from anyone other than permitted scientists as every square foot of ground contains burrows for nesting birds and can be easily crushed, disturbed, or destroyed. However, over 2,000 people a year visit the island by boat circling around the volcanic hulk — admiring its birds, cliffs, caves, and other volcanic landforms. Small and large-scale tour operators alike make St. Lazaria a popular and well-known tourist destination in Sitka.
