= Jeffrey Solow =

American cellist (born 1949)

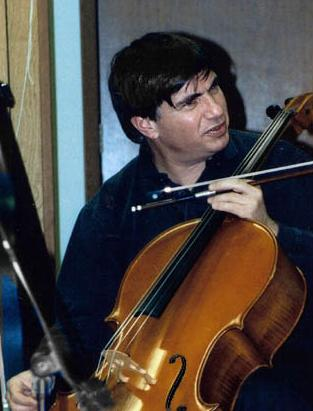
- Solow in Homer, Alaska

Background information
- Born: January 3, 1949 (age 77); Los Angeles, California
- Genre: Classical
- Occupation: Cellist
- Instrument: Cello
- Years active: 1960's-present
- Labels: ABC, Capstone, Centaur, Columbia, Delos, Everest, Kleos, Laurel, New World, Telefunken
- Website: www.jeffreysolow.com

Jeffrey Solow (born January 3, 1949) is an American cellist.

== Biography ==
Born in Los Angeles, Solow began cello lessons at the age of 7 with Gregory Aller, the grandfather of Leonard Slatkin, and had further studies with Gabor Rejto. He studied with and was assistant to Gregor Piatigorsky while pursuing a degree in Philosophy at the University of California, Los Angeles. In 1969 he won the Young Concert Artists International Auditions which led to his New York City recital debut at Carnegie Recital Hall. Since then he has appeared as a soloist with many orchestras including the Los Angeles Philharmonic, the Japan Philharmonic, the Seattle Symphony, the Milwaukee Symphony, the Los Angeles Chamber Orchestra and the American Symphony Orchestra, the latter of which he has also recorded with. Two of his recordings were nominated for Grammy Awards and he has made recordings on the Columbia Records, ABC Records, Centaur Records, Delos Records, Kleos Records, Everest Records and Telefunken music labels.

Solow has also worked actively as a chamber musician and is a former member of The Amadeus Trio as well as the American Chamber Players. He has performed as a chamber musician at music festivals including the Spoleto Festival, the Newport Music Festival, the Santa Fe Chamber Music Festival, the Sitka Summer Music Festival, the Summit Music Festival, the Montecito Music Festival, the Park City International Music Festival and the Marlboro Festival. He also spent eight summers teaching cello and chamber music at the Chautauqua Institute in New York.
