= Sitka Summer Music Festival =

Classical music festival in Sitka, Alaska

Coordinates: 57.049901°N 135.333442°W

The Sitka Summer Music Festival is a month-long classical chamber music festival in Sitka, Alaska.

== About ==
The festival takes place in early summer during the month of June with three groupings of musicians. Each group of musicians performs three concerts before a new group arrives to perform the next three concerts.

Each season of the festival consists of around ten evening concerts, the centerpieces of the festival, as well as several free, informal "brown bag" concerts and multiple fundraising events and cruises.

All the evening concerts occur at the breathtaking venue of Harrigan Centennial Hall, in downtown Sitka. While it is not an auditorium (rather, the main hall of a convention/civic center), its glass-panel backdrop reveals a clear view of Crescent Harbor, Eastern Channel and its assortment of small, tree-covered islands dotting its water, snow-capped mountains, and an occasional bald eagle swooping down from the sky.

The organization's offices are located in Stevenson Hall on the campus of the former Sheldon Jackson College in Sitka. Stevenson Hall is part of the National Historic Landmark District created in 2001. The hall was built in 1911 as part of the central campus.

The festival's sheet music library is housed in Stratton Library, also on the campus of the former Sheldon Jackson College.

The artistic director is Zuill Bailey.

== Other series ==
The festival also offers a series of Autumn and Winter Classics at Alaska Pacific University in Anchorage, where the festival's full-time office is located. During February and June the festival also offers a winter and summer touring series sending a small group of musicians (a piano quintet at most) to a number of small, usually rural communities throughout the state. The winter series visits different communities each year, Sitka notwithstanding, which always hosts the finale concert.

== History ==
The festival began in 1972 as an informal musical reunion, organized by Paul Rosenthal, of the students of Jascha Heifetz and Gregor Piatigorsky from the University of Southern California. Their concerts were a success and the reunion became an annual festival directed by Rosenthal, growing larger throughout the years. The Autumn and Winter Classics in Anchorage were begun in 1980 and have also continued since.

The festival went virtual in 2020 as officials blamed the COVID-19 pandemic as grounds for cancelling live concerts.

== Musicians ==
While there have been 110 festival musicians since its inception in 1972, a list of the more notable musicians classified by instrument is below:

=== Bassoon ===
- Patricia Kindel

=== Cello ===
- Zuill Bailey
- Anthony Elliott
- Denise Djokic
- Godfried Hoogeveen
- Gregor Piatigorsky
- Nathaniel Rosen
- Peter Rejto
- Stephen Kates
- Toby Saks
- Jeffrey Solow

=== Clarinet ===
- Eli Eban
- Michael Webster
- Russell Harlow

=== Double bass ===
- David Brown
- Jeff Levine

=== Flute ===
- Leone Buyse
- Lorna McGhee
- Maria Piccinini
- Donna Stewart

=== Guitar ===
- Jack Sanders
- Simon Wynberg

=== Harp ===
- Nancy Allen
- Rita Costanzi

=== Horn ===
- Francis Orval
- Robert Routch

=== Oboe ===
- Allan Vogel

=== Piano ===
- Arnulf von Arnim
- Doris Stevenson
- Edward Auer
- Phillip Bush
- Jerome Lowenthal
- Sung Mi-Im
- Ursula Oppens

=== Viola ===
- Atar Arad
- David Harding
- Marcus Thompson
- Milton Thomas
- Paul Neubauer
- Rainer Moog
- Randolph Kelly
- Toby Hoffman
- Leslie Harlow

=== Violin ===
- Andres Cardenes
- Arturo Delmoni
- Charles Castleman
- Christiaan Bor
- Diane Monroe
- Gwen Thompson
- Ik-Hwan Bae
- Martin Beaver
- Paul Rosenthal
- Philippe Djokic

A full list of musicians.
