= Sitka, Alaska =

Consolidated city-borough in Alaska, US

Sitka Sheetʼká (Tlingit) Ситка (Russian)
- Consolidated city-borough
- City and Borough of Sitka
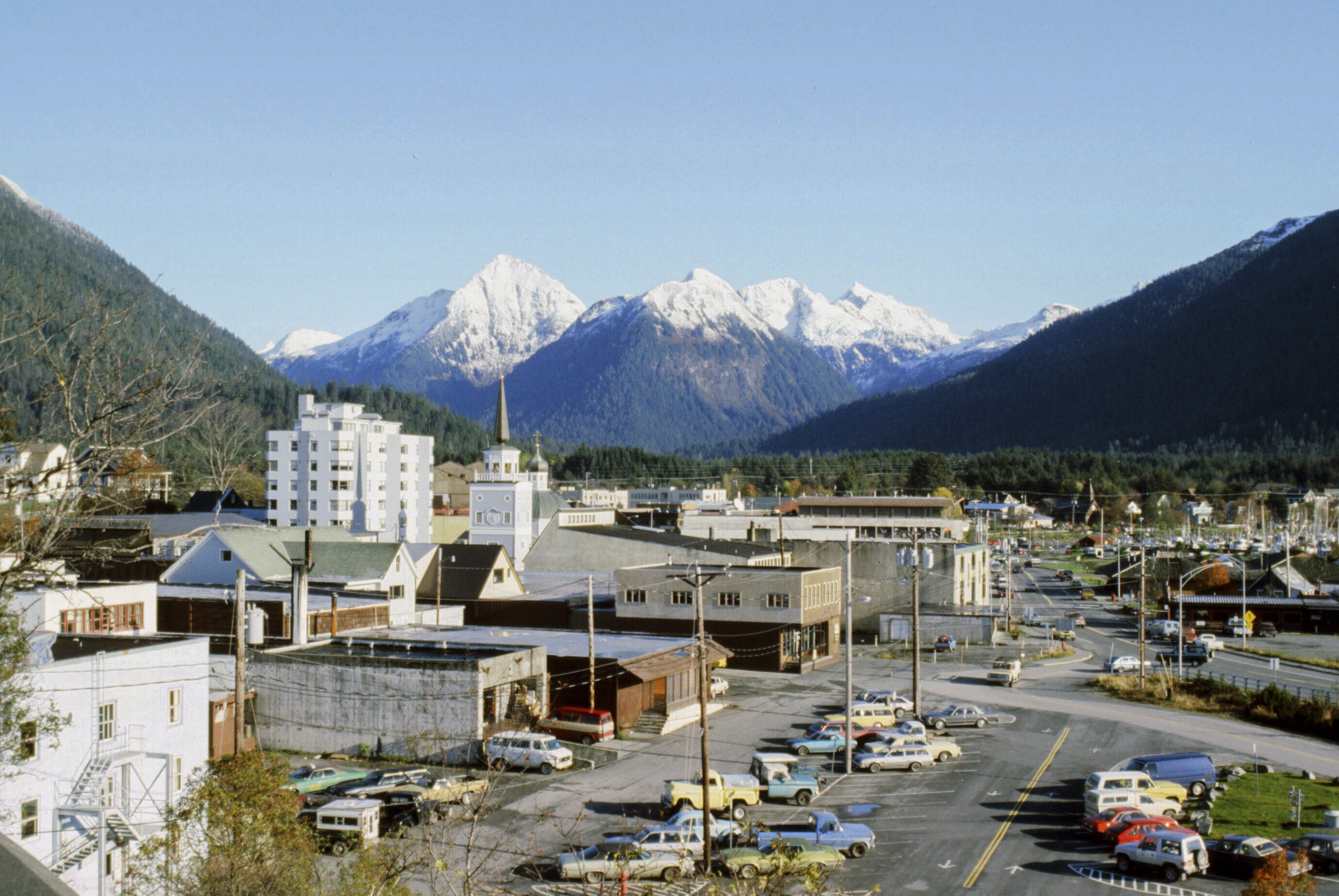
- Downtown Sitka in 1984

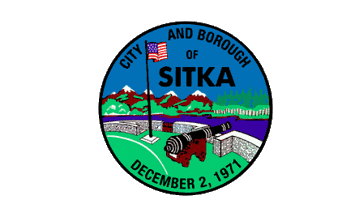
- Flag Seal

- Coordinates: 57°03′12″N 135°20′05″W
- Country: United States
- State: Alaska
- Colonized: 1799, 1804
- Incorporated: November 5, 1913 (city); September 24, 1963 (borough); December 2, 1971 (unified municipality)
- Named for: Tlingit for "People on the outside of Shee"

Government
  - Mayor: Steven Eisenbeisz
  - State senator: Bert Stedman (R)
  - State rep.: Rebecca Himschoot (I)

Area
  - Consolidated city-borough: 4,815.14 sq mi (12,471.16 km^{2})
  - Land: 2,870.06 sq mi (7,433.42 km^{2})
  - Water: 1,945.09 sq mi (5,037.75 km^{2})
  - Urban: 1.9 sq mi (5 km^{2})
- Elevation: 26 ft (8 m)

Population (2020)
  - Consolidated city-borough: 8,458
  - Estimate (2025): 8,319 ▼
  - Density: 2.947/sq mi (1.138/km^{2})
  - Urban: 7,668
- Time zone: UTC-9 (Alaska (AKST))
  - Summer (DST): UTC-8 (AKDT)
- ZIP Code: 99835
- Area code: 907
- FIPS code: 02-70540
- GNIS feature ID: 1414736
- Website: cityofsitka.com

Sitka (Tlingit: Sheetʼká; Russian: Ситка) is a unified city-borough in the southeast portion of the U.S. state of Alaska. It was under Russian rule from 1799 to 1867. The city is situated on the west side of Baranof Island and the south half of Chichagof Island in the Alexander Archipelago of the Pacific Ocean (part of the Alaska Panhandle). As of the 2020 census, Sitka had a population of 8,458, making it the fifth-most populated city in the state.

With a consolidated land area of 2,870.3 square miles (7,434 square kilometers) and total area (including water) of 4,811.4 sq mi (12,461 km^{2}), Sitka is the largest city by total area in the U.S.

== History ==
=== Etymology ===
Under Russian rule, it was known as New Arkhangelsk (Russian: Ново-Архангельск, romanized: Novo-Arkhangelsk, lit. 'New Archangel').

The current name, Sitka (derived from Sheetʼká, a contraction of the Tlingit Shee Atʼiká), means "People on the Edge of Shee", with Shee being the Tlingit name for Baranof Island (the Tlingit name for the island is Sheetʼ-ká Xʼáatʼl but is often contracted to Shee).

=== Russian America ===
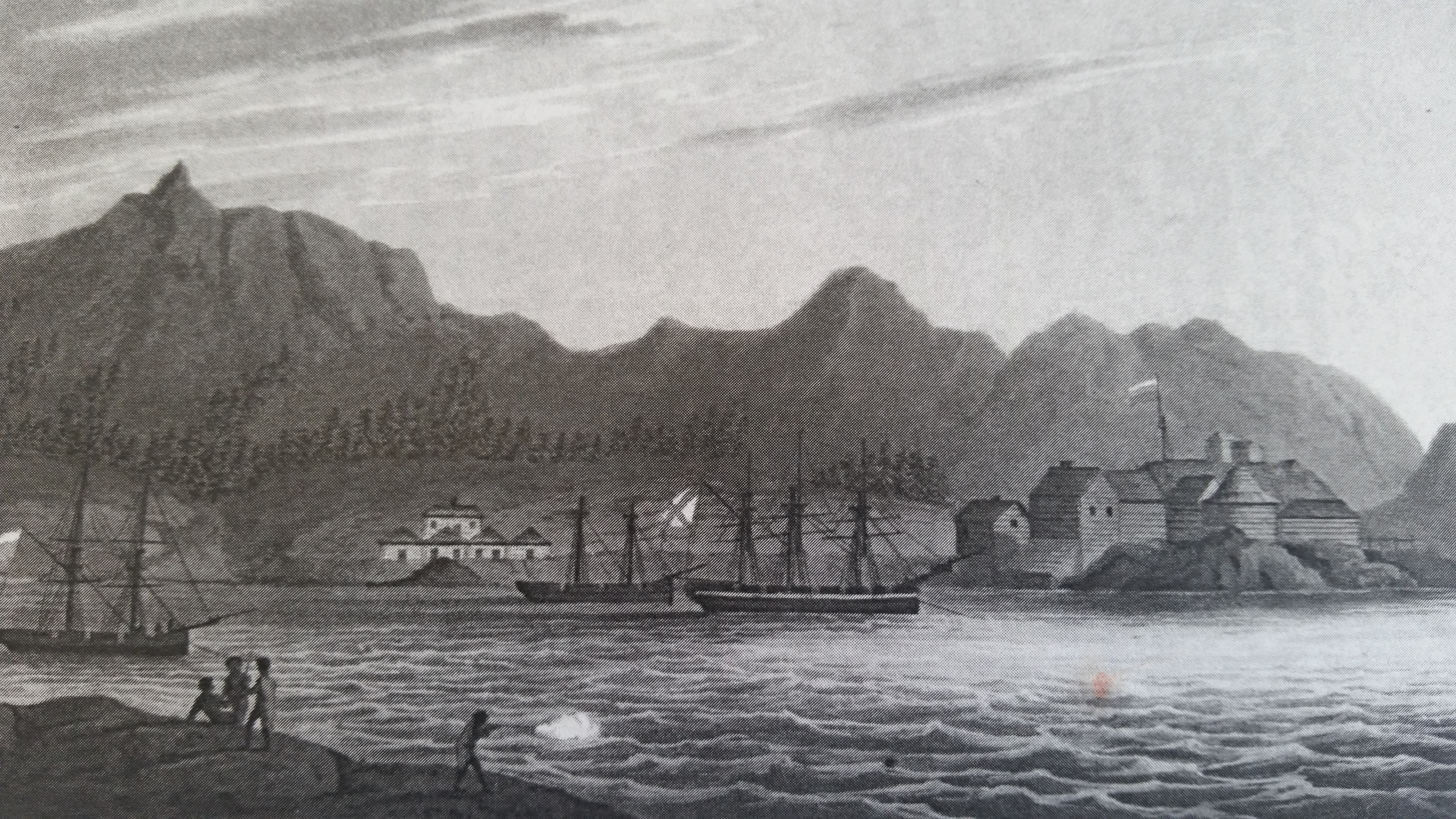
New Archangel, 1805

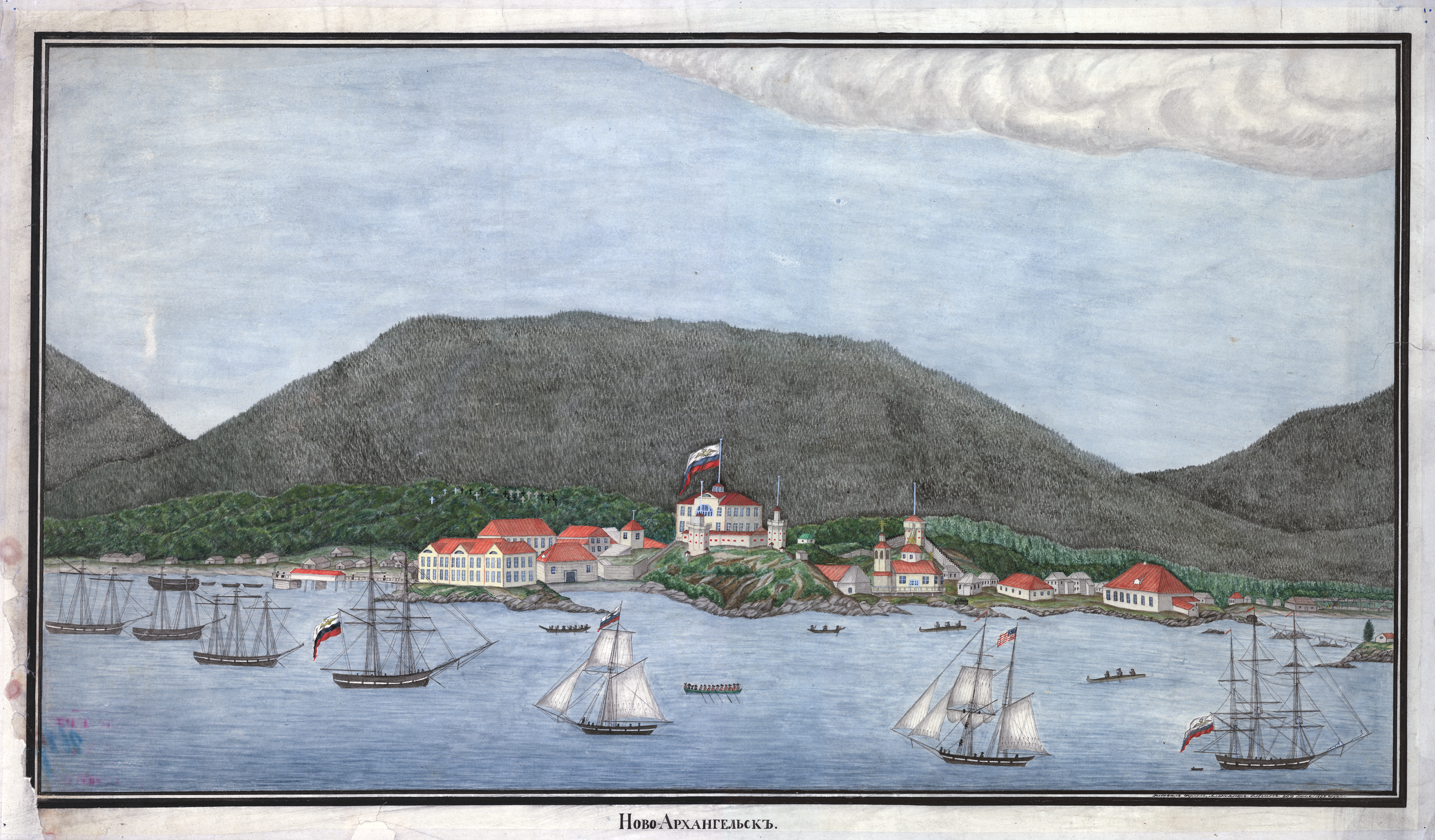
The Russian-American Company's capital at Novo Arkhangelsk in 1837

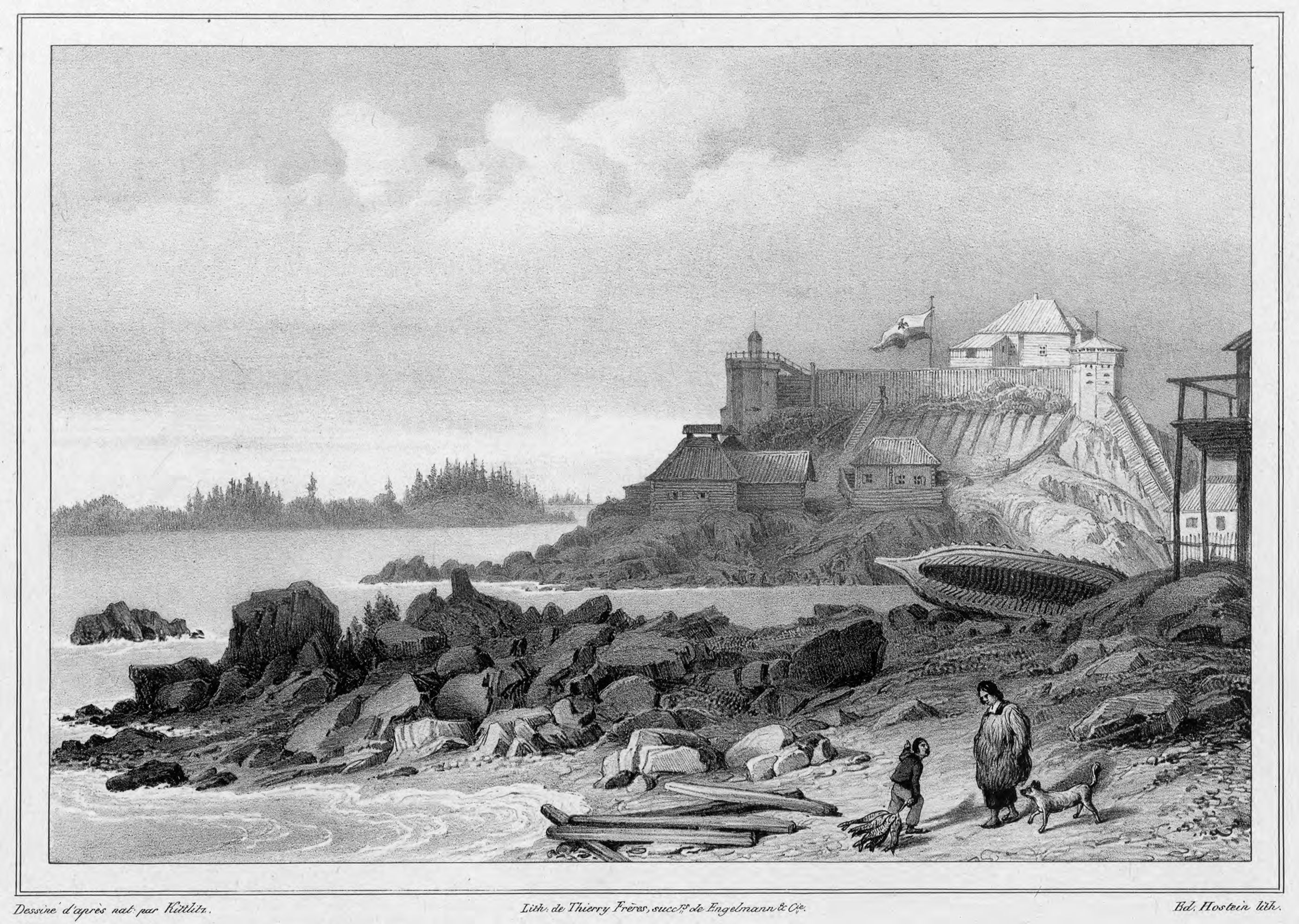
Gajaa Héen (Old Sitka), c. 1827. The new Russian palisade atop "Castle Hill" (Noow Tlein) that surrounded the Governor's Residence had three watchtowers, armed with 32 cannons, for defense against Tlingit attacks.

Russian explorers settled Old Sitka in 1799, naming it the Fort of Archangel Michael (Russian: форт Архангела Михаила, romanized: Fort Arkhangela Mikhaila). The governor of Russian America, Alexander Baranov, arrived under the auspices of the Russian-American Company, a colonial trading company chartered by Russian emperor Paul I. In June 1802, Tlingit warriors destroyed the original settlement, killing many of the Russians, with only a few managing to escape. Baranov was forced to levy 10,000 rubles in ransom to Captain Barber of the British sailing ship Unicorn for the safe return of the surviving settlers.

Baranov returned to Sitka in August 1804 with a large force, including Yuri Lisyansky's Neva. The ship bombarded the Tlingit fortification on the 20th but was not able to cause significant damage. The Russians then launched an attack on the fort and were repelled. Following two days of bombardment, the Tlingit "hung out a white flag" on the 22nd, deserting the fort on the 26th.

Following their victory at the Battle of Sitka in October 1804, the Russians established the settlement called New Archangel, named after Arkhangelsk. As a permanent settlement, New Archangel became the largest city in the region. The Tlingit re-established their fort on the Chatham Strait side of Peril Strait to enforce a trade embargo with the Russian establishment. In 1808, with Baranov still governor, Sitka became the informal capital of Russian America.

Bishop Innocent lived in Sitka after 1840. He was known for his interest in education, and his house, the Russian Bishop's House, parts of which served as a schoolhouse, has since been restored by the National Park Service as part of the Sitka National Historical Park.

The original Cathedral of Saint Michael was built in Sitka in 1848 and became the seat of the Russian Orthodox bishop of Kamchatka, the Kurile and Aleutian Islands, and Alaska. The original church burned to the ground in 1966, losing its handmade bells, the large icon of the Last Supper that decorated the top of the royal doors, and the clock in the bell tower. Also lost was the large library containing books in the Russian, Tlingit, and Aleut languages. Although the church was restored to its original appearance, one exception was its clock face, which is black in photographs taken before 1966, but white in subsequent photos.

Swedes, Finns and other nationalities of Lutherans worked for the Russian-American Company, which led to the creation of a Lutheran congregation. The Sitka Lutheran Church building was built in 1840 and was the first Protestant church on the Pacific coast. After the transition to American control, following the purchase of Alaska from Russia by the United States in 1867, the influence of other Protestant religions increased, and Saint-Peter's-by-the-Sea Episcopal Church was consecrated as "the Cathedral of Alaska" in 1900.

=== Territorial Alaska ===
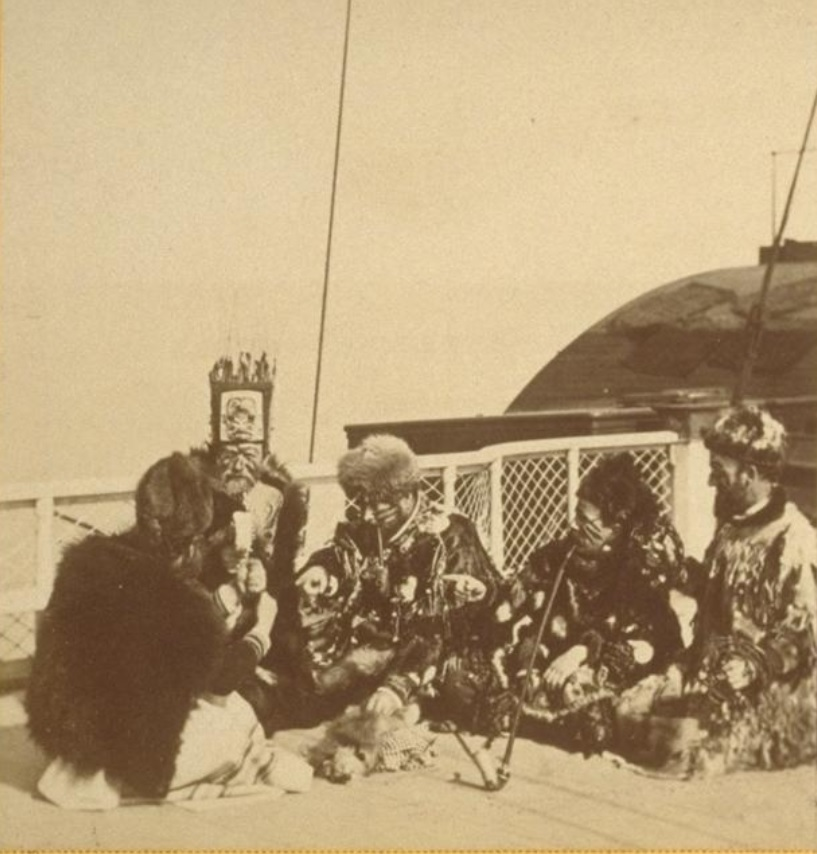
Group of Distinguished Chiefs in Sitka (1868)

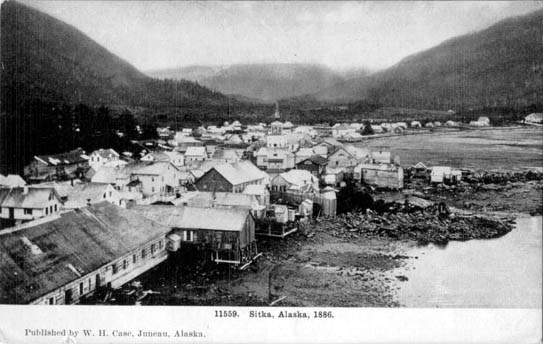
Looking past downtown Sitka, up Indian River valley, in an 1886 postcard. Probably taken from Castle Hill.

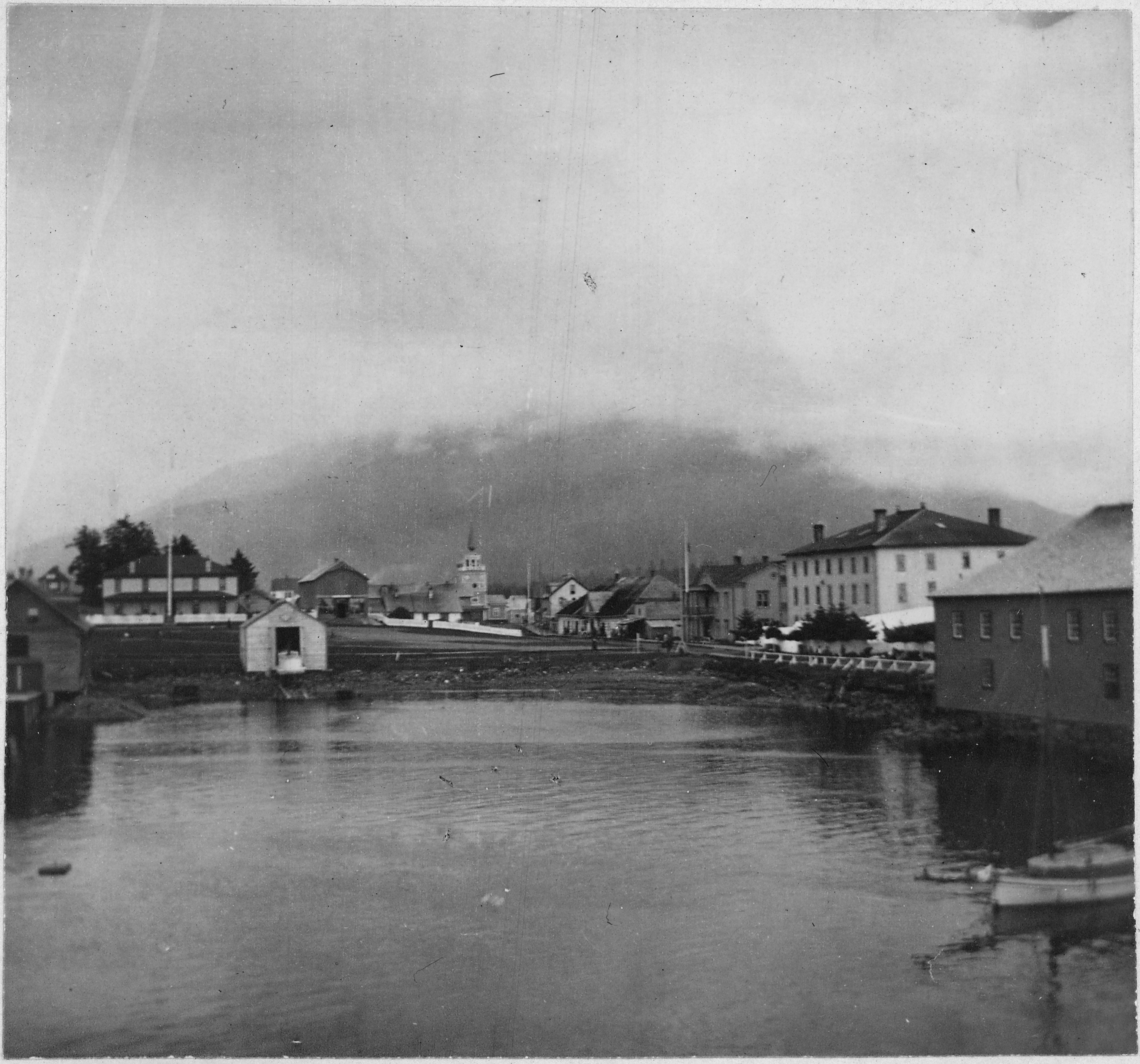
Sitka in 1901

Sitka was the site of the transfer ceremony for the Alaska Purchase on October 18, 1867. Russia was going through economic and political turmoil after it lost the Crimean War to Britain, France, and the Ottoman Empire in 1856, and decided it wanted to sell Alaska before British Canadians tried to conquer the territory. Russia offered to sell it to the United States. Secretary of State William Seward had wanted to purchase Alaska for quite some time, as he saw it as an integral part of Manifest Destiny and America's reach to the Pacific Ocean. While the agreement to purchase Alaska was made in April 1867, the actual purchase and transfer of control took place on October 18, 1867. The cost to purchase Alaska was $7.2 million, at 2 cents per acre.

Sitka served as both the U.S. Government Capital of the Department of Alaska (1867–1884) and District of Alaska (1884–1906). The seat of government was relocated north to Juneau in 1906 due to the declining economic importance of Sitka relative to Juneau, which gained population in the Klondike Gold Rush.

=== Alaska Native Brotherhood, Alaska Native Sisterhood ===
The Alaska Native Brotherhood was founded in Sitka in 1912 to address racism against Alaska Native people in Alaska. By 1914, the organization had constructed the Alaska Native Brotherhood Hall on Katlian Street, which was named after a Tlingit war chief in the early period of Russian colonization.

=== World War II ===
In 1937, the United States Navy established the first seaplane base in Alaska on Japonski Island, across the Sitka Channel from the town. In 1941, construction began on Fort Ray, an army garrison to protect the naval air station. Both the navy and army remained in Sitka until the end of WWII, when the army base was put into caretaker status. The naval station in Sitka was deactivated in June 1944. A shore boat system was then established to transfer the approximately 1,000 passengers a day until the O'Connell Bridge was built in 1972.

=== Economy ===
The Alaska Pulp Corporation was the first Japanese investment in the United States after WWII. In 1959, it began to produce pulp harvested from the Tongass National Forest under a 50-year contract with the US Forest Service. At its peak, the mill employed around 450 people before closing in 1993.

Sitka's Filipino community established itself in Sitka before 1929. It later became institutionalized as the Filipino Community of Sitka in 1981.

Gold mining and fish canning paved the way for the town's initial growth. Today Sitka encompasses portions of Baranof Island and the smaller Japonski Island, which is connected to Baranof Island by the John O'Connell Bridge (which uses the cable-stayed suspension method as its means of support). Japonski Island is home to Sitka Rocky Gutierrez Airport (IATA: SIT; ICAO: PASI), the Sitka branch campus of the University of Alaska Southeast, Mt. Edgecumbe High School (a state-run boarding school for rural Alaskans), Southeast Alaska Regional Health Consortium's Mt. Edgecumbe Hospital, U.S. Coast Guard Air Station Sitka, and the port and facilities for the USCGC Kukui.

Sitka has become a destination for visiting cruise ships. In May 2025, a special referendum on restricting cruise ship tourism took place in the town with 3,000 votes cast. The referendum was less than 10 percent from their all-time high for a special election and some 73% of the voters rejected the limits on cruise ships with only 27% voting in favor of the proposed limits.

== Geography ==
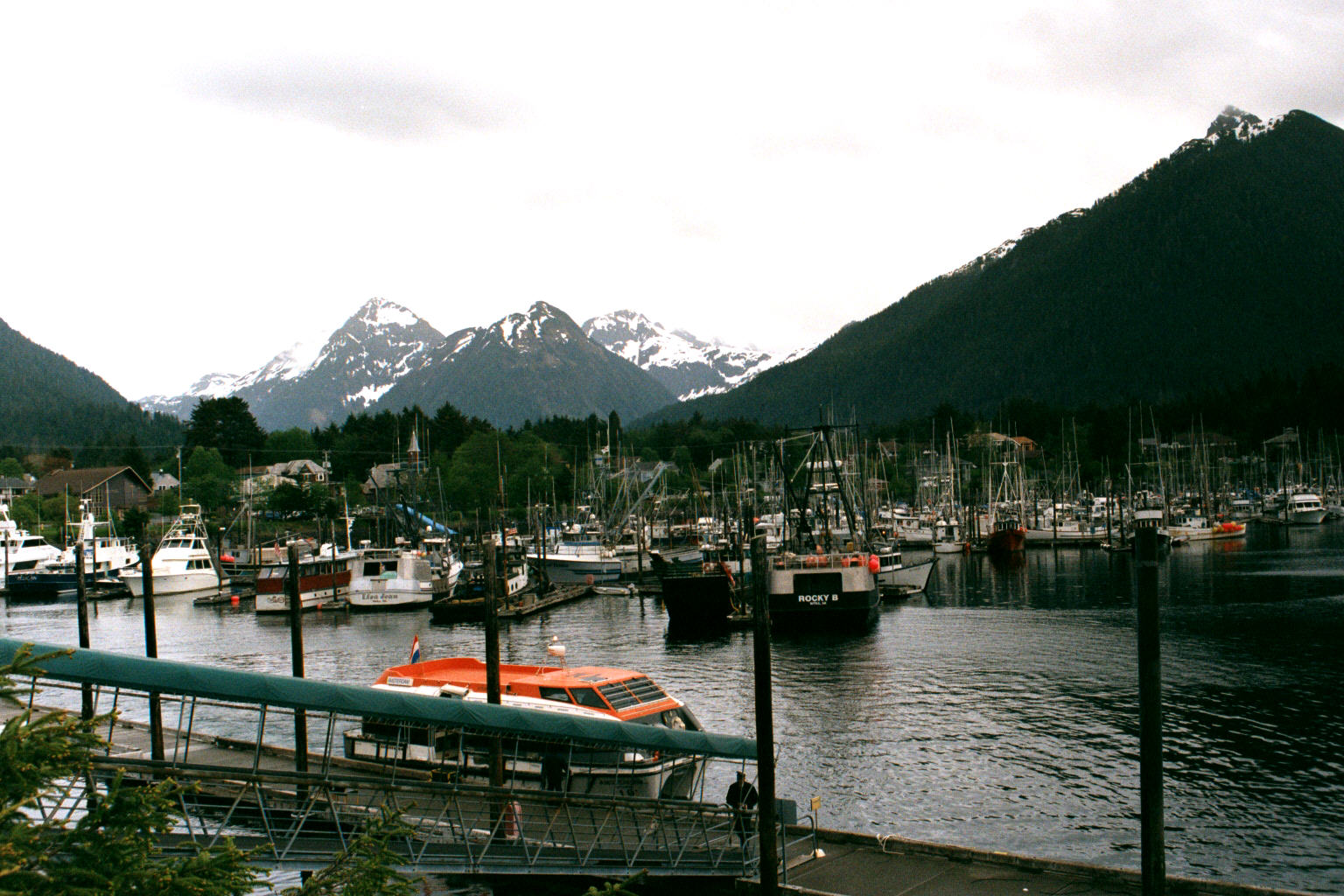
A view of Sitka's Crescent Harbor, Indian River valley and, in the background, The Sisters

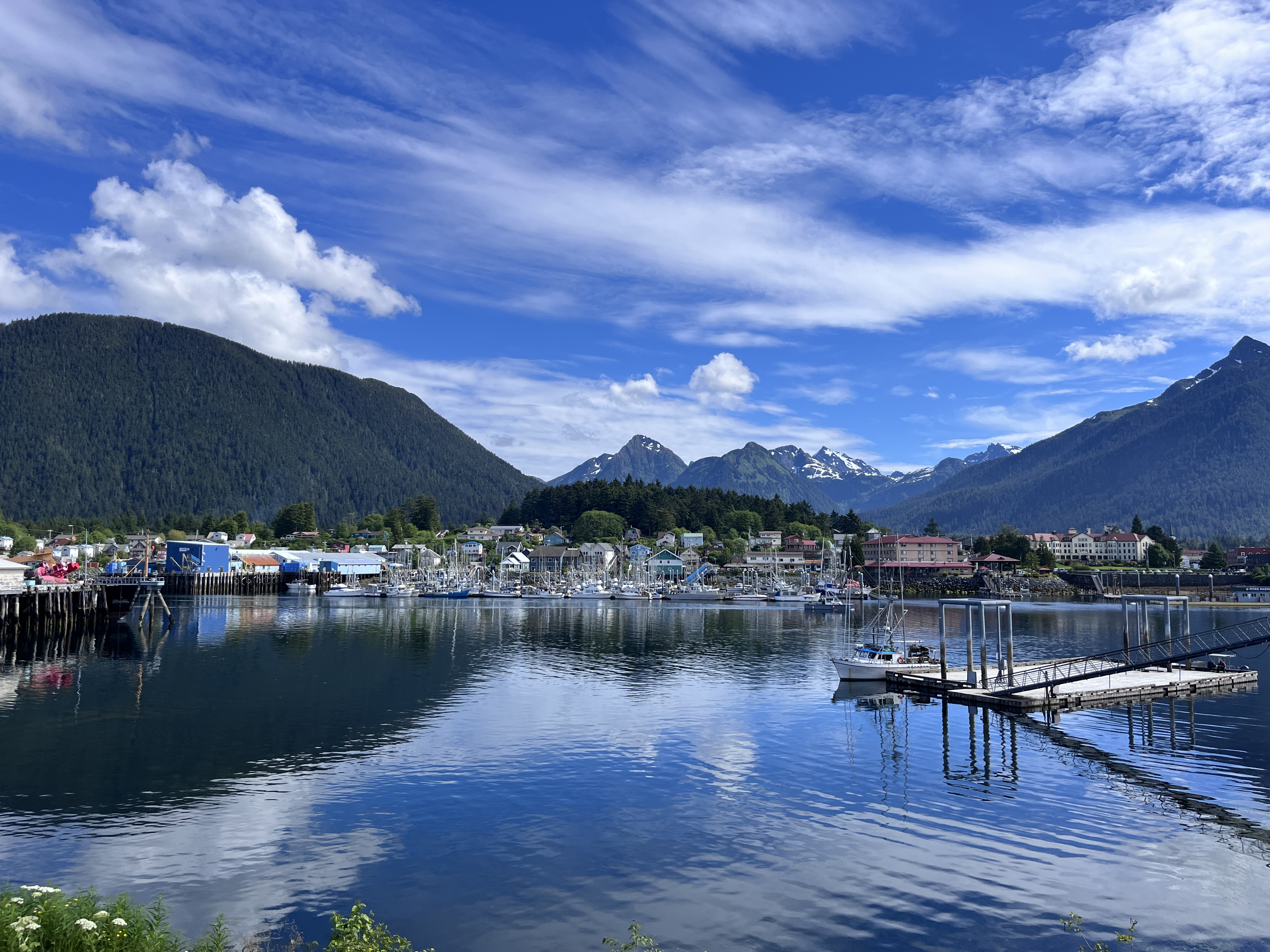
View from across the Sitka Channel in 2024

According to the United States Census Bureau, the borough is the largest incorporated city by area in the U.S., with a total area of 4,811 square miles (12,460.4 km^{2}), of which 2,870 square miles (7,400 km^{2}) is land and 1,941 square miles (5,030 km^{2}), comprising 40.3%, is water. As a comparison, this is almost four times the size of the state of Rhode Island.

Sitka displaced Juneau, Alaska, as the largest incorporated city by area in the United States upon the 2000 incorporation with 2,874 square miles (7,440 km^{2}) of incorporated area. Juneau's incorporated area is 2,717 square miles (7,040 km^{2}).

=== Climate ===
Climate chart for Sitka

Sitka has an oceanic climate (Köppen: Cfb) with moderate, but generally cool, temperatures and abundant precipitation. The average annual precipitation is 131.74 inches (3,350 mm); average seasonal snowfall is 33 inches (84 cm), falling on 233 and 19 days, respectively. The mean annual temperature is 45.3 °F (7.4 °C), with monthly means ranging from 36.4 °F (2.4 °C) in January to 57.2 °F (14.0 °C) in August.

The climate is relatively mild when compared to other parts of the state. Only 5.1 days per year see highs at or above 70 °F (21 °C); conversely, there are only 10 days with the high not above freezing. The winters are extremely mild compared to inland areas of similar and much more southerly parallels, due to the intense maritime moderation. The relatively mild nights ensure that four months stay above the 50 °F (10 °C) isotherm that normally separates inland areas from being boreal in nature. Due to the mild winter nights, hardiness zone is high for the latitude (from 6b to 8a).

The highest temperature ever recorded was 88 °F (31.1 °C) on July 30, 1976, and July 31, 2020. The lowest temperature ever recorded was −1 °F (−18.3 °C) on February 16–17, 1948.

Climate data for Sitka, Alaska (Japonski Island, 1991–2020 normals, extremes 1944–present)
Month	Jan	Feb	Mar	Apr	May	Jun	Jul	Aug	Sep	Oct	Nov	Dec	Year
Record high °F (°C)	60 (16)	61 (16)	67 (19)	76 (24)	82 (28)	83 (28)	88 (31)	84 (29)	77 (25)	70 (21)	65 (18)	65 (18)	88 (31)
Mean maximum °F (°C)	50.9 (10.5)	50.8 (10.4)	52.1 (11.2)	60.1 (15.6)	65.8 (18.8)	69.5 (20.8)	70.8 (21.6)	71.4 (21.9)	67.1 (19.5)	58.5 (14.7)	52.7 (11.5)	50.6 (10.3)	75.6 (24.2)
Mean daily maximum °F (°C)	40.5 (4.7)	41.2 (5.1)	42.5 (5.8)	48.1 (8.9)	53.3 (11.8)	57.6 (14.2)	60.4 (15.8)	61.8 (16.6)	57.9 (14.4)	50.8 (10.4)	44.3 (6.8)	41.5 (5.3)	50.0 (10.0)
Daily mean °F (°C)	36.5 (2.5)	36.7 (2.6)	37.5 (3.1)	42.6 (5.9)	48.1 (8.9)	53.0 (11.7)	56.5 (13.6)	57.3 (14.1)	53.2 (11.8)	46.4 (8.0)	40.0 (4.4)	37.5 (3.1)	45.4 (7.4)
Mean daily minimum °F (°C)	32.4 (0.2)	32.1 (0.1)	32.5 (0.3)	37.2 (2.9)	43.0 (6.1)	48.3 (9.1)	52.5 (11.4)	52.9 (11.6)	48.5 (9.2)	41.9 (5.5)	35.8 (2.1)	33.4 (0.8)	40.9 (4.9)
Mean minimum °F (°C)	18.1 (−7.7)	21.4 (−5.9)	21.8 (−5.7)	29.7 (−1.3)	35.9 (2.2)	42.1 (5.6)	47.5 (8.6)	47.1 (8.4)	40.1 (4.5)	32.0 (0.0)	25.3 (−3.7)	21.1 (−6.1)	13.3 (−10.4)
Record low °F (°C)	0 (−18)	−1 (−18)	4 (−16)	15 (−9)	29 (−2)	35 (2)	41 (5)	34 (1)	31 (−1)	20 (−7)	2 (−17)	1 (−17)	−1 (−18)
Average precipitation inches (mm)	8.22 (209)	5.93 (151)	5.60 (142)	4.31 (109)	3.81 (97)	2.92 (74)	4.62 (117)	7.25 (184)	11.69 (297)	11.78 (299)	9.91 (252)	8.43 (214)	84.47 (2,146)
Average snowfall inches (cm)	9.5 (24)	8.0 (20)	4.9 (12)	0.9 (2.3)	trace	0.0 (0.0)	0.0 (0.0)	0.0 (0.0)	0.0 (0.0)	0.3 (0.76)	4.7 (12)	4.0 (10)	32.3 (82)
Average precipitation days (≥ 0.01 in)	21.2	16.9	18.4	17.5	16.4	16.7	18.9	19.4	22.4	23.7	22.0	21.6	235.1
Average snowy days (≥ 0.1 in)	4.5	3.8	3.4	0.8	0.1	0.0	0.0	0.0	0.0	0.4	3.3	2.7	19.0
Source: NOAA (snow/snow days 1981–2010)

Climate data for Sitka, Alaska (Hidden Falls, 1991–2020 normals, extremes 1992–2020)
Month	Jan	Feb	Mar	Apr	May	Jun	Jul	Aug	Sep	Oct	Nov	Dec	Year
Record high °F (°C)	53 (12)	57 (14)	53 (12)	66 (19)	73 (23)	85 (29)	83 (28)	83 (28)	69 (21)	61 (16)	54 (12)	51 (11)	85 (29)
Mean maximum °F (°C)	44.9 (7.2)	44.9 (7.2)	46.7 (8.2)	53.7 (12.1)	63.4 (17.4)	66.7 (19.3)	69.2 (20.7)	68.8 (20.4)	61.3 (16.3)	53.8 (12.1)	47.4 (8.6)	44.4 (6.9)	72.5 (22.5)
Mean daily maximum °F (°C)	34.7 (1.5)	35.7 (2.1)	38.5 (3.6)	45.7 (7.6)	53.3 (11.8)	57.9 (14.4)	59.9 (15.5)	59.6 (15.3)	54.7 (12.6)	46.8 (8.2)	39.0 (3.9)	35.9 (2.2)	46.8 (8.2)
Daily mean °F (°C)	31.3 (−0.4)	32.0 (0.0)	34.0 (1.1)	39.6 (4.2)	46.8 (8.2)	52.3 (11.3)	55.0 (12.8)	55.0 (12.8)	50.5 (10.3)	43.1 (6.2)	35.6 (2.0)	32.9 (0.5)	42.3 (5.7)
Mean daily minimum °F (°C)	27.8 (−2.3)	28.2 (−2.1)	29.4 (−1.4)	33.5 (0.8)	40.3 (4.6)	46.6 (8.1)	50.2 (10.1)	50.4 (10.2)	46.3 (7.9)	39.4 (4.1)	32.2 (0.1)	29.9 (−1.2)	37.8 (3.2)
Mean minimum °F (°C)	14.5 (−9.7)	17.1 (−8.3)	19.9 (−6.7)	27.5 (−2.5)	34.1 (1.2)	40.5 (4.7)	45.3 (7.4)	45.4 (7.4)	39.1 (3.9)	31.5 (−0.3)	23.0 (−5.0)	17.9 (−7.8)	10.6 (−11.9)
Record low °F (°C)	4 (−16)	6 (−14)	6 (−14)	15 (−9)	28 (−2)	35 (2)	33 (1)	40 (4)	29 (−2)	13 (−11)	11 (−12)	3 (−16)	3 (−16)
Average precipitation inches (mm)	13.57 (345)	9.27 (235)	10.66 (271)	8.11 (206)	4.77 (121)	4.03 (102)	5.06 (129)	6.90 (175)	12.94 (329)	15.96 (405)	18.98 (482)	17.83 (453)	128.08 (3,253)
Average snowfall inches (cm)	29.7 (75)	20.0 (51)	21.1 (54)	0.6 (1.5)	0.0 (0.0)	0.0 (0.0)	0.0 (0.0)	0.0 (0.0)	0.0 (0.0)	0.5 (1.3)	11.5 (29)	22.8 (58)	106.2 (269.8)
Average precipitation days (≥ 0.01 in)	21.1	13.2	20.4	16.9	13.1	15.6	14.9	12.8	20.5	22.0	23.0	23.6	217.1
Average snowy days (≥ 0.1 in)	7.1	4.9	6.1	0.5	0.0	0.0	0.0	0.0	0.0	0.2	3.1	6.6	28.5
Source: NOAA

See or edit raw graph data.

=== Geology ===
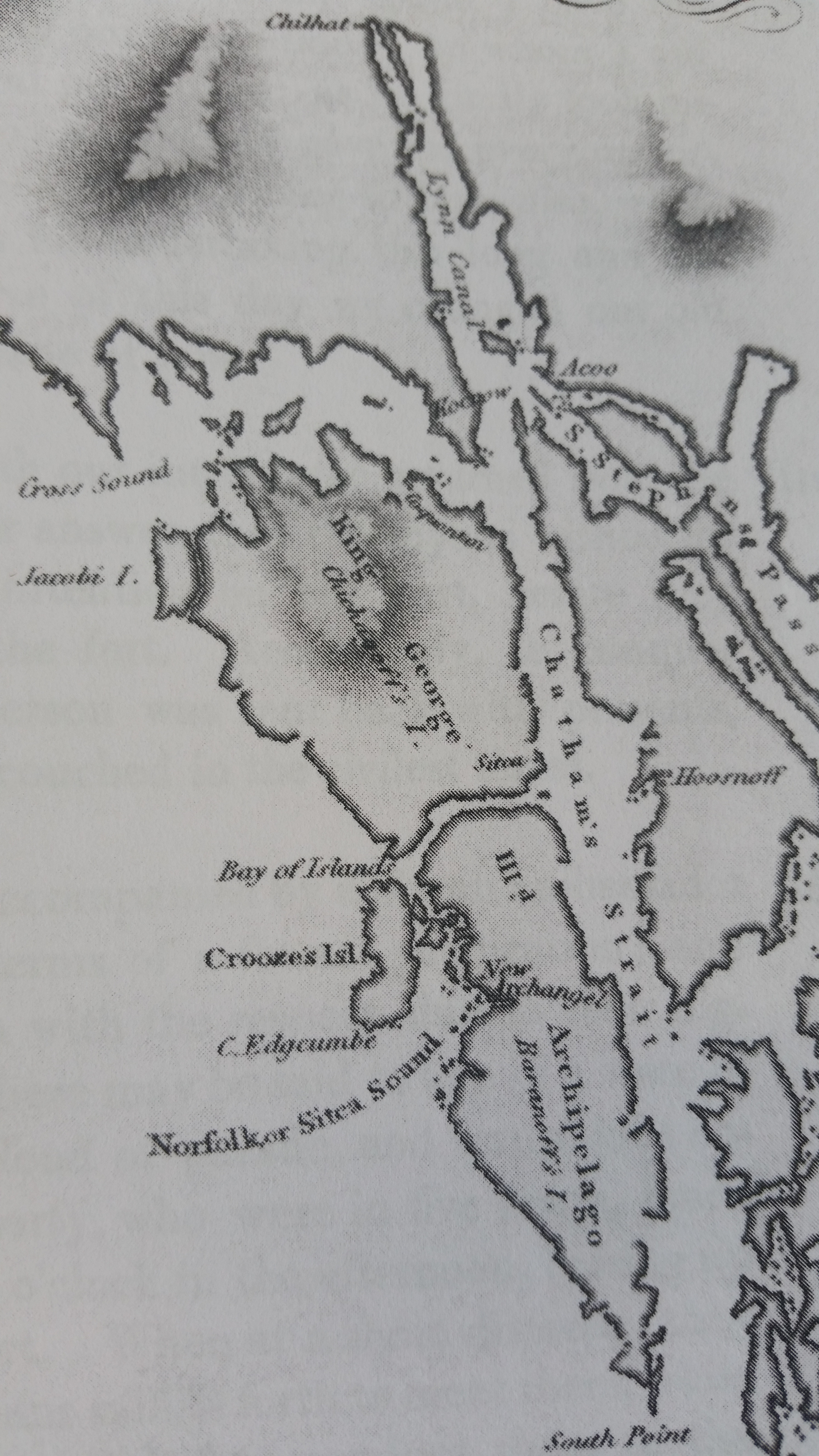
New Archangel and Sitka, 1805

Mount Edgecumbe, a 3,200-foot (980 m) "historically active" stratovolcano, is located on southern Kruzof Island, approximately 24 km (15 mi) west of Sitka and can be seen from the city on a clear day.

On April 22, 2022, the Alaska Volcano Observatory reported that:

[a] swarm of earthquakes was detected in the vicinity of Mount Edgecumbe volcano beginning on Monday, April 11, 2022. There were hundreds of small quakes in the swarm, though the large majority were too small to locate. Over the past few days, earthquake activity has declined and is currently at background levels.

[...]

The recent swarm inspired an in-depth analysis of the last 7.5 years of ground deformation detectable with radar satellite data. Analysis of these data from recent years reveals a broad area, about 17 km (11 mi) in diameter, of surface uplift centered about 2.5 km (1.6 mi) to the east of Mt Edgecumbe. This uplift began in August 2018 and has been continuing to the present at a rate of up to 8.7 cm/yr (3.4 in/yr) in the center of the deforming area. Deformation has been constant since 2018, and there has not been an increase with the recent earthquake activity. The total deformation since 2018 is about 27 cm (11 in). [...] The coincidence of earthquakes and ground deformation in time and location suggests that these signals are likely due to the movement of magma beneath Mount Edgecumbe, as opposed to tectonic activity. Initial modeling of the deformation signal shows that it is consistent with an intrusion of new material (magma) at about 5 km (3.1 mi) below sea level. The earthquakes are likely caused by stresses in the crust due to this intrusion and the substantial uplift that it is causing.

Intrusions of new magma under volcanoes do not always result in volcanic eruptions. The deformation and earthquake activity at Edgecumbe may cease with no eruption occurring. If the magma rises closer to the surface, this would lead to changes in the deformation pattern and an increase in earthquake activity. Therefore, it is very likely that if an eruption were to occur it would be preceded by additional signals that would allow advance warning.

=== Adjacent boroughs and census areas ===
- Hoonah-Angoon Census Area, Alaska – north, northeast
- Prince of Wales–Hyder Census Area, Alaska – southeast

=== National protected areas ===
- Alaska Maritime National Wildlife Refuge (part of Gulf of Alaska unit)
  - Saint Lazaria Wilderness (formerly Saint Lazaria National Wildlife Refuge)
- Sitka National Historical Park
- Tongass National Forest (part)
  - South Baranof Wilderness
  - West Chichagof-Yakobi Wilderness (part)

== Demographics ==
Historical population
Census	Pop.	Note	%±
1880	916		—
1890	1,190		29.9%
1900	1,396		17.3%
1910	1,039		−25.6%
1920	1,175		13.1%
1930	1,056		−10.1%
1940	1,987		88.2%
1950	1,985		−0.1%
1960	3,237		63.1%
1970	3,370		4.1%
1980	7,803		131.5%
1990	8,588		10.1%
2000	8,835		2.9%
2010	8,881		0.5%
2020	8,458		−4.8%
2025 (est.)	8,319	▼	−1.6%
U.S. Decennial Census; 2010-2020

=== 1880 and 1890 censuses ===
Sitka first reported on the 1880 census as an unincorporated village. Of 916 residents, there were 540 Tlingit, 219 Creole (Mixed Russian and Native) and 157 Whites reported. It was the largest community in Alaska at that census. In 1890, it fell to second place behind Juneau. It reported 1,190 residents, of whom 861 were Native, 280 were White, 31 were Asian, 17 were Creole and 1 was Other. In 1900, it fell to 4th place behind Nome, Skagway and Juneau. It did not report a racial breakdown.

=== 1910 and 1920 censuses ===
In 1910, Sitka was reported as two separate communities based on race: the village with mostly non-natives (population 539) and the part of the village with natives (population 500). Separately, they placed as the 15th and 17th largest communities. United, they would be 8th largest. For the purposes of comparison and the fact that the village was not officially politically/racially divided except by the census bureau report, the combined total (1,039) is reported on the historic population list. In 1913, Sitka was incorporated as a city, rendering the division by the census bureau for 1910 moot. In 1920, Sitka became the 4th largest city in the territory. In 1930, it fell to 7th place with 1,056 residents. Of those, 567 reported as Native, 480 as White and 9 as Other. In 1940, it rose to 5th place, but did not report a racial breakdown.

=== 1950 and 1960 censuses ===
In 1950, it reported as the 9th largest community in Alaska (6th largest incorporated city). It did not report a racial breakdown. At statehood in 1960, it became the 6th largest community (5th largest incorporated city). With the annexations increasing its population to 3,237, it reported a White majority for its first time: 2,160 Whites, 1,054 Others (including Natives) and 23 Blacks. In 1970, it fell to 14th place overall (though 7th largest incorporated city) with 3,370 residents. Of those, 2,503 were White, 676 Native Americans, 95 Others, 74 Asians and 22 Blacks. In 1980, Sitka rose to 4th largest city with 7,803 residents (of whom 5,718 were non-Hispanic White, 1,669 were Native American, 228 were Asian, 108 were Hispanic (of any race), 87 were Other, 44 were Black and 7 were Pacific Islander).

=== 1990 and 2000 censuses ===
In 1990, Sitka fell to 5th largest (4th largest incorporated) with 8,588 residents. 6,270 were non-Hispanic White; 1,797 were Native American; 315 were Asian; 209 were Hispanic (of any race); 60 were Other; 39 were Black and 18 Pacific Islanders. In 2000, Sitka retained its 5th largest (and 4th largest incorporated) position. In 2010, it slipped to the 7th largest community overall (but still remained the 4th largest incorporated city).

=== 2010 census ===
As of the census of 2010, there were 8,881 people living in the borough. The racial makeup of the borough, based on one race alone or in combination with one or more other races, was, 64.6% White (including White Hispanic and Latino Americans), 1% Black or African American, 24.6% Native American, 8.1% Asian, 0.9% Pacific Islander, 1.8% from other races. In addition, 4.9% of the population were Hispanic and Latino Americans of any race.

There were 3,545 households, out of which 29.5% had children under the age of 18 living with them, 45.5% were married couples living together, 10.7% had a female householder with no husband present, 6.1% had a male householder with no wife present, and 37.6% were non-families. The average household size was 2.43 and the average family size was 3.01.

=== 2020 census ===
As of the 2020 census, the county had a population of 8,458. The median age was 40.1 years. 20.6% of residents were under the age of 18 and 16.9% of residents were 65 years of age or older. For every 100 females there were 104.0 males, and for every 100 females age 18 and over there were 103.3 males age 18 and over.

The racial makeup of the county was 61.2% White, 0.4% Black or African American, 14.8% American Indian and Alaska Native, 6.8% Asian, 0.2% Native Hawaiian and Pacific Islander, 2.5% from some other race, and 14.2% from two or more races. Hispanic or Latino residents of any race comprised 5.9% of the population.

90.7% of residents lived in urban areas, while 9.3% lived in rural areas.

There were 3,421 households in the county, of which 31.2% had children under the age of 18 living with them and 24.3% had a female householder with no spouse or partner present. About 30.8% of all households were made up of individuals and 10.5% had someone living alone who was 65 years of age or older.

There were 4,139 housing units, of which 17.3% were vacant. Among occupied housing units, 60.3% were owner-occupied and 39.7% were renter-occupied. The homeowner vacancy rate was 1.8% and the rental vacancy rate was 10.2%.

=== Racial and ethnic composition ===
Sitka city and borough, Alaska – Racial composition Note: the US Census treats Hispanic/Latino as an ethnic category. This table excludes Latinos from the racial categories and assigns them to a separate category. Hispanics/Latinos may be of any race.
Race (NH = Non-Hispanic)	% 2020	% 2010	% 2000	Pop 2020	Pop 2010	Pop 2000
White alone (NH)	59.7%	63.5%	67.1%	5,050	5,641	5,927
Black alone (NH)	0.4%	0.5%	0.3%	37	43	24
American Indian alone (NH)	14.3%	16.2%	18.1%	1,206	1,442	1,597
Asian alone (NH)	6.8%	5.7%	3.7%	573	509	329
Pacific Islander alone (NH)	0.2%	0.3%	0.4%	14	29	31
Other race alone (NH)	0.6%	0.1%	0.2%	53	11	17
Multiracial (NH)	12.1%	8.7%	7%	1,024	769	620
Hispanic/Latino (any race)	5.9%	4.9%	3.3%	501	437	290

The most reported detailed ancestries in 2020 were:

- German (16.8%)
- Irish (15.3%)
- English (14.6%)
- Tlingit (7.7%)
- Filipino (7.3%)
- Sitka Tribe of Alaska (6%)
- Scottish (5.3%)
- Norwegian (4.6%)
- Italian (3.5%)
- Mexican (3.3%)

== Economy ==
In 2010, Sitka's two largest employers were the Southeast Alaska Regional Health Consortium (SEARHC), employing 482 people, and the Sitka School District, which employs 250 people. However, there are more people employed in the seafood industry than in any other sector. An estimated 18% of Sitka's population earns at least a portion of their income from fishing and seafood harvesting and processing. Many Sitkans hunt and gather subsistence foods such as fish, deer, berries, seaweeds and mushrooms for personal use.

Within the total 2010 population of 8,881 residents, an estimated 7,161 were over 16 years of age. Of residents aged 16 and over, an estimated 4,692 were employed within the civilian labor force, 348 were unemployed (looking for work), 192 were employed in the armed forces (U.S. Coast Guard), and 1,929 were not in the labor force. The average unemployment rate between 2006 and 2010 was 6.9%. The median household income in 2010 inflation adjusted dollars was $62,024. An estimated 4.3% of all families / 7% of all residents had incomes below the poverty level "in the past twelve months"(2010).

Sitka's electrical power is generated by dams at Blue Lake and Green Lake, with supplemental power provided by burning diesel when electric demand exceeds hydro capacity. In December 2012 the Blue Lake Expansion project began, which added 27 percent more electricity for the residents of Sitka. The project was completed in November 2014.

=== Port ===
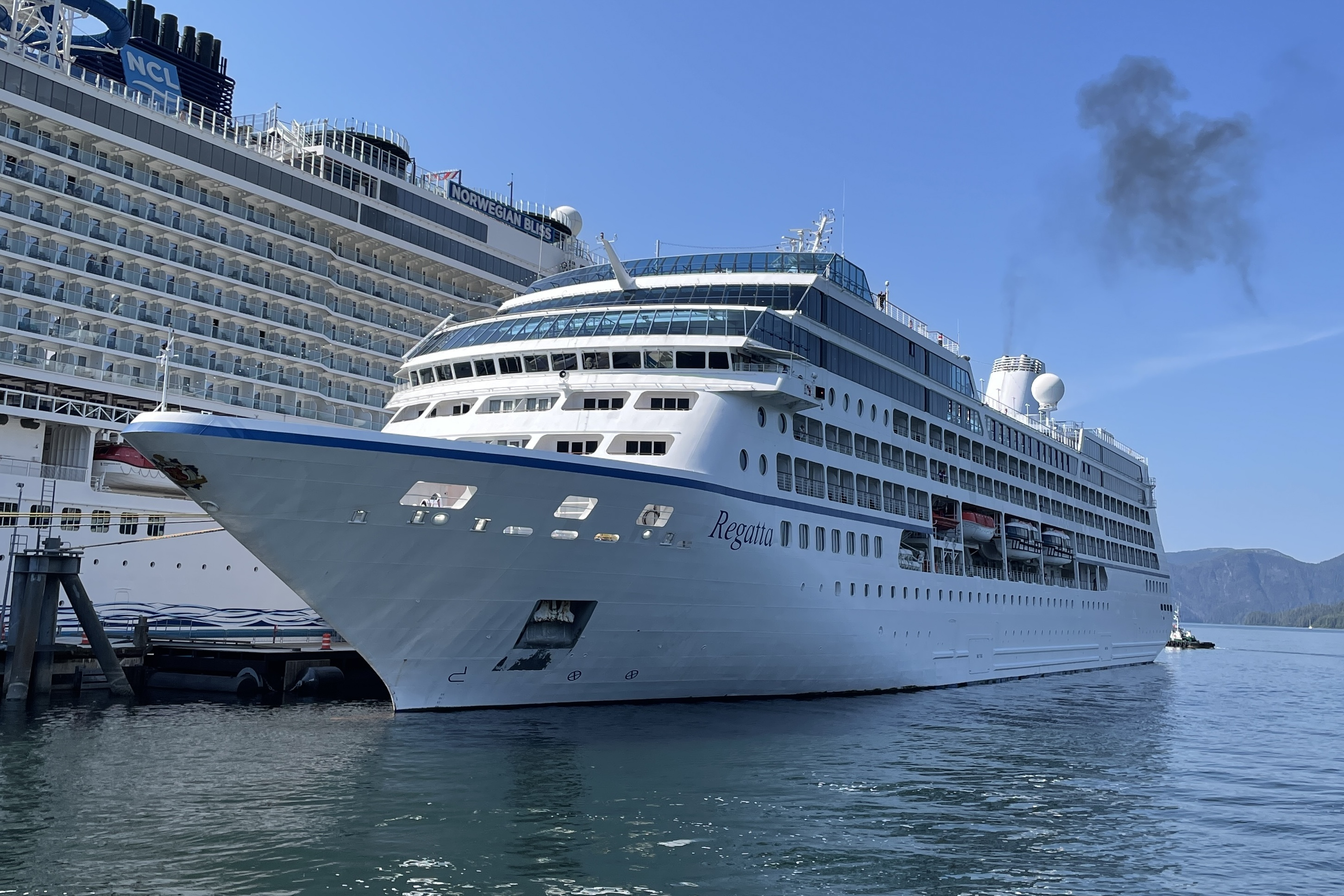
Cruise ships moored in Sitka

Sitka is the 6th largest port by value of seafood harvest in the United States. International trade is relatively minor, with total exports and imports valued at $474,000 and $146,000, respectively, in 2005 by the American Association of Port Authorities. The port has the largest harbor system in Alaska with 1,347 permanent slips.

During Russian rule, Sitka was a busy seaport on the west coast of North America, mentioned a number of times by Dana in his popular account of an 1834 sailing voyage Two Years Before the Mast. After the transfer of Alaska to U.S. rule, the Pacific Coast Steamship Company began tourist cruises to Sitka in 1884. By 1890, Sitka was receiving 5,000 tourist passengers a year.

Old Sitka Dock, located at Halibut Point, one mile south of the Old Sitka State Historical Park, commemorating the 1800s Russian settlement, and six miles north of downtown Sitka, is a private deep water port offering moorage facilities. A 470-foot-long floating dock for vessels up to 1100 feet was constructed there by its owners in 2012 and was first used in 2013. In Spring 2016, Holland America Line agreed to dock its ships at the Old Sitka Dock. Since then, the majority of the cruise ships calling on Sitka berth at the Old Sitka Dock, with the remainder anchoring offshore in Crescent Harbor and tendering their passengers to downtown Sitka. In the 2017 season, there were 136 cruise ship calls at Sitka with more than 150,000 passengers in total; of these fewer than 30,000 were tendered. The number of cruise ships visitors to Sitka more than doubled over two seasons in the years 2022 and 2023. At its peak, the city can receive some 13,000 visitors a day, exceeding the number of residents.

The United States Coast Guard plans to homeport one of its Sentinel-class cutters in Sitka.

== Arts and culture ==
There are 22 buildings and sites in Sitka that appear in the National Register of Historic Places.

On October 18, Alaska celebrates Alaska Day to commemorate the Alaska purchase. The City of Sitka holds an annual Alaska Day Festival. This week-long event includes a reenactment ceremony of the signing of the Alaska purchase, as well as interpretive programs at museums and parks, special exhibits, aircraft displays and film showings, receptions, historic sites and buildings tours, food, prose writing contest essays, Native and other dancing, and entertainment and more. The first recorded Alaska Day Festival was held in 1949.

== Government ==
United States presidential election results for Sitka, Alaska
Year	Republican		Democratic		Third party(ies)	
Year	No.	%	No.	%	No.	%
1960	982	46.28%	1,140	53.72%	0	0.00%
1964	629	28.59%	1,571	71.41%	0	0.00%
1968	1,023	44.29%	1,148	49.70%	139	6.02%
1972	1,280	52.61%	1,080	44.39%	73	3.00%
1976	1,559	58.41%	1,004	37.62%	106	3.97%
1980	1,862	53.00%	1,212	34.50%	439	12.50%
1984	2,380	61.09%	1,403	36.01%	113	2.90%
1988	2,232	54.89%	1,720	42.30%	114	2.80%
1992	1,741	37.79%	1,695	36.79%	1,171	25.42%
1996	1,823	42.10%	1,732	40.00%	775	17.90%
2000	2,067	48.20%	1,484	34.61%	737	17.19%
2004	1,726	47.59%	1,737	47.89%	164	4.52%
2008	2,129	46.00%	2,355	50.89%	144	3.11%
2012	1,832	41.49%	2,340	53.00%	243	5.50%
2016	1,830	40.89%	2,135	47.71%	510	11.40%
2020	1,745	43.29%	2,124	52.69%	162	4.02%
2024	1,659	42.92%	2,057	53.22%	149	3.86%

The City and Borough of Sitka is a Unified Home Rule city. The home rule charter of the City and Borough of Sitka was adopted on December 2, 1971, for the region of the Greater Sitka Borough, which included Japonski Island and Port Alexander and Baranof Warm Springs on Baranof Island. The city was incorporated on September 24, 1963. On October 23, 1973, the city of Port Alexander was detached from the borough.

== Education ==
=== Colleges and universities ===
Sitka hosts one active post-secondary institution, the University of Alaska Southeast-Sitka Campus, located on Japonski Island in an old World War II hangar. Sheldon Jackson College, a small Presbyterian-affiliated private college, suspended operations in June 2007, after several years of financial stress. Outer Coast College, a private liberal arts college established in 2015, is currently in development as an undergraduate institution founded on the former campus of Sheldon Jackson College.

=== Schools ===
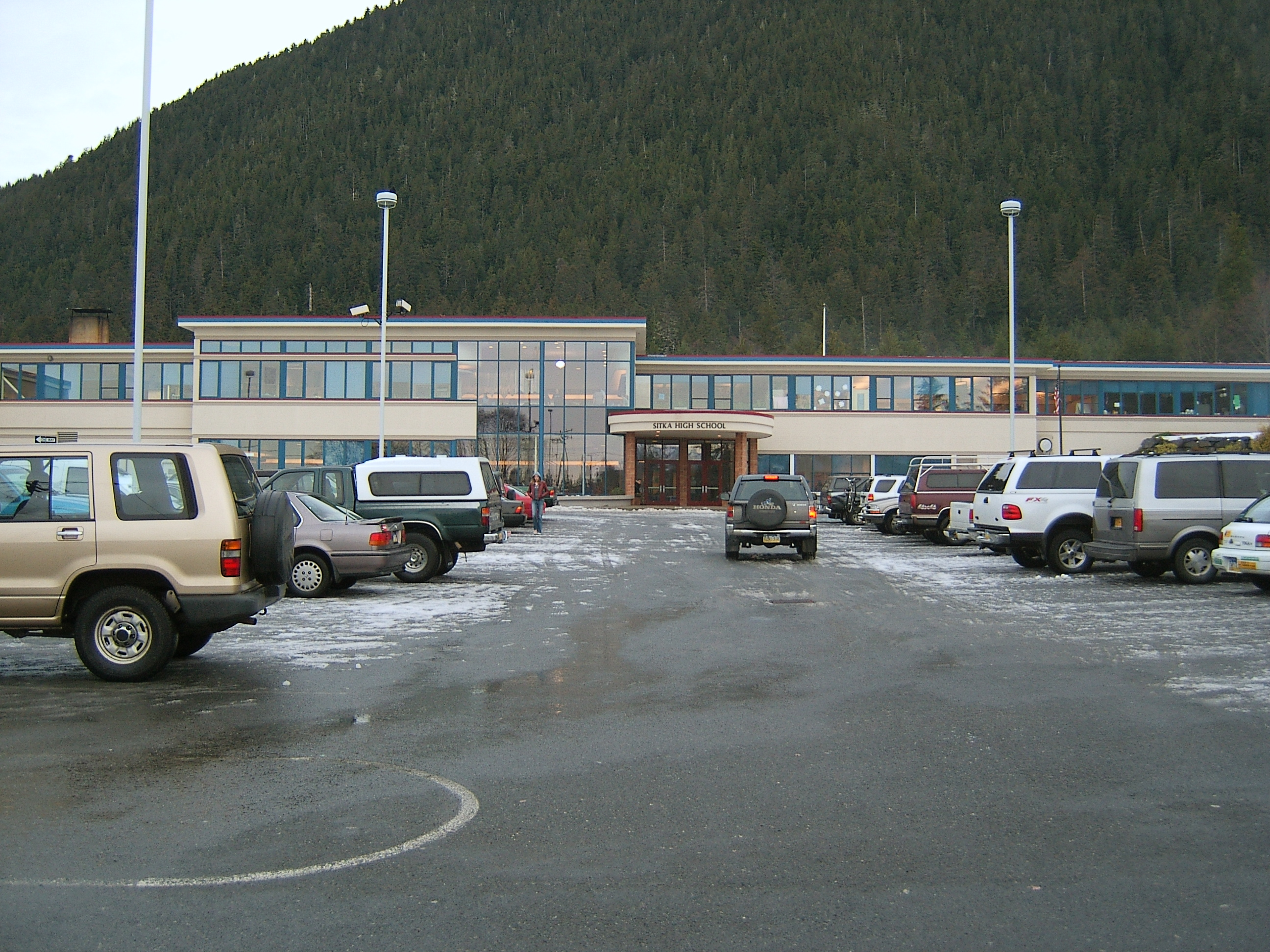
Sitka High School

The Sitka School District, the designated public school district, runs several schools in Sitka, including Sitka High School and Pacific High School, as well as the town's only middle school, Blatchley Middle School. It also runs a home school assistance program through Terry's Learning Center.

Mt. Edgecumbe High School, a State of Alaska-run boarding high school for rural, primarily Native students, is located on Japonski Island adjacent to the University of Alaska Southeast.

One private school is available in Sitka: Sitka Adventist School.

=== Alaska State Trooper Academy ===
The Alaska State Trooper Academy – the academy for all Alaska State Troopers – is located in Sitka.

=== Libraries ===
Sitka Public Library, formerly Kettleson Memorial Library, is the public library for Sitka. It receives about 100,000 guests annually and houses a collection of 75,000 books, audiobooks, music recordings, reference resources, videos (DVD and VHS), as well as an assortment of Alaskan and national periodicals. Its annual circulation is 133,000. The library is well known by visitors for its view. The large windows in front of the reading area look south across Eastern Channel towards the Pyramids.

Until its closing, Sitka was also home to Stratton Library, the academic library of Sheldon Jackson College.

== Media ==
=== Print ===
Sitka is served by the Daily Sitka Sentinel, one of the few remaining independently owned daily newspapers in the state. Sitka also receives circulation of the Capital City Weekly, a weekly regional newspaper based out of Juneau.

Alaska's first newspaper following the Alaska purchase, the Sitka Times, was published by Barney O. Ragan on September 19, 1868. Only four issues were published that year, as Ragan cited a lack of resources available at the time. The paper resumed publishing the following year as the Alaska Times. In 1870, it moved to Seattle, where the year following it was renamed the Seattle Times (not to be confused with the modern-day newspaper of the same name).

=== Radio ===
Sitka has three radio stations, a public radio station KCAW (Raven Radio), and commercial radio stations KIFW, and KSBZ. Sitka previously had a Presbyterian Church owned KSEW.

=== Television ===
KTNL-TV (MeTV) broadcasts out of Sitka on Channel 13 (Cable 6) serving Southeast Alaska. Additionally, KSCT-LP (NBC) Channel 5, KTOO (PBS) Channel 10, and KJUD (ABC/CW) serve the region. There was a previous NBC affiliate in the Region, KSA-TV, available to cable systems, which is now defunct.

== Infrastructure ==
=== Transportation ===
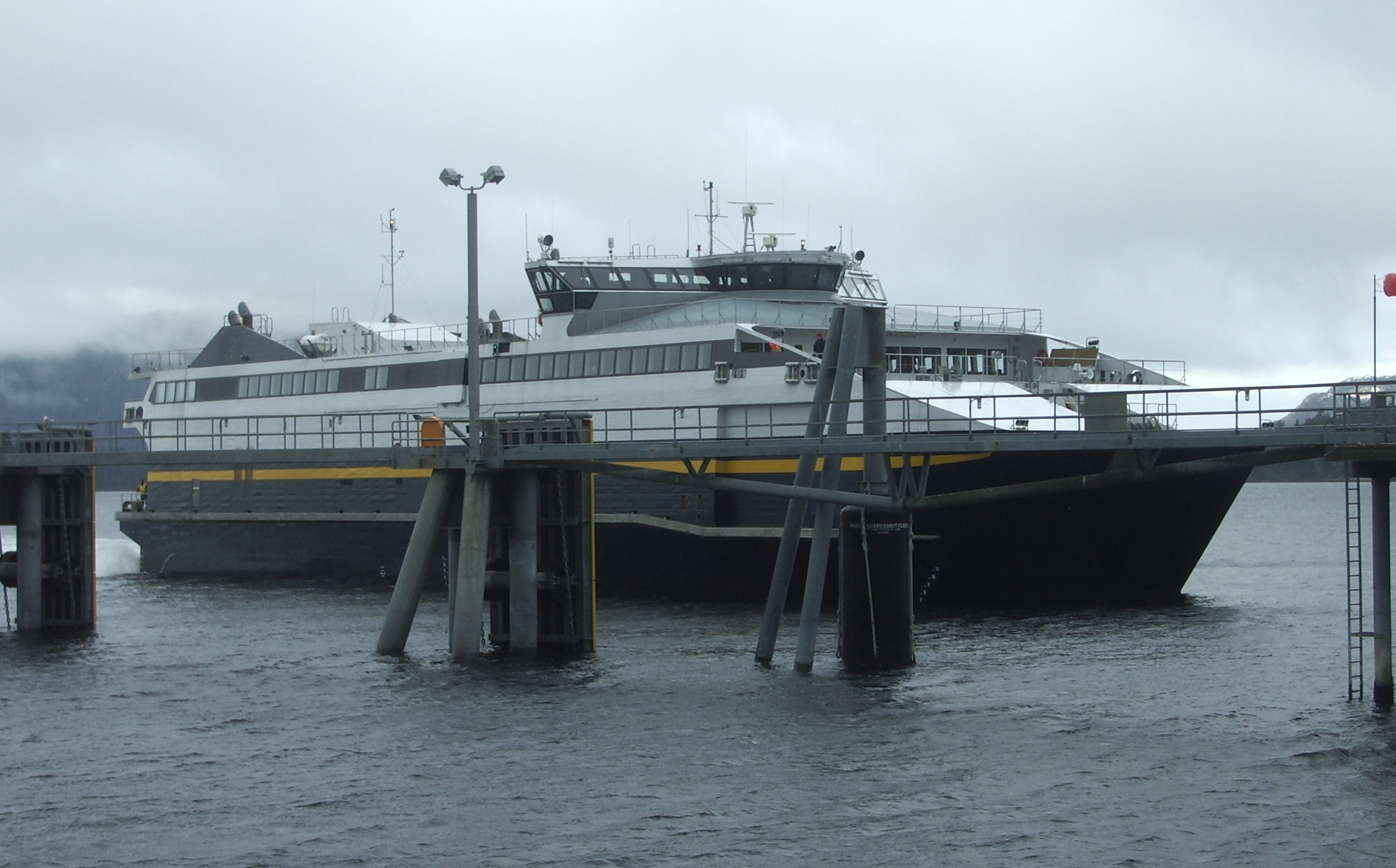
The Alaska Marine Highway system fast ferry 'Chenega' at Sitka

Sitka is only accessible by boat or plane as it is on a pair of islands in the Pacific Ocean. Vehicles are usually brought to Sitka via the Alaska Marine Highway ferry system or the barge. However, a vehicle is not an absolute necessity in Sitka, as there are only 14 miles (23 kilometers) of road from one end of the island to another. Almost everything is within walking distance of the downtown area, which is where the majority of employers are situated. Public transportation is also available.

By air, Sitka Rocky Gutierrez Airport offers scheduled passenger jet service operated year-round by Alaska Airlines.

Delays in fall and winter due to Sitka's weather are frequent. The airport is located on Japonski Island, which is connected to Baranof Island by the O'Connell Bridge. The O'Connell Bridge, completed in 1972, was the first vehicular cable-stayed bridge in the United States. The Sitka Seaplane Base is a seaplane landing area situated in the Sitka Channel, adjacent to the airport.

Ferry travel back and forth to Juneau, Ketchikan and other towns in Southeast Alaska is provided through the Alaska Marine Highway System. The ferry terminal is located 7 miles (11 km) north of downtown and a ferry ticket costs about $89 per person each way to Juneau (as of February 2023). Vehicles, pets and bicycles can also be taken on the ferry for an additional charge.

Sitka's location on the outer coast of the Alaska Panhandle is removed from routes running through Chatham Strait. The tides of Peril Strait allow mainline vessels through only at slack tide.

Alaska Marine Lines, a barge and freight company, has the ability to move cars to other communities connected to the mainland by road systems.

A three-way partnership of non-profits (Center for Community, Sitka Tribe of Alaska, and Southeast Senior Services) offers public bus transit, funded by the Federal Transit Administration and the Alaska Department of Transportation. All buses are fully accessible, with service from 6:30 a.m. to 7:30 p.m., Monday through Friday.

In 2008, the League of American Bicyclists awarded Sitka the bronze level in bicycle friendliness, making Sitka the first bicycle-friendly community in Alaska. In 2013, the Walk Friendly Communities program awarded Sitka with a bronze award, making Sitka the first Alaska community with a Walk Friendly Communities designation. Sitka is the only Alaska community to have both a Bicycle Friendly Community and a Walk Friendly Communities designation.

=== Healthcare ===
There is currently one hospital serving Sitka, Edgecumbe Hospital, which sits on Japonski Island across Sitka Harbor from the city. The facility is part of the Southeast Alaska Regional Health Consortium, or SEARHC, a non-profit tribal health consortium of 18 Native communities. The hospital serves as a regional referral center for people throughout Southeast Alaska, and also provides primary outpatient care. Numerous specialty clinics are offered at the hospital that are not available in the smaller communities such as neurology, orthopedic, dermatology, ophthalmology and denture clinics.

The former Sitka Community Hospital was purchased by the Southeast Alaska Regional Health Consortium (SEARHC) in April 2019, and now functions as a long-term care facility for patients of Edgecumbe hospital.

== Notable people ==
- Augusta Cohen Coontz (1867–1940), American First Lady of Guam
- Dale DeArmond (1914–2006), printmaker, book illustrator
- Annie Furuhjelm (1859–1937), Finnish journalist, legislator
- Sheldon Jackson (1834–1909), Presbyterian missionary in Alaska in the late 19th century
- Rebecca Himschoot, State representative
- Richard Nelson (1941–2019), cultural anthropologist, writer, activist
- Teri Rofkar (1956–2016), Tlingit weaver
- John Straley, author
- Mary Bong (1880-1958), as Sing Deuh, Ah Fuh/Fur, or Qui Fah. One of the first Chinese immigrants to live in Sitka; also known as "China Mary".
- David Voluck, chief judge of the Sitka Tribal Court, only non-Native tribal judge in Alaska
- Jonathan Kreiss-Tomkins, 13th governor of Alaska (elect)

== Twin towns – sister cities ==
Sitka has the following sister city:

- Nemuro, Hokkaido, Japan

== Attractions ==
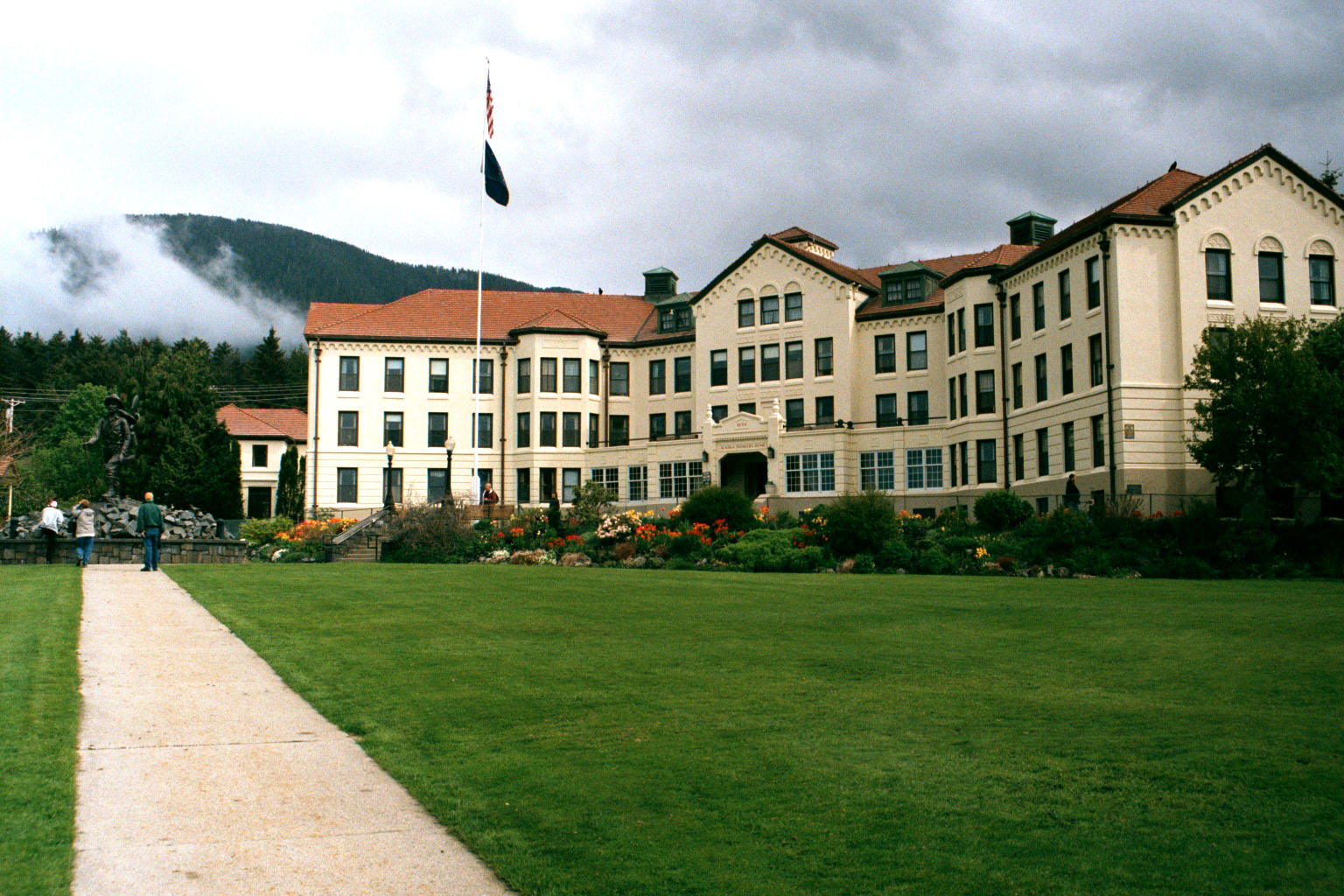
The Pioneer Home, one of Sitka's many historic structures, in May 2002

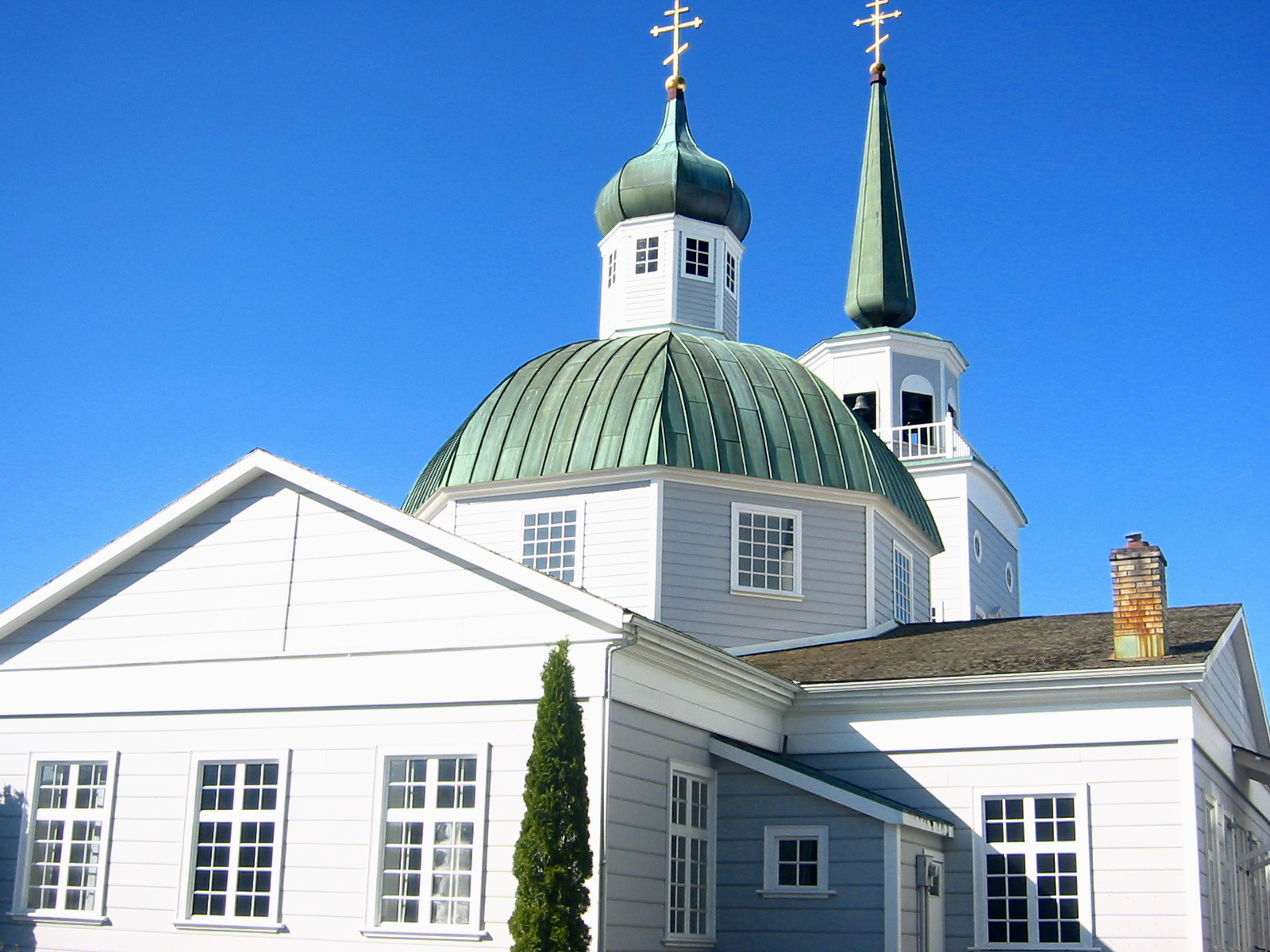
Saint Michael's Russian Orthodox Cathedral in Sitka

Sitka's attractions include:

- Alaska Raptor Center
- Baranof Castle Hill
- Fortress of the Bear
- Sheet'ká Kwáan Naa Kahídi
- Russian Bishop's House
- Saint Lazaria National Wildlife Refuge
- St. Michael's Cathedral
- Sheldon Jackson Museum
- Sitka Fine Arts Camp
- Sitka Historical Museum
- Sitka Jazz Festival
- Sitka Lutheran Church
- Sitka National Historical Park
- Sitka Pioneer Home
- Sitka Summer Music Festival
- Swan Lake
- Tongass National Forest

The flora and fauna of Sitka and its surrounding area are popular. Day cruises and guided day trips (hiking) are large enterprises in Sitka. Floatplane "flightseeing" excursions are a way to view the area's sights from above.

=== Outdoor opportunities ===
Sitka's position between the Pacific Ocean and the most mountainous island in the Alexander Archipelago creates a variety of outdoor opportunities:

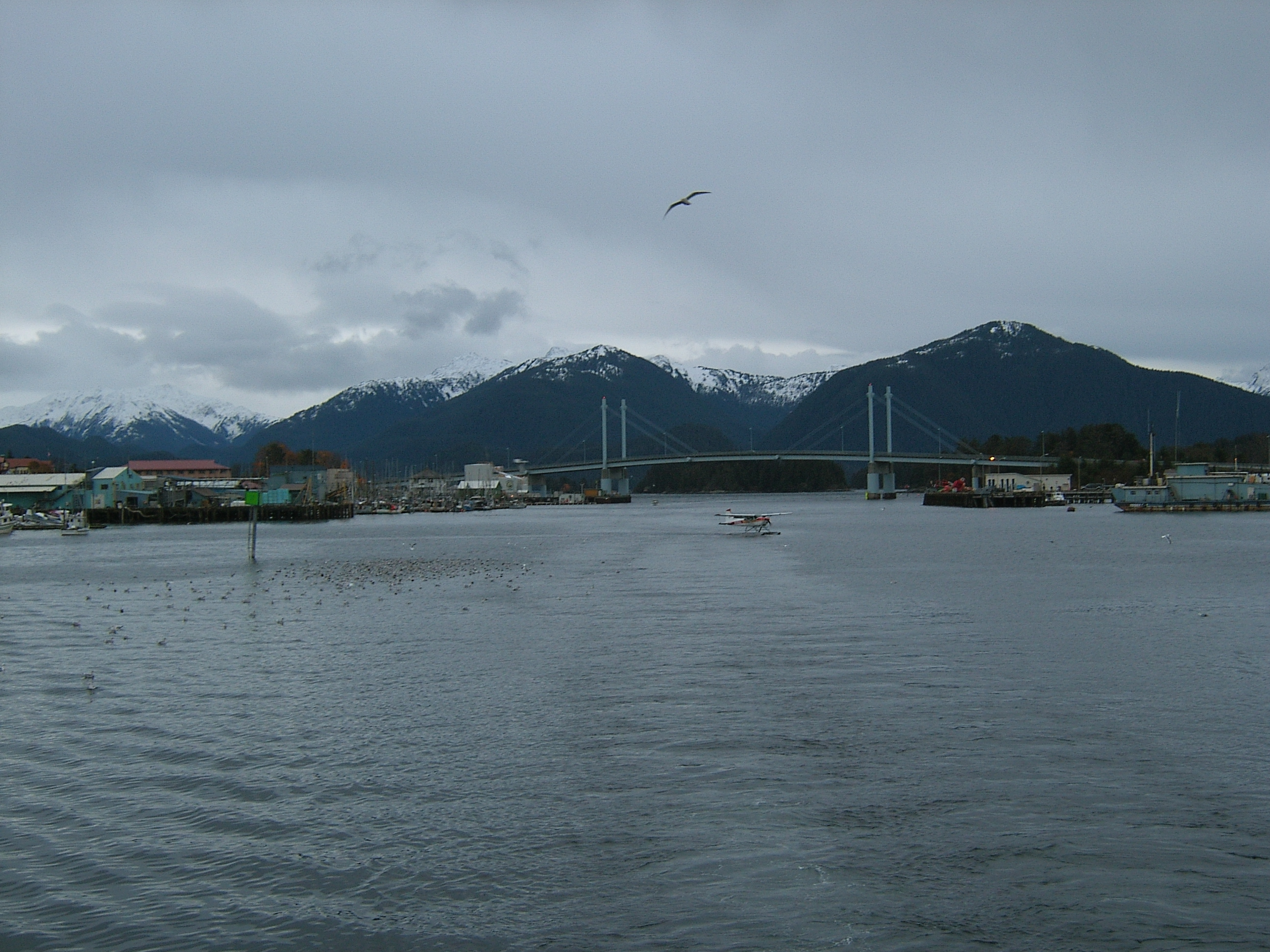
Looking down Sitka Channel in the early morning

- Kayaking is a popular activity and small guided day excursions are offered locally.
- There are a number of maintained trails in the Sitka area, many of which are accessible from Sitka's road system.
- The dormant volcano Mount Edgecumbe is also a popular mountain to summit and features a seven-mile (11 km) trail up to the top. Guided day-trips are available, but the trip does not require much knowledge to undertake.

== In popular culture ==
- Louis L'Amour penned Sitka, his fictional account of the events surrounding the United States' purchase of the Alaska Territory from the Russians for $7.2 million in 1867.
- Novelist James Michener lived at Sitka's Sheldon Jackson College while doing research for his epic work, Alaska.
- The 1952 film The World in His Arms has Russian Sitka as one of its settings.
- Sitka is the opening setting in Ivan Doig's 1982 historical fiction, The Sea Runners.
- Sitka is mentioned in Chapter 53 of James Clavell's 1993 historical fiction about Japan, Gai-Jin.
- Mystery author John Straley described Sitka as "...an island town where people feel crowded by the land and spread out on the sea."
- Part of the action in the novel César Cascabel by Jules Verne takes place in Sitka in May–June 1867, during the transfer of ownership to the United States.
- A fictionalized Sitka, inhabited by several million Jews who fled from Nazi-occupied Europe and their descendants, is the setting of the alternate history detective novel The Yiddish Policemen's Union, by Michael Chabon.
- Sitka is featured in the episode "Z-9000" of the Argentine TV series Los simuladores as the place where its antagonist, Lorenzo, is sent to keep him away from his wife whom he used to assault, under the pretext that a clone of him is trying to kill him.
- Sitka is a setting in the 2009 film The Proposal starring Sandra Bullock and Ryan Reynolds, although the scenes were filmed in Rockport, Massachusetts.
- Sitka is the name of one of the characters in the Disney film Brother Bear (2004).
- Sitka was featured in a 2012 episode of the Travel Channel's popular series Bizarre Foods, starring Andrew Zimmern. In this episode, Zimmern ate herring eggs, stink heads and sea cucumbers.
- Sitka was named one of the Top 20 Small Towns to Visit in 2013 by Smithsonian magazine.

== See also ==
- List of United States cities by area
- Maritime fur trade
- USS Sitka
