= China Mary =

Name given to early female Chinese immigrants to the United States

China Mary was a pseudo name given to multiple Chinese women who immigrated to the United States in the 19th century.

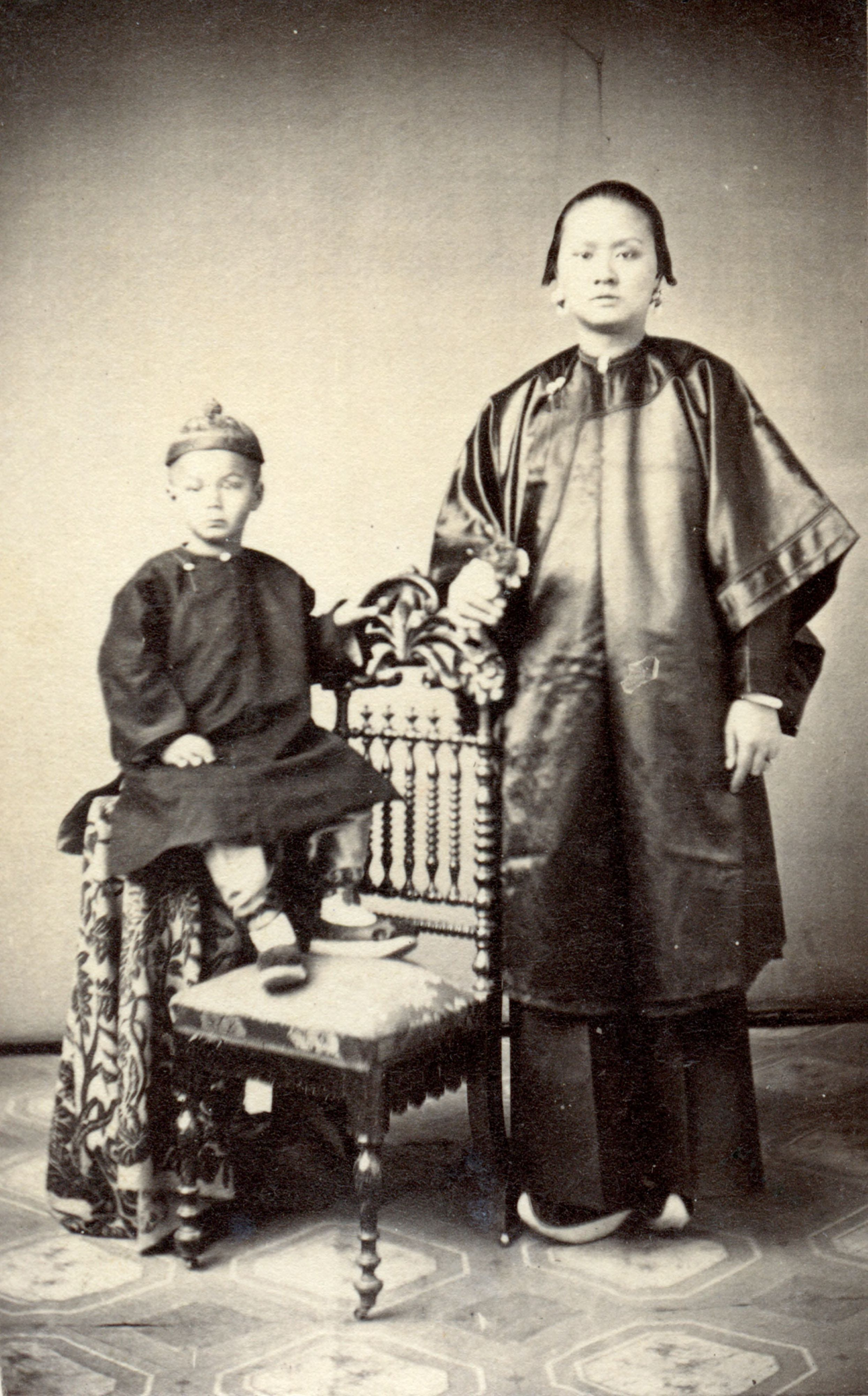
Among the early Chinese immigrants, many Chinese women were uniformly called "China Mary." Because local people didn't want to remember their names, or to Americans, all Chinese women were the same to them.

== Ah Yuen ==
Ah Yuen was probably born in southern China between 1848 and 1854, and she came to the United States from Guangdong Province in 1863 as a prostitute. At that time, many Chinese women worked in this industry either voluntarily or forcibly. They were all illiterate, and some came to the United States and were forced to sign (fingerprints) contracts they could not understand. One of the clauses in the contract was that if they take 10 days off due to illness, their contract will be automatically extended by one month.

After spending some time in Denver, Ah Yuen went to Bear River, Wyoming, in 1868, where there were many Chinese immigrant laborers building railroads. She worked as a cook for some time. During this time, she witnessed what is now known as the Bear River City Riot on November 19, 1868. Many people were lynched.

In 1880, she went to Park City, Utah. There she got married and opened a store with her husband. In 1900, after her husband died, she moved to Evanston, Wyoming. Ah Yuen was said to be a cheerful person who spoke English fluently. There, she charged tourists 10 cents if they wanted to take her picture. She lived in Evanston until her death on January 13, 1939. In Evanston, there is also a street named "China Mary Road".

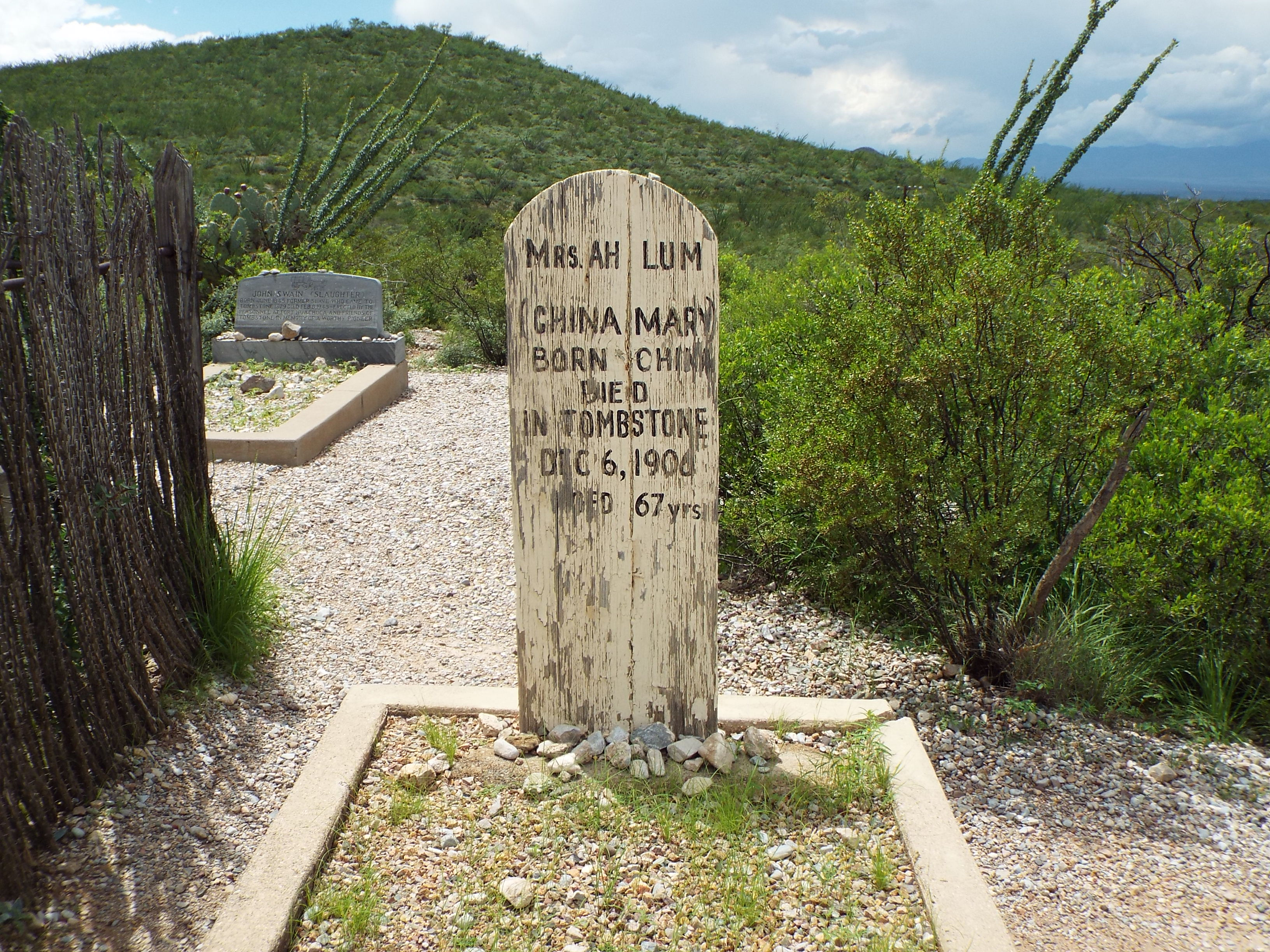
Tomb of Tombstone, Arizona's China Mary

== Ah Fuh ==
Ah Fuh was also known as Sing Deuh, Qui Fah, called "China Mary" by Alaskans.

She fled her home in China when she was nine, came to Canada when she was 13 and worked as a maid before being forced into prostitution. In 1895, when she was 15 years old, she married Ji Bang, a Chinese man who held an American visa. As a result, she moved to Sitka, Alaska. She and her husband managed restaurants and bakeries, and learned the local indigenous language, and became midwives to the indigenous communities; they were said to have never had a delivery fail.

After her husband died in 1902, she used the money he left to open a restaurant and a laundromat in her home. In 1903, she married Sing Li. Shortly after this marriage, she sent her eldest daughter Catherine to school in Victoria. On the way to college, Catherine became ill and died. Afterwards, she took her young daughter Anna with her second husband to Chicago, where she met Fred Johnson, a new Swedish-Finn immigrant. In order to marry Fred Johnson, she sued her second husband Sing Li and successfully divorced him in 1909.

Afterwards, she and her third husband, Fred, moved back to Sitka, where they lived out the rest of their lives. During her life, she worked as a dairy farmer, fox breeder, miner, midwife, hunter, and fishwife. She even served as a nurse manager in a federal prison. She died in 1958.

== China Mary of Tombstone, Arizona ==
There was a China Mary who lived in Tombstone, Arizona by the 1880s; her real name is attributed as Ah Chum or Sing Choy. She was originally from Guangdong province, and her father had worked as a gold miner in California.

She was an influential businesswoman in the Chinese immigrant community in Tombstone, and worked to find jobs for Chinese laborers outside of the community as well. Mary ran a general store, gambling houses, brothels, and opium dens. She also ran the Can Can Restaurant alongside her husband Ah Lum, and Quong Gu Kee. Mary also invested in various businesses in Tombstone. She was remembered as an honest, generous, stubborn, and kind person.

She died in December 1906 from heart failure, and was buried in Tombstone's Boot Hill Cemetery.

She was portrayed in an episode of the 1955 television series The Life and Legend of Wyatt Earp by Chinese-American actress Anna May Wong.
