= John Straley =

American poet

- Born: Redwood City, California, U.S.
- Education: Grinnell College; University of Washington
- Occupation: Mystery writer
- Writing career
- Genres: Detective fiction, historical fiction
- Website: www.johnstraley.com

John Straley is a poet and author of detective fiction. He currently resides in Sitka, Alaska.

== Biography ==
John Straley was born in Redwood City, California. He grew up in the Seattle area and attended high school in New York City. Straley trained, with encouragement from his parents, to be a horseshoer. He attended Grinnell College before transferring to the University of Washington for a degree in writing. After college and a stint in Eastern Washington, he followed his wife to Sitka, Alaska in 1977. After moving through a number of jobs he became a private investigator. In 1985, he became a staff investigator for the Alaska Public Defender's office in Sitka, a position he held until 2015. As an investigator, he continued to write. After being turned down by publishers numerous times, in 1991 he received a tip from friend and anthropologist Richard Nelson that New York City-based Soho Press was interested in detective fiction novels. Upon submitting his manuscript for The Woman Who Married a Bear, Soho Press expressed interest in his work. After a run of mysteries, he is now looking outside of his trademark Cecil Younger series for future books.

In 2006, he was named writer laureate for the State of Alaska; he served in that position until 2008.

In 2008, Alaska Northwest Books published Straley's The Big Both Ways, a historical fiction work based in the Pacific Northwest. Since then his work has been primarily in creating poetry.

In 2014, SOHO Press published Straley's latest book, Cold Storage, Alaska.

Straley returned to the Cecil Younger series, with the first book since 2001, with the release of Baby's First Felony, in July 2018 (Soho Press).

== Bibliography ==
=== Cecil Younger series ===
- The Woman Who Married a Bear (1992)—winner of the 1993 Shamus Award
- The Curious Eat Themselves (1993)
- The Music of What Happens (1996)—winner of the Spotted Owl Award
- Death and the Language of Happiness (1997)
- The Angels Will not Care (1998)
- Cold Water Burning (2001)
- Baby's First Felony (2018)
- So Far and Good (2021)

=== Cold Storage series ===
- The Big Both Ways (2008)
- Cold Storage, Alaska (2014)
- What is Time to a Pig? (2020)
- Blown By the Same Wind (2022)

=== Poetry ===
- The Rising and the Rain (2008)

=== Other writing ===
- Short stories:
  - "Life Before the War"—published in Men from Boys
  - "Finding Lou"—published in The Mysterious North
- Essays:
  - Published in The Nation, Alaska magazine
  - "Love, Crime and Joyriding on a Dead-End Road"—published in The Book of the Tongass (1999)
