= Eastern Channel =

Body of deep water adjacent to Sitka, Alaska

Coordinates: 57°01′02″N 135°19′19″W

Eastern Channel is a body of deep water adjacent to the southern half of Sitka, Alaska. It is the best suited of three channels for large ships to approach the harbor in Sitka.

Because Sitka is a prime cruise ship destination, but has no deep water docks, the ships anchor in Eastern Channel and the passengers travel the last two miles to the coast via ferry. Eastern Channel leads most directly to Silver Bay, but also allows access to downtown Sitka.

Eastern Channel is also the backdrop behind the stage at Harrigan Centennial Hall and the Sitka Summer Music Festival.
