= Sheet'ká Ḵwáan Naa Kahídi =

Coordinates: 57.0502°N 135.3388°W

The Sheet'ká Ḵwáan Naa Kahídi is a performance venue and meeting space modelled after a Tlingit clan house in Sitka, Alaska. Its capacity is 300 people. Some translate the building's name to "The House of the Sitka People." It is also known as the "Community House." It is the home of the largest hand-carved house screen in Southeast Alaska.

Every summer the Naa Kahídi Dancers use the house to perform for tourists, singing and drumming songs that tell stories of Tlingit legend. The building is owned by Sitka Tribe of Alaska.

== History ==
It is built on the location of the former school for Native children in Sitka, non-native children also attended in the 1960s, it was called Front Street Elementary . It was built in 1997.
