= List of the oldest buildings in Alaska =

This article lists the oldest extant buildings in Alaska, including extant buildings and structures constructed prior to and during the United States rule over Alaska. Only buildings built prior to 1880 are suitable for inclusion on this list, or the building must be the oldest of its type.

In order to qualify for the list, a structure must:

- be a recognizable building (defined as any human-made structure used or intended for supporting or sheltering any use or continuous occupancy);
- incorporate features of building work from the claimed date to at least 1.5 metres (4.9 ft) in height and/or be a listed building.

This consciously excludes ruins of limited height, roads and statues. Bridges may be included if they otherwise fulfill the above criteria. Dates for many of the oldest structures have been arrived at by radiocarbon dating or dendrochronology and should be considered approximate. If the exact year of initial construction is estimated, it will be shown as a range of dates.

== List of oldest buildings ==
Building	Image	Location	First built	Use	Notes
Russian-American Magazin		Kodiak, Alaska	1810	storage facility	Oldest building in Alaska
Church of the Holy Ascension		Unalaska, Alaska	1826	Church	Earliest surviving Russian church in Alaska
Russian Bishop's House		Sitka, Alaska	1841–1843	Church	Early Russian architecture
Russian-American Building No. 29		Sitka, Alaska	1867	Commercial	Only Russian commercial building surviving in Sitka
J. M. Davis House		Juneau, Alaska	1894	Residence	Possibly oldest house in Juneau
Oscar Gill House		Anchorage, Alaska	1913	Residence	Possibly oldest house in Anchorage; Moved several times.
Wendler Building		Anchorage, Alaska	1915	Commercial	Oldest commercial building in Anchorage.

== See also ==
- National Register of Historic Places listings in Alaska
- History of Alaska
- Oldest buildings in the United States
