= National Register of Historic Places listings in Anchorage, Alaska =

Location of Anchorage in the State of Alaska

This is a list of the National Register of Historic Places listings in Anchorage, Alaska.

This is intended to be a complete list of the properties and districts on the National Register of Historic Places in Anchorage, Alaska, United States. The locations of National Register properties and districts for which the latitude and longitude coordinates are included below, may be seen in an online map.

There are currently 37 properties and districts listed on the National Register in the city. One additional property was previously listed but has since been removed from the register.

== Current listings ==
This National Park Service list is complete through NPS recent listings posted July 10, 2026.

	Name on the Register	Image	Date listed	Location	City or town	Description
1	A.E.C. Cottage No. 23	A.E.C. Cottage No. 23	June 11, 1990 (#90000825)	618 Christensen Drive; 61°13′12″N 149°53′41″W	Anchorage	
2	Alaska Engineering Commission Cottage No. 25	Alaska Engineering Commission Cottage No. 25	February 16, 1996 (#96000094)	645 West Third Avenue; 61°13′11″N 149°53′43″W	Anchorage	
3	Mike Alex Cabin		September 8, 1982 (#82002071)	Off Alaska Route 1; 61°27′37″N 149°21′38″W	Eklutna	
4	Anchorage Cemetery	Anchorage Cemetery	April 26, 1993 (#93000320)	535 East 9th Avenue; 61°12′54″N 149°52′34″W	Anchorage	
5	Anchorage City Hall	Anchorage City Hall	December 2, 1980 (#80000745)	524 West Fourth Avenue; 61°13′06″N 149°53′33″W	Anchorage	The city's 1936 city hall.
6	Anchorage Depot	Anchorage Depot	August 27, 1999 (#99001027)	411 West First Avenue; 61°13′18″N 149°53′26″W	Anchorage	
7	Anchorage Hotel Annex	Anchorage Hotel Annex	April 15, 1999 (#99000443)	330 E Street; 61°13′08″N 149°53′30″W	Anchorage	
8	Oscar Anderson House	Oscar Anderson House	June 13, 1978 (#78000514)	420 M Street; 61°13′07″N 149°54′22″W	Anchorage	
9	Beluga Point Site	Beluga Point Site	March 30, 1978 (#78000515)	Address restricted	Anchorage	
10	Block 13 Army Housing Association Historic District		December 3, 2018 (#100003171)	E 10th & 11th Aves., Barrow & Cordova Sts. 61°12′44″N 149°52′49″W	Anchorage	
11	Campus Center	Campus Center	June 22, 1979 (#79000409)	4101 University Drive; 61°11′27″N 149°48′12″W	Anchorage	Also known as Atwood Campus Center of Alaska Pacific University.
12	Civil Works Residential Dwellings	Civil Works Residential Dwellings	July 21, 2004 (#04000717)	786 and 800 Delaney Street; 61°13′40″N 149°53′20″W	Anchorage	
13	Crow Creek Consolidated Gold Mining Company	Crow Creek Consolidated Gold Mining Company	September 13, 1978 (#78000517)	Crow Creek Road; 61°00′01″N 149°04′57″W	Girdwood	
14	Leopold David House	Leopold David House	July 24, 1986 (#86001900)	605 West Second Avenue; 61°13′15″N 149°53′38″W	Anchorage	
15	Eklutna Power Plant	Eklutna Power Plant	June 20, 1980 (#80000746)	Northeast of central Anchorage; 61°27′30″N 149°20′24″W	Anchorage	Anchorage's first hydroelectric plant, built 1929. Currently known as the Old Eklutna Power Plant as a new dam and power plant has been built elsewhere in 1955.
16	Federal Building-U.S. Courthouse	Federal Building-U.S. Courthouse	June 23, 1978 (#78000516)	605 West Fourth Avenue; 61°13′08″N 149°53′40″W	Anchorage	
17	Fort Richardson National Cemetery	Fort Richardson National Cemetery	March 7, 2012 (#12000056)	Building 58-512, Davis Highway; 61°16′31″N 149°39′37″W	Fort Richardson	
18	Fourth Avenue Theatre	Fourth Avenue Theatre	October 5, 1982 (#82001620)	630 West Fourth Avenue; 61°13′06″N 149°53′40″W	Anchorage	
19	Oscar Gill House	Oscar Gill House	February 2, 2001 (#01000022)	1344 West Tenth Avenue; 61°12′45″N 149°54′34″W	Anchorage	Originally built in the town of Knik in 1913, moved to 918 West Tenth Avenue in 1916 and to its current location during the 1980s.
20	Government Hill Federal Housing Historic District	Government Hill Federal Housing Historic District	January 14, 2015 (#14001147)	W. Harvard, Delaney & Brown Sts. 61°13′43″N 149°53′11″W	Anchorage	
21	Greater Friendship Baptist Church	Greater Friendship Baptist Church	June 21, 2019 (#100003109)	903 E 13th Ave. 61°12′36″N 149°51′59″W	Anchorage	
22	Indian Valley Mine		October 25, 1989 (#89001762)	Address restricted	Indian	
23	KENI Radio Building	KENI Radio Building	April 18, 1988 (#88000380)	1777 Forest Park Drive; 61°12′19″N 149°55′31″W	Anchorage	
24	Kimball's Store	Kimball's Store	July 24, 1986 (#86001901)	500 and 504 West Fifth Avenue; 61°13′03″N 149°53′30″W	Anchorage	
25	Kulis Hangar 1, Building 3		March 4, 2019 (#100003385)	5005 Raspberry Rd. 61°09′33″N 149°58′21″W	Anchorage	
26	Loussac-Sogn Building	Loussac-Sogn Building	May 20, 1998 (#98000567)	429 D Street; 61°13′04″N 149°53′20″W	Anchorage	
27	McKinley Tower Apartments	McKinley Tower Apartments	September 12, 2008 (#08000882)	337 East Fourth Avenue; 61°13′08″N 149°52′39″W	Anchorage	
28	Mt. Alyeska Roundhouse	Mt. Alyeska Roundhouse	November 5, 2003 (#02000562)	Approximately 2 miles (3.2 km) west of Alyeska; 60°57′42″N 149°04′50″W	Girdwood	Mountaintop ski lodge and museum, an octagonal building, part of Alyeska Resort.
29	Old St. Nicholas Russian Orthodox Church	Old St. Nicholas Russian Orthodox Church	March 24, 1972 (#72000189)	Mile 1/2, Eklutna Village Road; 61°27′38″N 149°21′42″W	Eklutna	
30	Pilgrim 100B Aircraft	Pilgrim 100B Aircraft	August 7, 1986 (#86002230)	Alaska Aviation Heritage Museum; 61°10′45″N 149°58′23″W	Anchorage	Originally listed at Dillingham Airport, this aircraft is now in the collection of the Alaska Aviation Heritage Museum.
31	Pioneer School House	Pioneer School House	December 3, 1980 (#80000747)	437 East 3rd Avenue; 61°13′12″N 149°52′32″W	Anchorage	
32	Potter Section House	Potter Section House	December 6, 1985 (#85003113)	Off Alaska Route 1; 61°03′07″N 149°47′49″W	Anchorage	
33	Site Summit	Site Summit	July 11, 1996 (#96000691)	Off Arctic Valley Road, 12.5 miles (20.1 km) east of central Anchorage; 61°15′07″N 149°32′23″W	Anchorage	The historical 244 acres (99 ha) area covers the Battery Area to the north and the Launch Area to the south.
34	Spring Creek Lodge	Spring Creek Lodge	September 9, 2001 (#01000938)	18939 Old Glenn Highway; 61°23′28″N 149°28′03″W	Chugiak	
35	Temnac P-38G Lightning	Temnac P-38G Lightning	June 26, 1979 (#79000406)	McCloud Memorial Park, Elmendorf Air Force Base; 61°14′54″N 149°48′07″W	Anchorage	A P-38G grounded on Attu Island during World War II, it was recovered in the 1990s, restored, and moved to its current location in April 2000.
36	Wendler Building	Wendler Building	June 24, 1988 (#88000730)	400 D Street; 61°13′06″N 149°53′23″W	Anchorage	Originally located at intersection of 4th Avenue and I Street, the building was moved to its current location during the 1980s.
37	The Wireless Station	The Wireless Station	December 1, 2015 (#15000843)	124, 132 and 140 East Manor Avenue; 61°13′45″N 149°52′53″W	Anchorage	

== Former listing ==
	Name on the Register	Image	Date listed	Date removed	Location	City or town	Description
1	Lathrop Building		April 22, 1984 (#84000629)	October 19, 1987	801 W. 4th Ave. 61°13′09″N 149°53′36″W	Anchorage	

== See also ==
- List of National Historic Landmarks in Alaska
- National Register of Historic Places listings in Alaska
