= Mike Alex Cabin =

Historic house in Alaska, United States

- U.S. National Register of Historic Places
- Alaska Heritage Resources Survey
- Location within Alaska
- Location: Off AK 1, Eklutna, Alaska
- Coordinates: 61°27′37″N 149°21′38″W
- Area: 5 acres (2.0 ha)
- Built by: Chief Mike Alex
- NRHP reference No.: 82002071
- AHRS No.: ANC-111

Significant dates
- Added to NRHP: September 8, 1982
- Designated AHRS: 1980

The Mike Alex Cabin is a historic log cabin in Eklutna, Alaska. Located across from Eklutna's Russian Orthodox churches in the center of the community, it was built in 1925 for Mike Alex, the last traditional clan chieftain of the Athabaskan people in Eklutna. It consists of three sides of an originally square log structure, to which a log addition was made in the 1930s, removing one of the original four walls. The building was around that time also topped by a new gable roof. It is, along with the older church, a reminder of the people's history.

The cabin was listed on the National Register of Historic Places.

== See also ==
- National Register of Historic Places listings in Anchorage, Alaska
