= Wireless station =

Wireless station can refer to

- Two-way radio station
- Radio station
- Wireless telegraph station
- Wireless base station
- The Wireless Station, a historic building in Anchorage, Alaska, US
