= Russian-American Building No. 29 =

- U.S. National Register of Historic Places
- U.S. National Historic Landmark
- Alaska Heritage Resources Survey
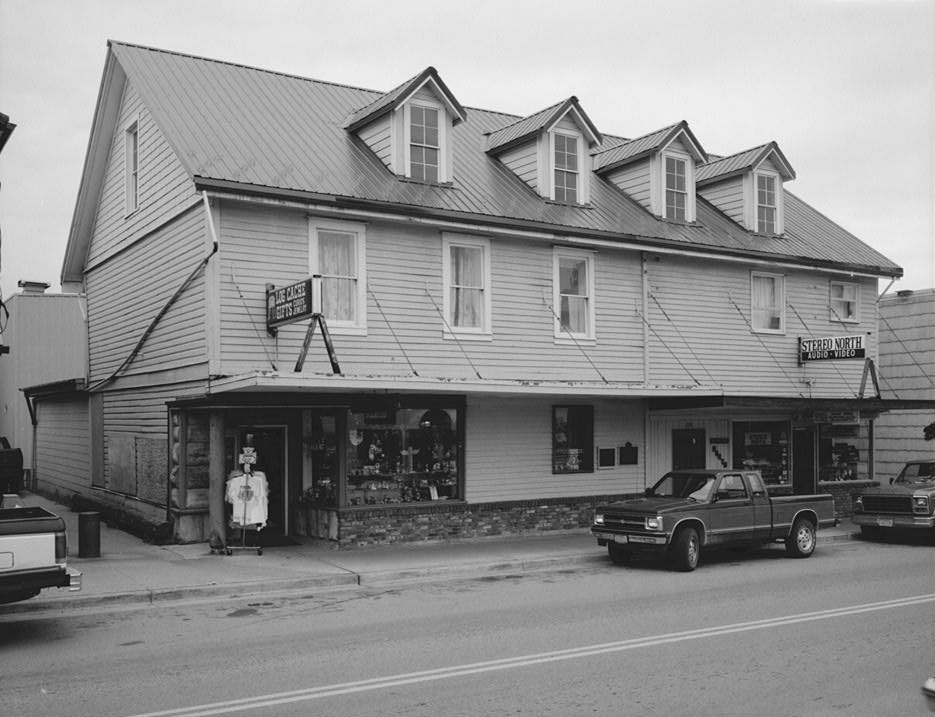
- Street view of the building

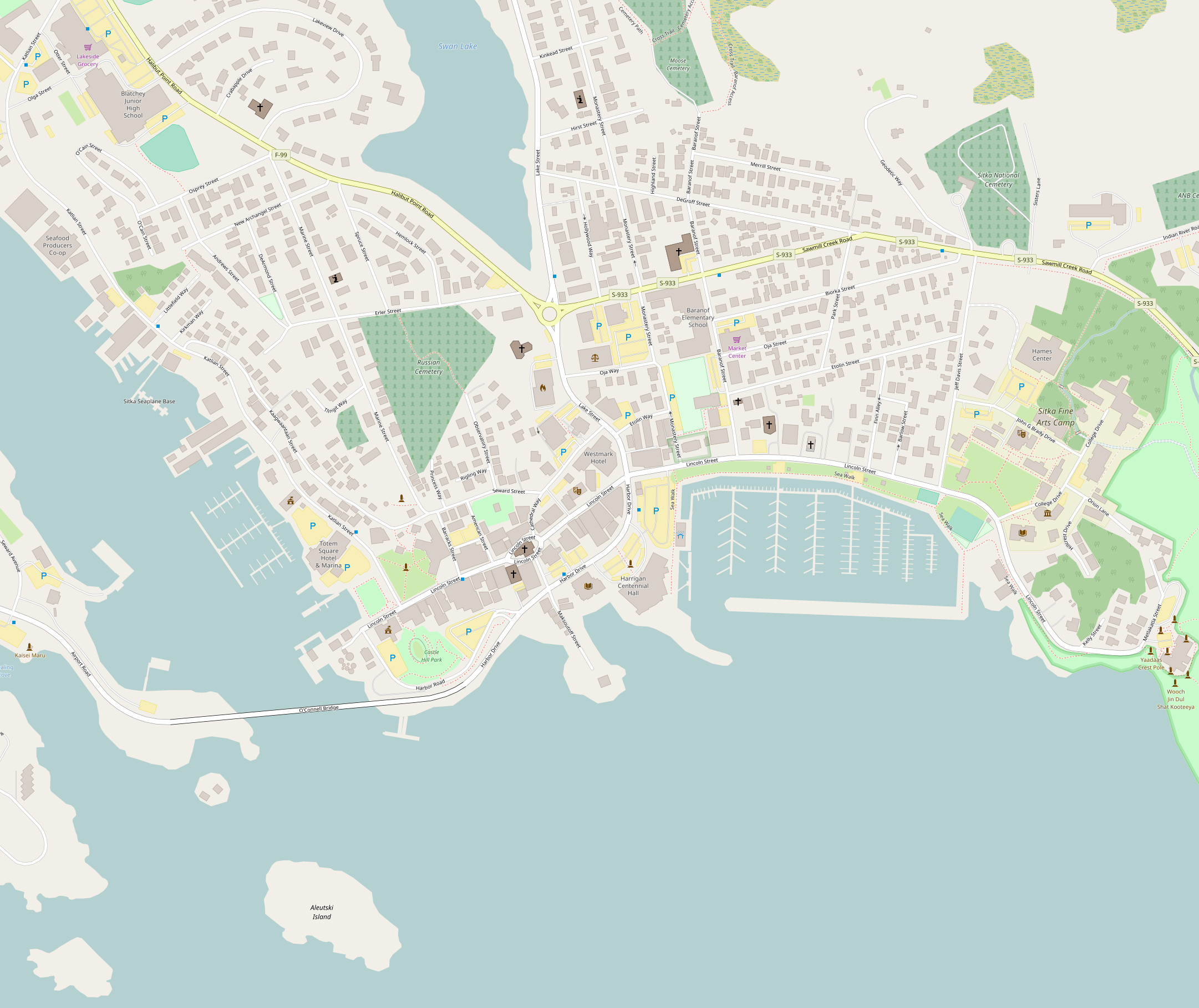
- Location within Downtown Sitka Location within Alaska
- Location: 202-206 Lincoln Street, Sitka, Alaska
- Coordinates: 57°02′59″N 135°20′11″W
- Area: less than one acre
- Built: 1850
- Architect: Russian American Company
- NRHP reference No.: 87001282
- AHRS No.: SIT-013

Significant dates
- Added to NRHP: May 28, 1987
- Designated NHL: May 28, 1987

The Russian-American Building No. 29 (Russian: Российско-Американское Здание № 29), also known as Tilson Building or Building No. 29, Sitka, is a historic commercial building at 202-206 Lincoln Street in Sitka, Alaska. A National Historic Landmark, it is the only Russian colonial commercial structure standing in Sitka, and one of only two Russian colonial buildings in the city (the other is the Russian Bishop's House, also a National Historic Landmark.)

== Description ==
The original portion of the building is a square log structure, 2-1/2 stories tall, measuring about 28 feet (8.5 m) (four sazhen) square, and resting on a raised stone foundation. A two-story gallery, sheltered by a shed roof, extended to the east. The outside logs from which it is built were squared off to 18 inches (46 cm). The interior walls are built from dimensionally smaller logs, and the floors were made of half-logs secured into joists and sills by tenons. The structure is estimated to have been built in the 1840s, at a time when many buildings were built by Finnish laborers brought in by Russian administrators, and was first used as for residential purposes.

The building has undergone a number of alterations in the intervening time, but these have managed to preserve much of its historic fabric. It is unknown if it was sided at the time of its construction, but early images depict it with the same type of shiplap siding it has today. Early images also show a two-story ell to its rear. The building was originally built with its back directly on the waterfront; infill has created new land in this area.

In the 1880s the building underwent significant alterations. An addition extended the gallery area further to the east, and a new roof fully incorporated this space into the structure. Window spacing on this addition was made to match that of the main block, and the new roof was augmented by four equally-spaced gable-roof dormers. The building underwent further modernizing work in the 1960s, some of which was in response to deterioration of the log structure. It was the subject of a major rehabilitative effort in the mid-1980s.

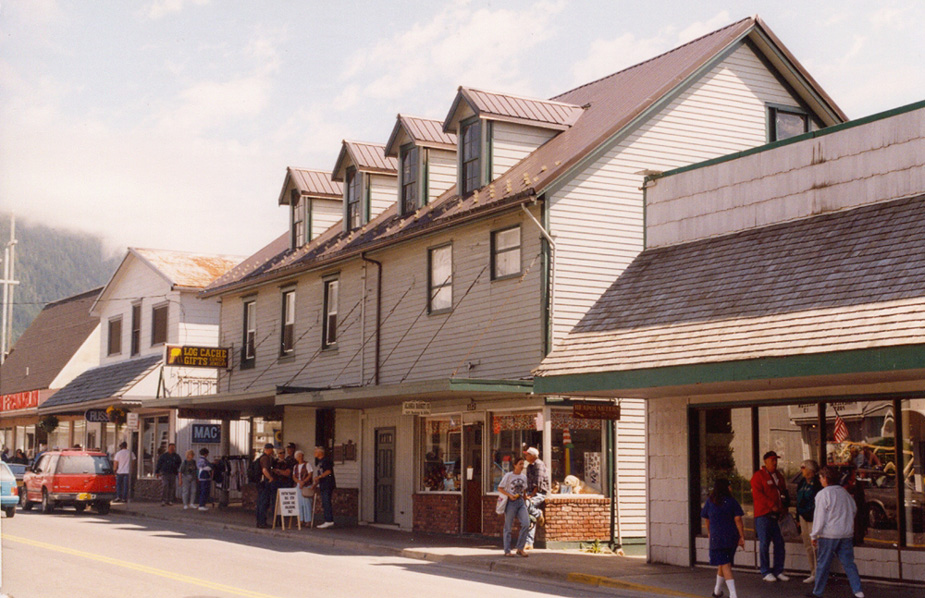
View of the building in 1997

The building was declared a National Historic Landmark and listed on the National Register of Historic Places in 1987.

== See also ==
- National Register of Historic Places in Sitka, Alaska
- List of National Historic Landmarks in Alaska
- List of the oldest buildings in Alaska
