= Old Anchorage City Hall =

- Anchorage City Hall
- U.S. National Register of Historic Places
- Alaska Heritage Resources Survey
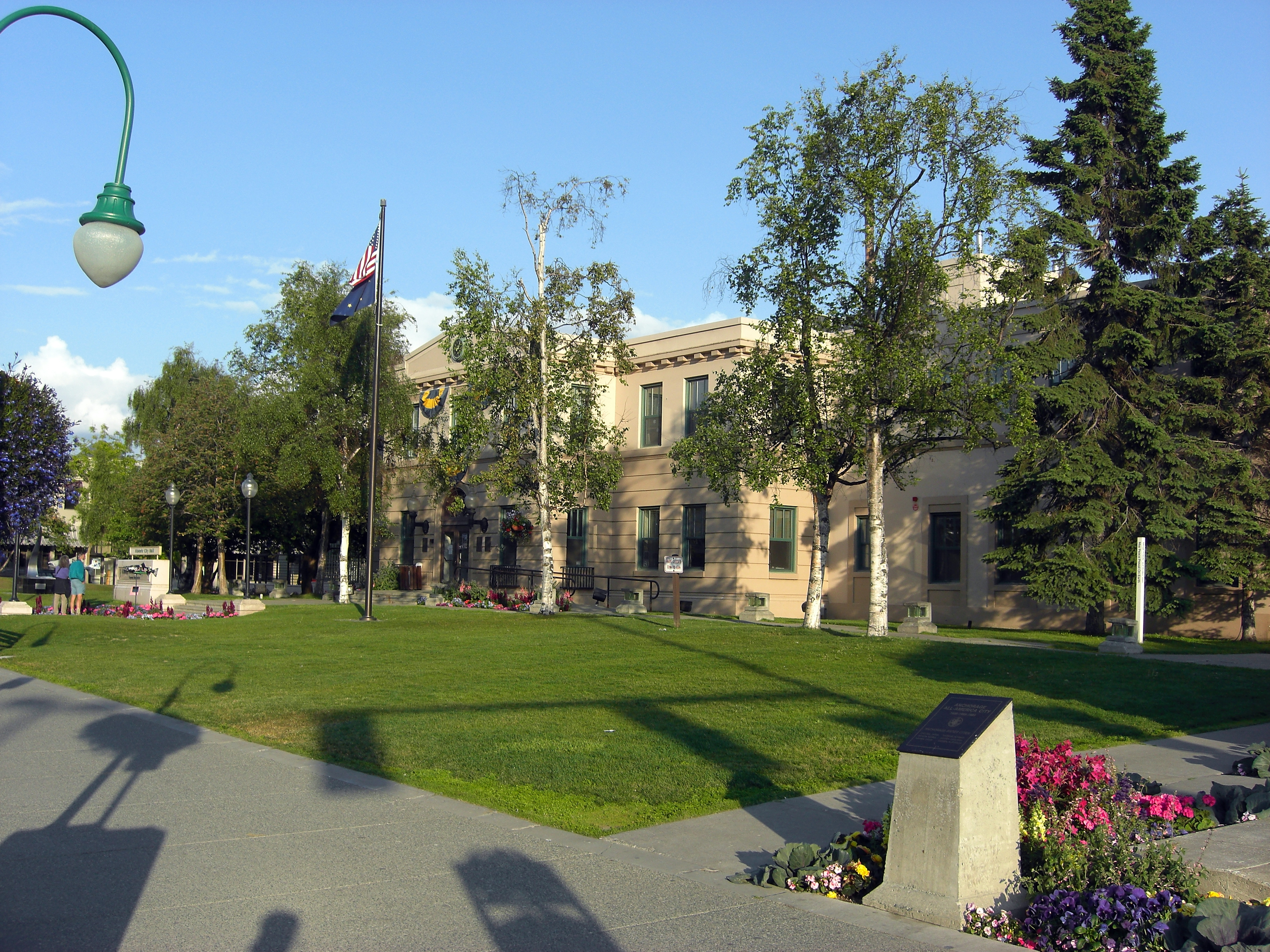

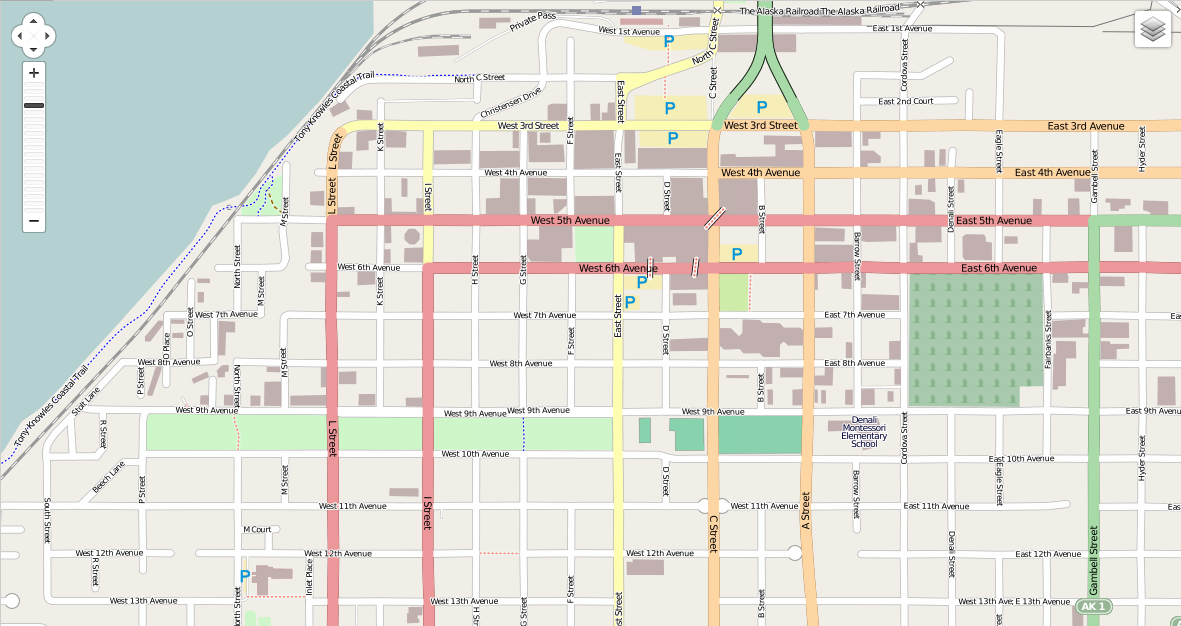
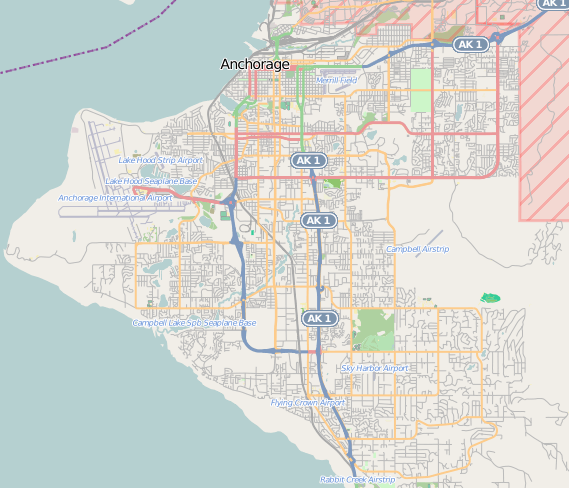
- Location within Downtown Anchorage Location within Anchorage Location within Alaska
- Location: 524 West 4th Avenue, Anchorage, Alaska
- Coordinates: 61°13′6″N 149°53′33″W
- Area: 0.5 acres (0.20 ha)
- Built: 1936
- Built by: Gastineau Construction Co.
- Architect: E. Ellsworth Sedille
- NRHP reference No.: 80000745
- AHRS No.: ANC-240
- Added to NRHP: December 2, 1980

The Old Anchorage City Hall, also known as Historic City Hall, is located at 524 West Fourth Avenue in Anchorage, Alaska. It is a two-story cast concrete building, designed by E. Ellsworth Sedille and built in 1936 with funding from the Public Works Administration. It housed the city administration of the city until 1979, when most of the integrated city-borough administration was moved to the Hill Building at 632 West 6th Avenue.

The old city hall started the second generation of municipal architecture in the city, moving from frame construction to reinforced concrete. The building was listed on the National Register of Historic Places in 1980.

The building now houses the sales staff for Visit Anchorage, formerly the Anchorage Convention & Visitors Bureau.

== See also ==
- National Register of Historic Places listings in Anchorage, Alaska
