= Kodiak History Museum =

- Russian-American Magazin; Kodiak History Museum
- U.S. National Register of Historic Places
- U.S. National Historic Landmark
- Alaska Heritage Resources Survey
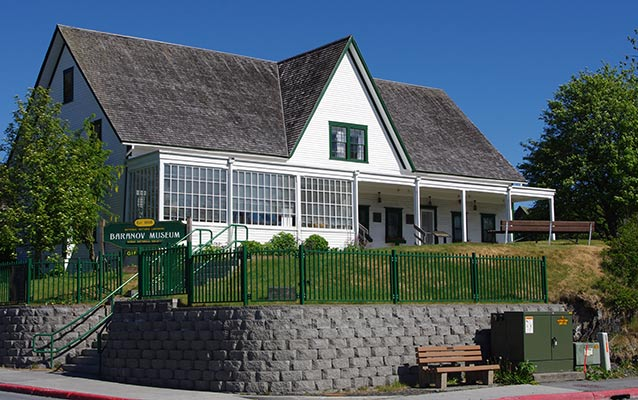
- Modern view of the building

- Location within Alaska
- Location: 101 East Marine Way, Kodiak, Alaska
- Coordinates: 57°47′16″N 152°24′12″W
- Area: less than one acre
- Built: 1808
- Built by: Russian-American Company
- NRHP reference No.: 66000954
- AHRS No.: KOD-123

Significant dates
- Added to NRHP: October 15, 1966
- Designated NHL: June 13, 1962

The Kodiak History Museum, until 2019 known as the Baranov Museum, is a history museum at 101 East Marine Way in Kodiak, Alaska. It is located in a National Historic Landmark building known as the Russian-American Magazin [sic] and the Erskine House, which also houses the office of the Kodiak Historical Society. Built c. 1810, the building is the oldest of four surviving building constructed by the Russians when Alaska was a Russian territory. The museum's collections and exhibits are focused on the history of the Kodiak Archipelago and the Aleutian Islands, with particular focus on the Russian and early American periods. The museum's current director is Kristin O'Lear.

== Architecture and building history ==
The community now known as Kodiak was established in 1793 as Pavlovsk; it was the first permanent Russian settlement in North America, and served as its territorial capital until 1808. This building was built in the first decade of the 19th century as a storage facility (or "magazin") by the Russian American Company. When Alaska came under American control, the building was purchased by the Alaska Commercial Company, which continued the business operations previously engaged in by the Russians. In 1911 the building was sold to W. J. Erskine, who used the building as a private residence, constructing a new stone foundation for the building and enclosing its porch. He sold it in 1948 to a company which rented it out. After the 1964 Alaska earthquake and tsunami damaged the city, the building was acquired by a government redevelopment authority. Ownership was eventually transferred to the city, which leased it in 1967 to the Kodiak Historical Society. The society has since maintained the property, using it for office space and as a museum. The building was declared a National Historic Landmark in 1962, and listed on the National Register of Historic Places in 1966.

The building is a large rectangular log structure, now resting on a concrete foundation (replacing Erskine's stone foundation). It is 2 1/2 stories in height, 36 feet (11 m) deep and 72 feet (22 m) wide, with a projecting front porch that is partially glassed in. It is finished in horizontal redwood siding, which covers older siding which may be Russian in origin. It has a steeply pitched gable roof, which is pierced on its main (southern) elevation by a single gabled dormer. The building's interior has been extensively altered to accommodate the historical society's uses, but much of its older fabric is still evident. The interior was originally divided into two large chambers separated by a log dividing wall that is still extant (with doorways cut through it at a later date), and the material that makes up the stairwell to the second floor also appear to be original. The upstairs has flooring that appears to be typical Russian manufacture.

== See also ==
- List of the oldest buildings in Alaska
