= Kimball's Store =

United States historic place in Anchorage, Alaska

- U.S. National Register of Historic Places
- Alaska Heritage Resources Survey
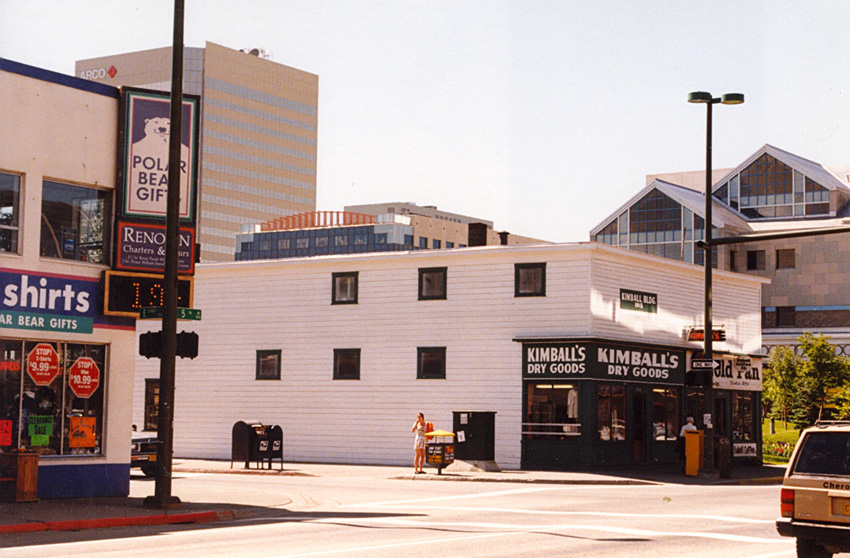
- The building in 1997

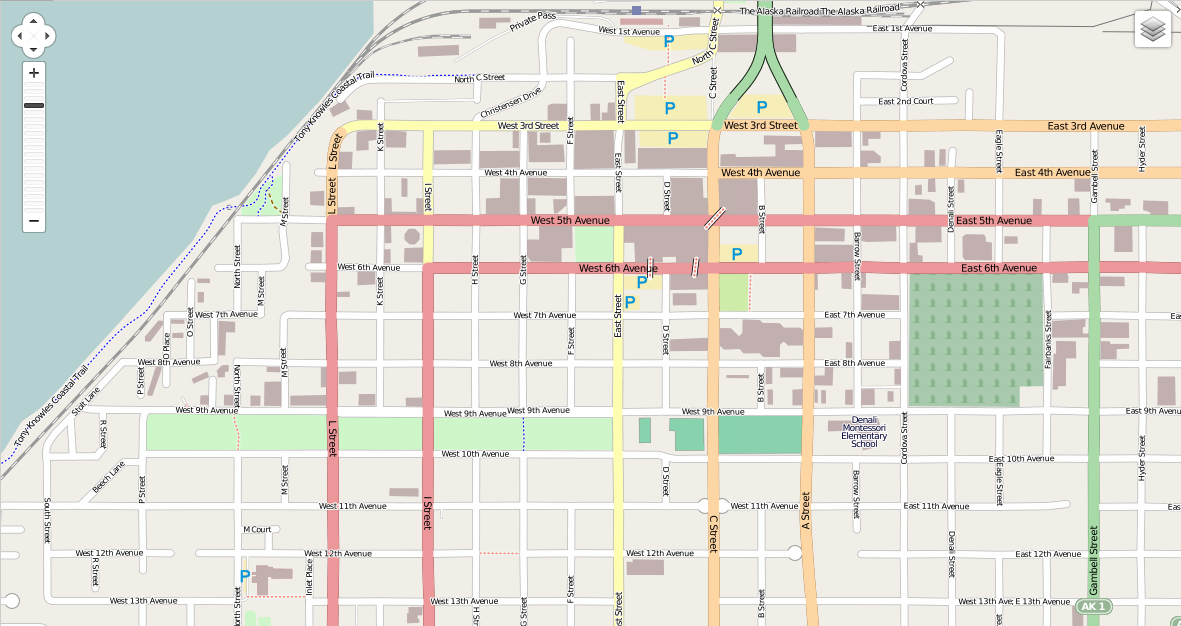
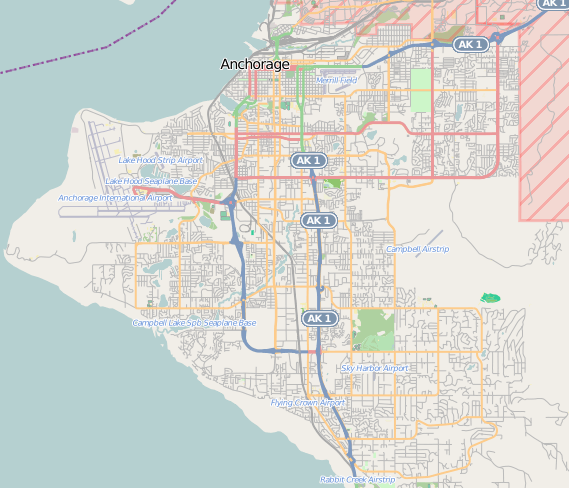
- Location within Downtown Anchorage Location within Anchorage Location within Alaska
- Location: 500 and 504 West 5th Avenue, Anchorage, Alaska
- Coordinates: 61°13′3″N 149°53′30″W
- Area: less than one acre
- Built: 1915
- Built by: Irving L. Kimball
- NRHP reference No.: 86001901
- AHRS No.: ANC-269

Significant dates
- Added to NRHP: July 24, 1986
- Designated AHRS: June 10, 1976

Kimball's Store, also known as Kimball Building, was a historic retail establishment at 500 and 504 West 5th Avenue in downtown Anchorage, Alaska. The dry goods store operated at the same site from 1915 to 2002, and its two-story wood-frame building is the only commercial building to survive at its original location from the period of Anchorage's founding. The store was established by Irving L. Kimball, who had been trading in Arctic communities of Alaska since 1897, and was operated afterward by his daughter until her death in 2002.

The building was listed on the National Register of Historic Places in 1986.

== See also ==
- National Register of Historic Places listings in Anchorage, Alaska
