= Spring Creek Lodge =

- U.S. National Register of Historic Places
- Alaska Heritage Resources Survey
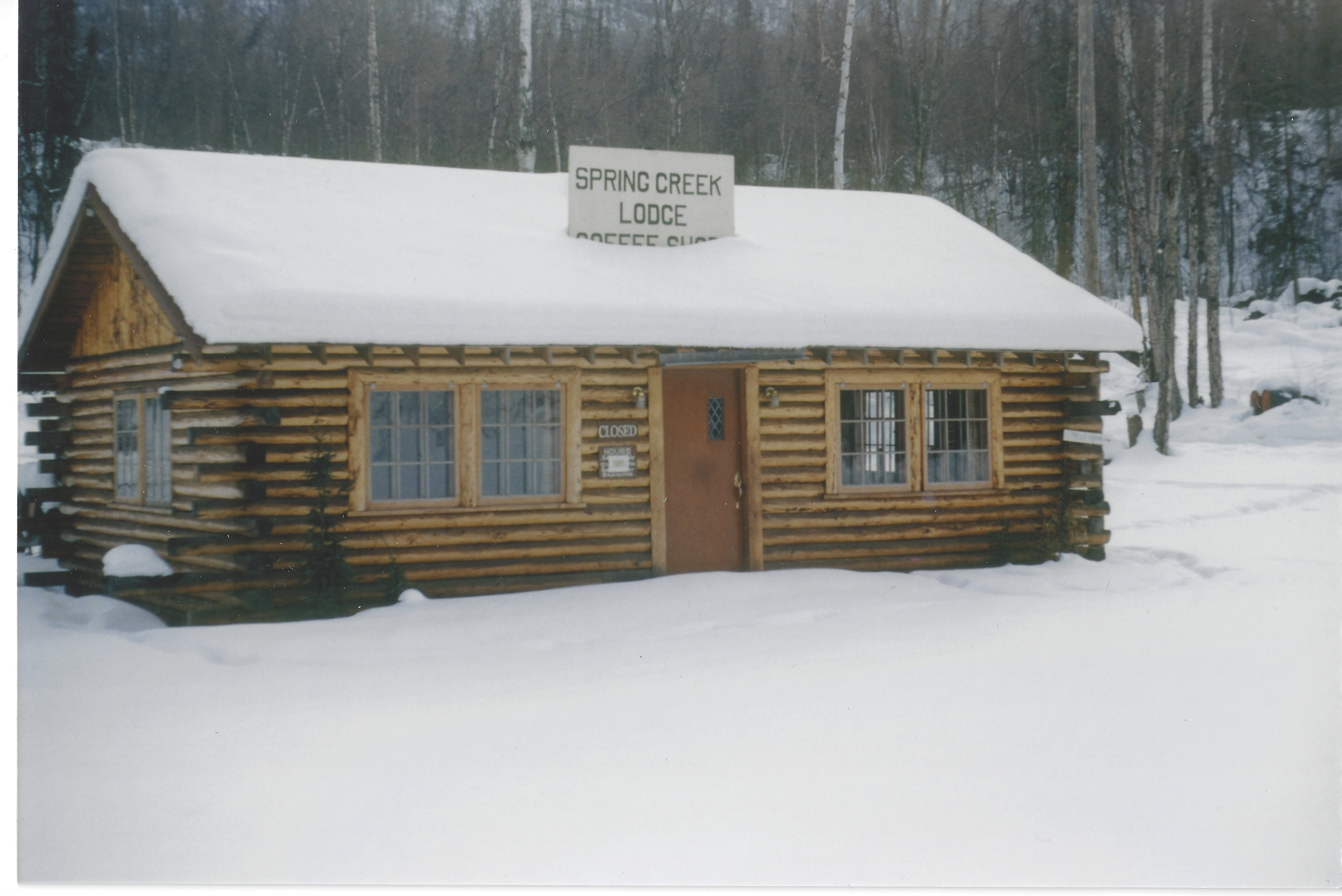
- The Spring Creek Lodge during the winter

- Location within Alaska
- Location: 18939 Old Glen Highway, Chugiak, Alaska
- Coordinates: 61°23′28″N 149°28′03″W
- Area: less than one acre
- Built: 1949
- Built by: Vernon Haik
- NRHP reference No.: 01000938
- AHRS No.: ANC-01109
- Added to NRHP: September 9, 2001

The Spring Creek Lodge is a historic former restaurant at 18389 Old Glenn Highway in the Chugiak area of Anchorage, Alaska. Vernon and Alma Haik built the Spring Creek Lodge in 1949. It served as an eatery and community center in southcentral Alaska from 1949 to 1974. For 25 years, the lodge served homesteaders, hunters from the Matanuska Valley, and military personnel from the Elmendorf Air Force Base and Fort Richardson in Anchorage. The lodge stands at Mile 20 on the two-lane Palmer Highway (now called Old Glenn Highway) halfway between Palmer and Anchorage. On September 9, 2001, the Spring Creek Lodge was inducted into the National Register of Historic Places "in recognition of its contributions to the cultural heritage of Alaska". The restaurant was a local landmark until its location was bypassed by the new Glenn Highway in 1969, after which it closed.

== See also ==
- National Register of Historic Places listings in Anchorage, Alaska
- Joint Base Elmendorf–Richardson
