= Site Summit =

- U.S. National Register of Historic Places
- U.S. Historic district
- Alaska Heritage Resources Survey
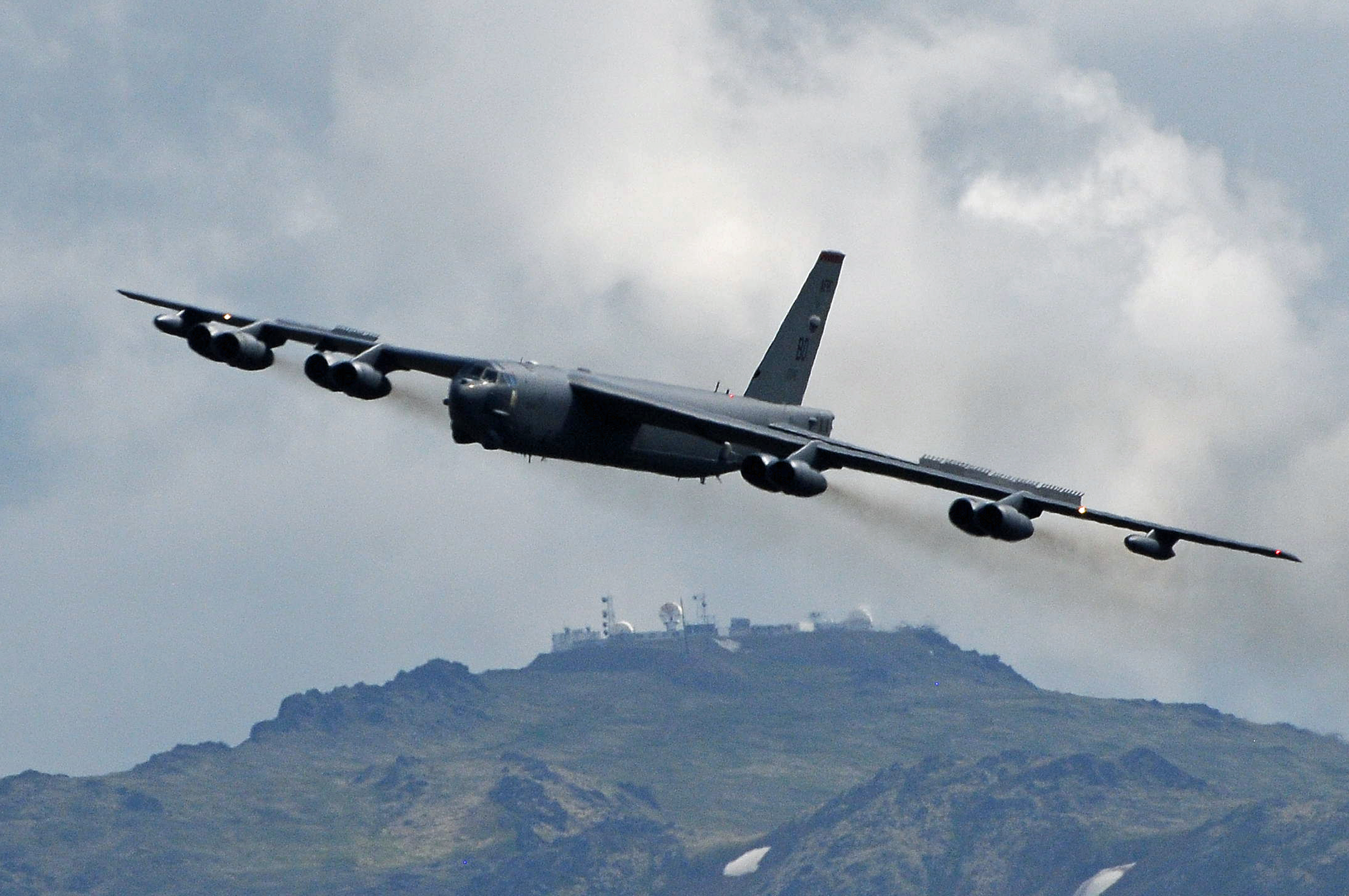
- Flyover of a B-52 with Site Summit in the background

- Location within Alaska
- Nearest city: Anchorage, Alaska
- Coordinates: 61°15′7″N 149°32′23″W
- Area: 244 acres (99 ha)
- Built: 1959
- Built by: Patti-MacDonald Company, M-B Contracting Company, US Army Corps of Engineers
- Architect: Leon Chatelain Jr., Spector and Montgomery Architects
- NRHP reference No.: 96000691
- AHRS No.: ANC-789
- Added to NRHP: July 11, 1996

The Nike Site Summit (or just Site Summit) is a historic military installation of the United States Army in Anchorage Borough, Alaska. The site, located in the Chugach Mountains overlooking Joint Base Elmendorf–Richardson, is the location of one of the best-preserved surviving Nike-Hercules missile installations in the state. The site's structures include a battery control area, a missile launch area, and several magazines. Units of the 43rd Air Defense Artillery Regiment, USARAL Artillery Group, United States Army Alaska, would have garrisoned the site. The site was built in 1957-58 and equipped with missiles in 1959. The site was in active service defending the United States from the threat of Soviet air strikes until it was decommissioned in 1979, after which sensitive militarily equipment (including missiles, radar equipment, and launch control equipment) was removed. The U.S. Army maintained the site into the 1980s before abandoning it. The site was listed on the National Register of Historic Places in 1996. A local non-profit group, Friends of Nike Site Summit, is actively attempting to preserve the site.

Site Summit was one of 145 Nike-Hercules sites that were built as a part of the defense network that protected the United States during the Cold War. In 1959–60, eight Nike missile sites were constructed in Alaska. The Nike sites in Alaska, including Site Summit, served a vital defense role due to their location—being between the Soviet Union and continental United States. Site Summit performed live fire tests of its Nike-Hercules missiles between 1960 and 1963, before the launches became dangerous due to the growing population of Anchorage.

The Nike-Hercules missile, the United States military's first anti-aircraft missile capable of being equipped with nuclear warheads, was a formidable defense weapon. The United States’ Nike-Hercules sites were created in response to the rising possibility of nuclear attack by Soviet bombers. Operation of Nike-Hercules sites such as Site Summit required 125 personnel. Despite the ability of Nike missiles, the advent of intercontinental missiles quickly made the Nike-Hercules missiles obsolete. Nike-Hercules sites began closing in 1965 and all Nike-Hercules sites had been decommissioned by 1975 except ones in Alaska and Florida—Site Summit in Anchorage and the Nike-Hercules site in Key West were the last two sites to close in 1979.

Friends of Nike Site Summit partnered with multiple state agencies in 2009 in order to restore the site. After three years of restoration, guided tours began in the summer of 2012.

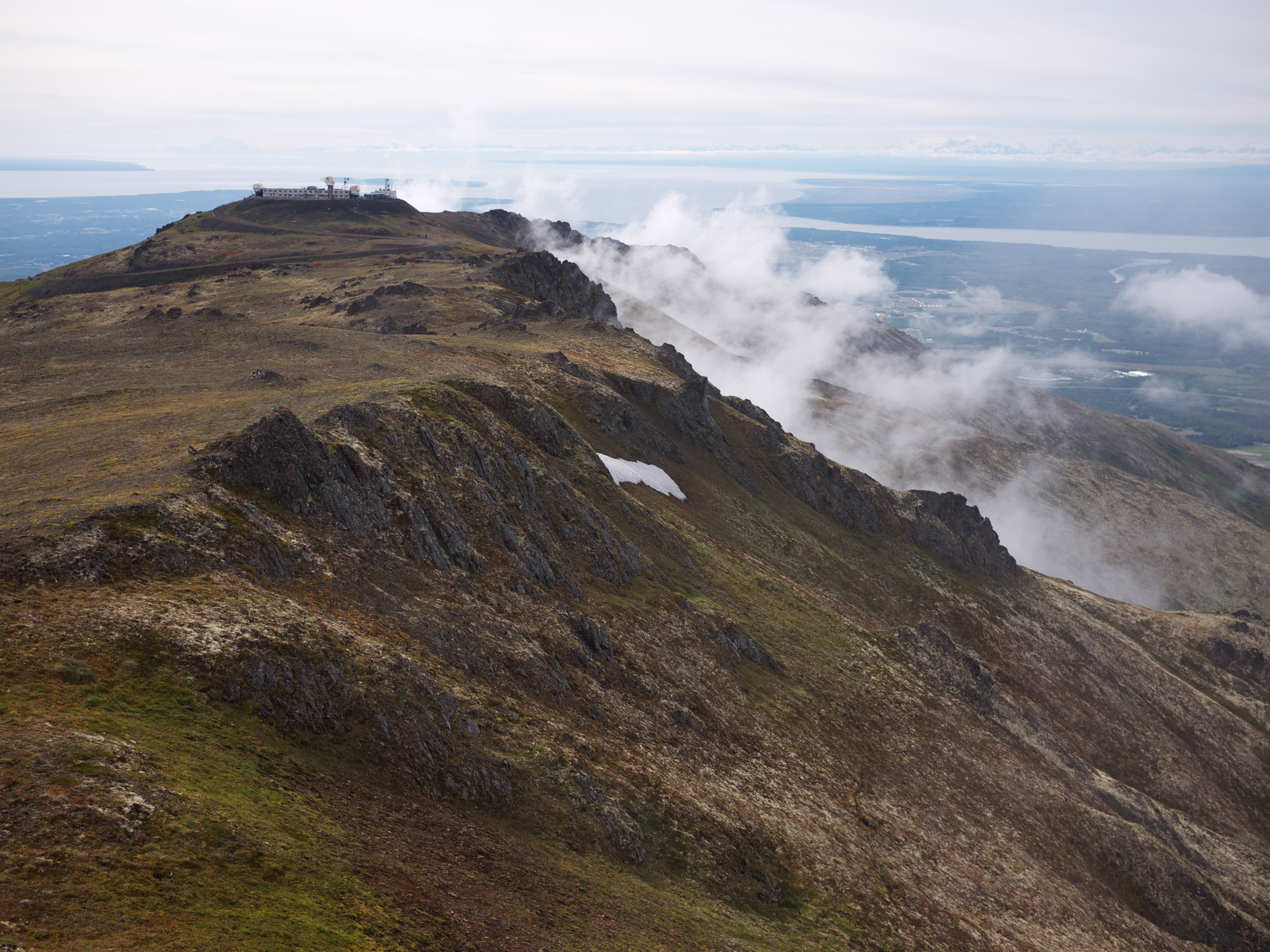
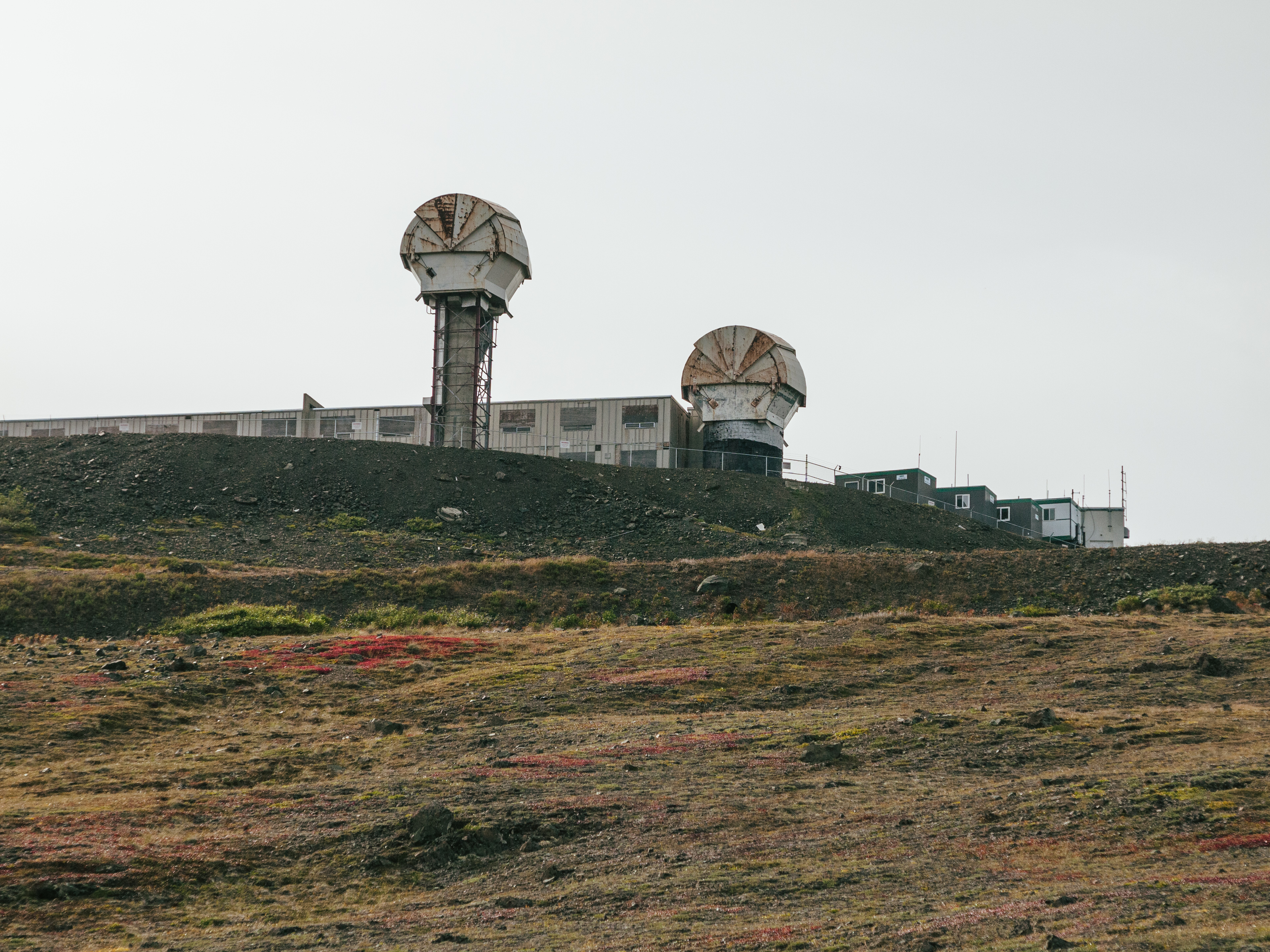
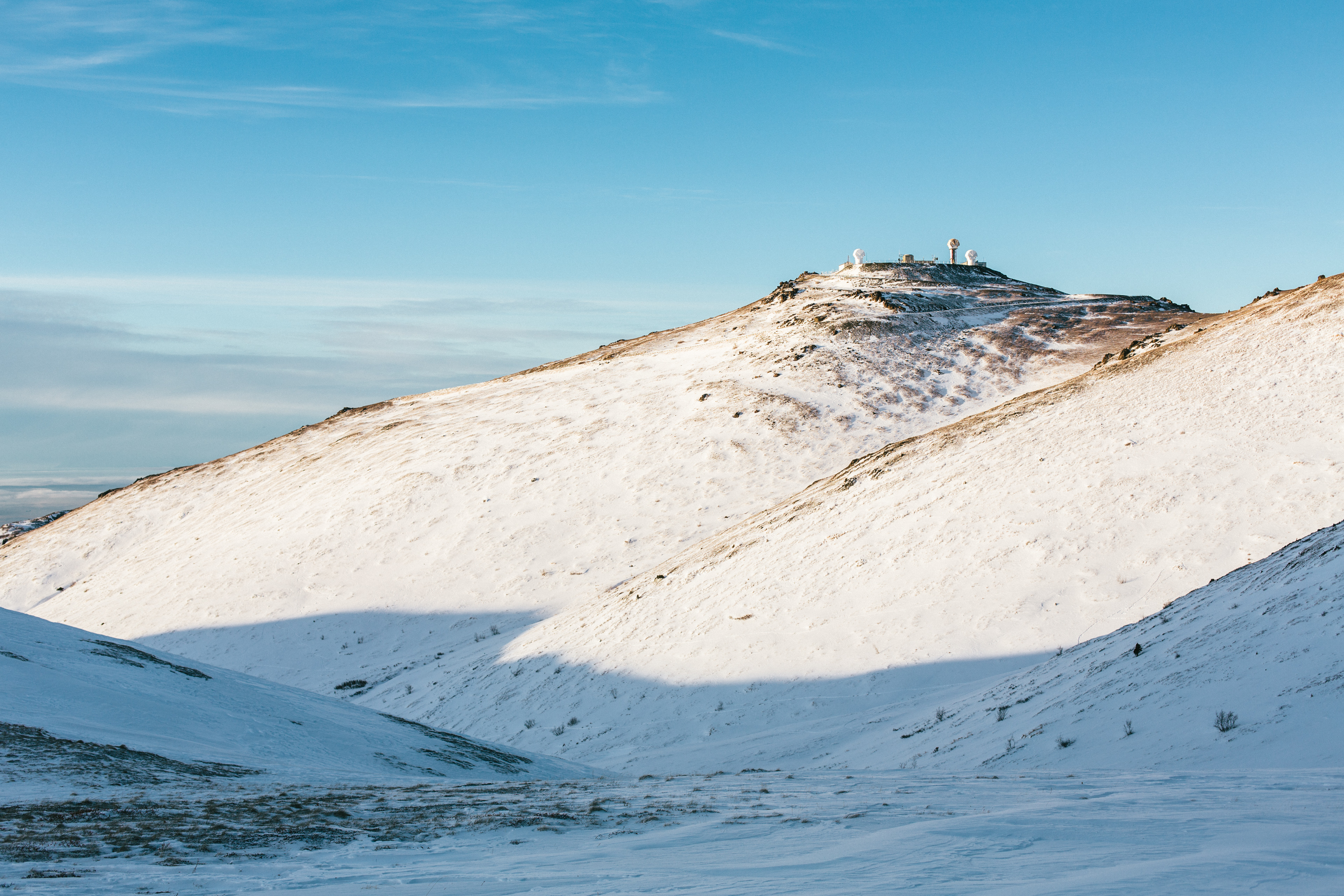
Views of Site Summit in Arctic Valley in different seasons

== See also ==
- National Register of Historic Places listings in Anchorage, Alaska
