= Anchorage Hotel =

- Historic Anchorage Hotel Annex
- U.S. National Register of Historic Places
- Alaska Heritage Resources Survey
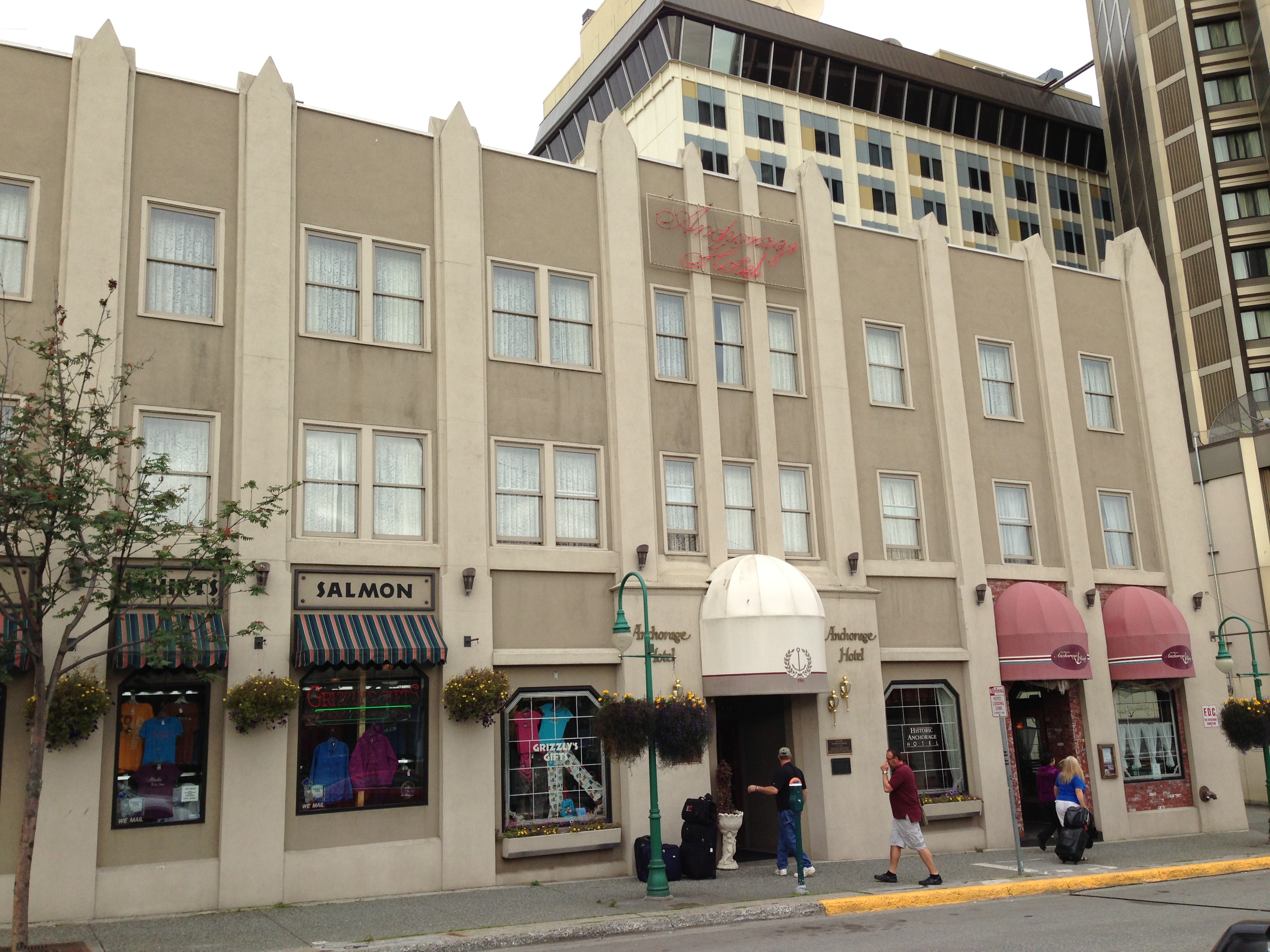

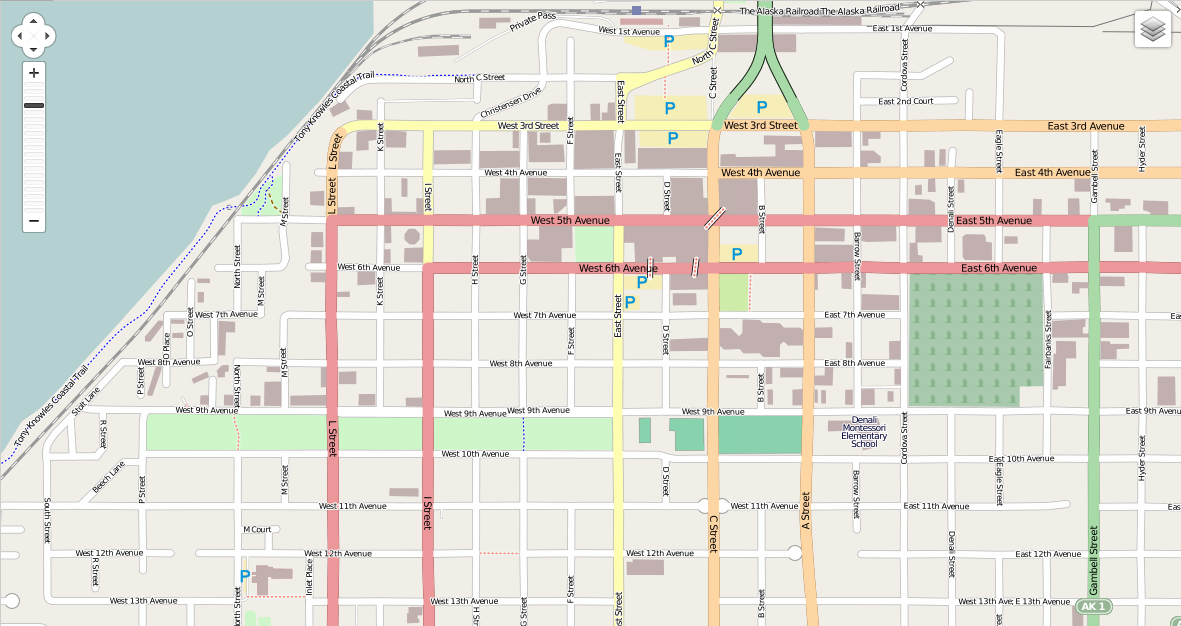
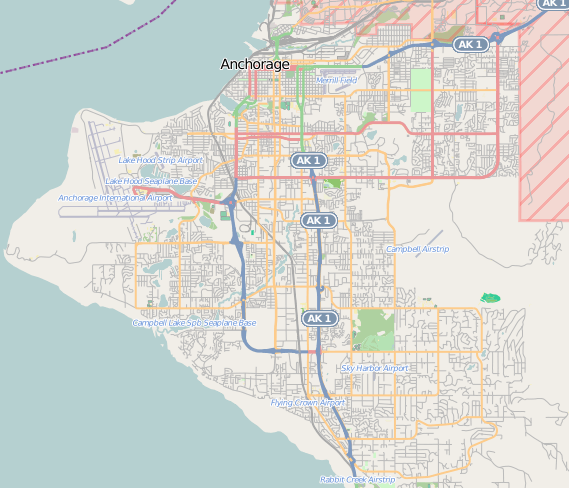
- Location within Downtown Anchorage Location within Anchorage Location within Alaska
- Location: 330 E Street, Anchorage, Alaska
- Coordinates: 61°13′8″N 149°53′30″W
- Area: less than one acre
- Built: 1936
- Architect: E. Ellsworth Sedille
- NRHP reference No.: 99000443
- AHRS No.: ANC-408
- Added to NRHP: April 15, 1999

The Historic Anchorage Hotel is a hotel located at 330 E Street in Anchorage, Alaska, United States. The original Anchorage Hotel building was built in 1916; the current hotel building, which was constructed as an annex to the hotel, opened in 1936. C.B. Wark built the first hotel building; while the building was originally a wood-frame structure, Frank Reed upgraded the building to a luxury hotel in 1917. The hotel outgrew its original building due to Anchorage's growth in the 1930s, so the Anchorage Hotel Annex was built in 1936 to house additional guests. The annex, designed by E. Ellsworth Sedille, had a Gothic design and was one of the tallest buildings in Anchorage at the time. Guests at the hotel included Warren Harding, Harold L. Ickes, Walt Disney, Wiley Post, and Will Rogers; the latter two stayed at the hotel only two days prior to their deaths in a plane crash. In addition, artist Sidney Laurence lived in the hotel for parts of the 1920s and 1930s; Laurence once exchanged a painting of Denali for a year's rent at the hotel.

In the 1950s, the hotel declined in status, and the buildings suffered from a lack of maintenance. The original hotel building was demolished in the 1960s, while the annex became the Hotel Ronald Lee; after a number of ownership changes, Bob and Carolyn Neumann rehabilitated the hotel in the late 1980s. After its renovation, the hotel regained its original name; it now operates as the Historic Anchorage Hotel.

The annex was added to the National Register of Historic Places on April 15, 1999.

== See also ==
- National Register of Historic Places listings in Anchorage, Alaska
