= Temnac P-38G Lightning =

- U.S. National Register of Historic Places
- Alaska Heritage Resources Survey
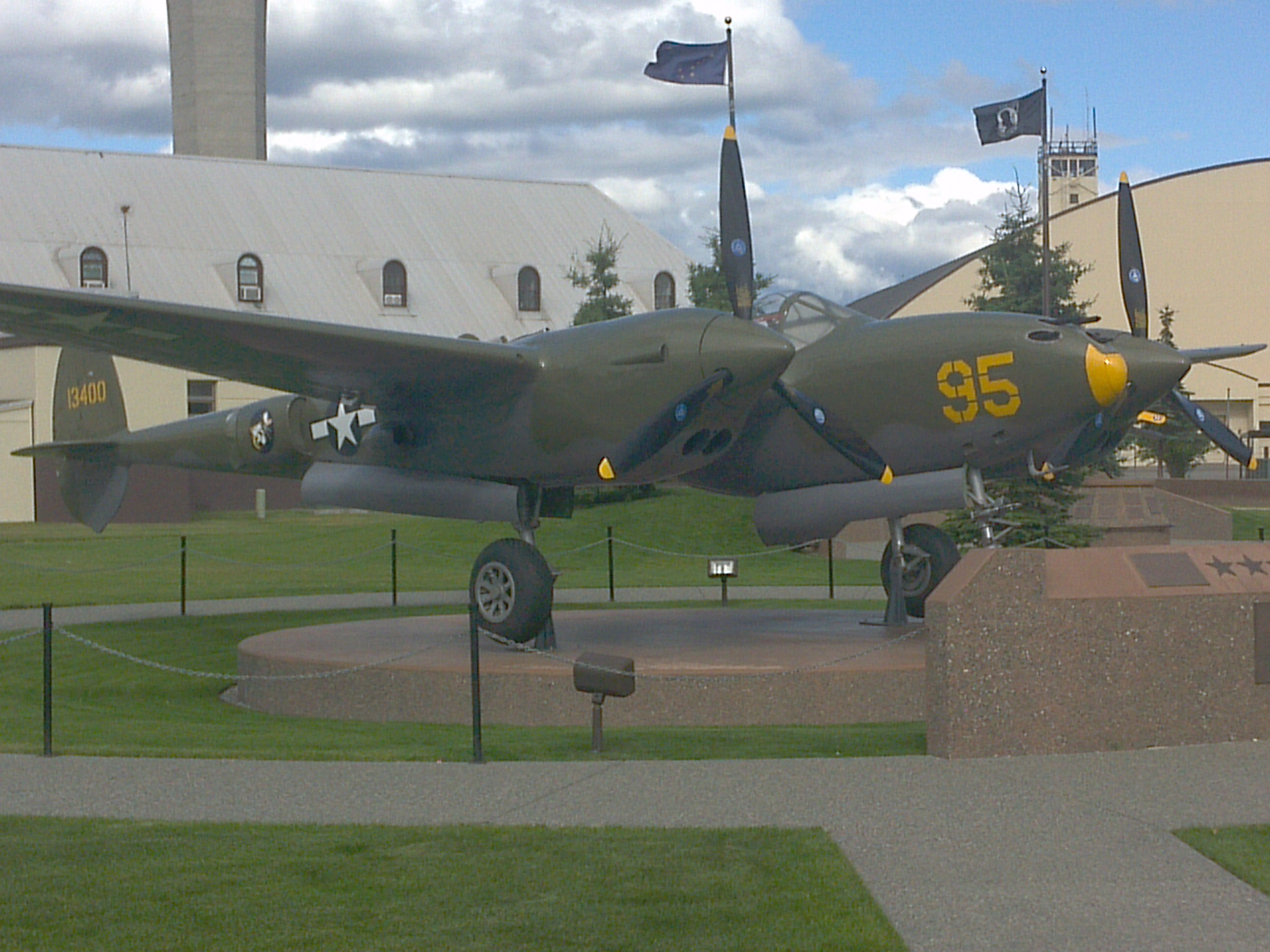

- Location within Alaska
- Location: Joint Base Elmendorf–Richardson
- Coordinates: 61°14′54″N 149°48′7″W
- Area: less than one acre
- Built: 1942
- Built by: Lockheed Aircraft Co.
- NRHP reference No.: 79000406
- AHRS No.: ATU-051
- Added to NRHP: June 26, 1979

The Temnac P-38G Lightning is a historic military aircraft, now on display at Joint Base Elmendorf–Richardson. It is a Lockheed P-38 Lightning, military serial number 42-13400, which entered service in the United States Army Air Forces at what was then known as Elmendorf Field in 1942, during World War II, and was assigned to the 54th Fighter Squadron. In January 1945 it was taken out on a training mission over the western Aleutian Islands by 2nd Lt. Robert Nesmith. While flying low over the Temnac River valley on Attu Island, Nesmith experienced fluctuations in one of the engines, and was forced to put the aircraft down. He crash-landed the aircraft in the valley without injury to himself.

The aircraft was abandoned at the crash site, the Air Force stripping it of salvageable materials. The hulk remained in situ for many years, and was listed on the National Register of Historic Places in 1979. The hulk was recovered in 1999 by Air Force veterans and brought to Elmendorf AFB, where it underwent restoration to correct the ravages of weather and damage done by the original salvage operation. It was placed on display at Elmendorf in 2000.

== See also ==
- National Register of Historic Places listings in Anchorage, Alaska
