= Civil Works Residential Dwellings =

Historic houses in Alaska, United States

- U.S. National Register of Historic Places
- Alaska Heritage Resources Survey
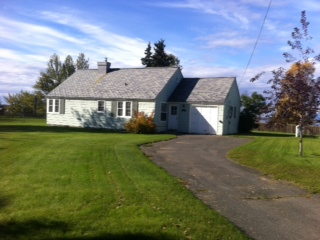
- 786 Delaney Street

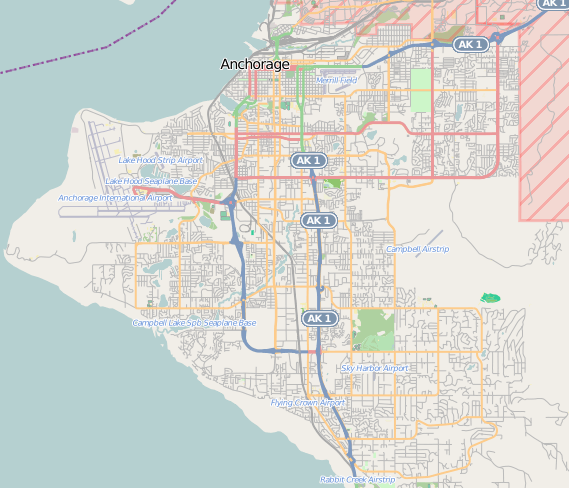
- Location within Anchorage Location within Alaska
- Location: 786 and 800 Delaney Street, Anchorage, Alaska
- Coordinates: 61°13′40″N 149°53′20″W
- Area: less than one acre
- Built: 1941
- Built by: J.B. Warrack Company, U.S. Army Corps of Engineers
- NRHP reference No.: 04000717
- AHRS No.: ANC-00048, ANC-01205

Significant dates
- Added to NRHP: July 21, 2004
- Designated AHRS: March 15, 1979

The Civil Works Residential Dwellings, also known as the Brown's Point Cottages and Corps of Engineers Houses, are a pair of historic houses at 786 and 800 Delaney Street in Anchorage, Alaska. The two houses, mirror images of one another, are single-story wood-frame structures with wide clapboard siding, a metal gable roof, and an attached single-car garage. Built in 1941 to house officers of the United States Army Corps of Engineers, they are among the least-altered of Anchorage's World War II-era military facilities.

The houses were listed on the National Register of Historic Places in 2004.

== See also ==
- National Register of Historic Places listings in Anchorage, Alaska
