= Atwood Campus Center =

Student center of Alaska Pacific University

- Campus Center
- U.S. National Register of Historic Places
- Alaska Heritage Resources Survey
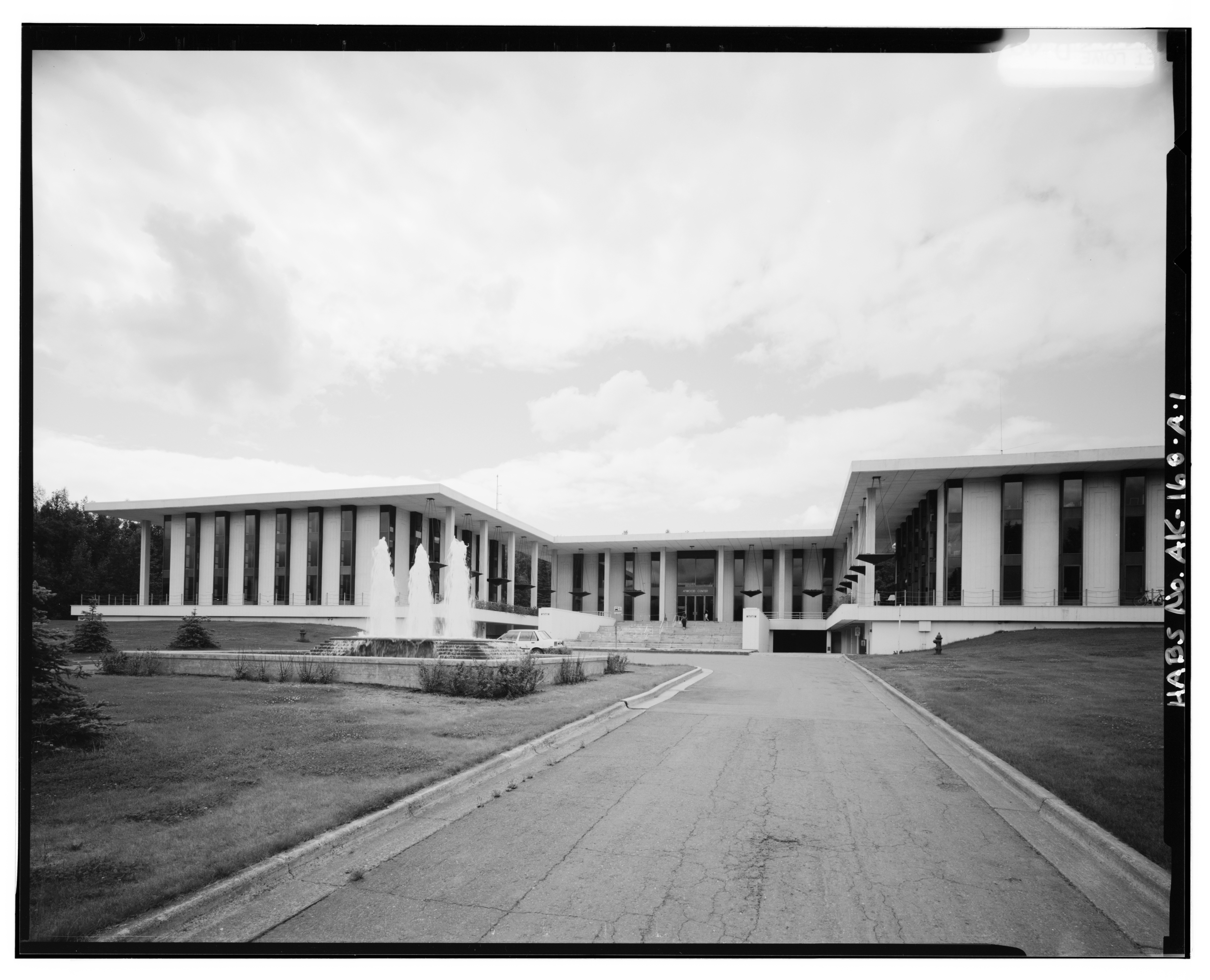
- HABS photo of Atwood Campus Center

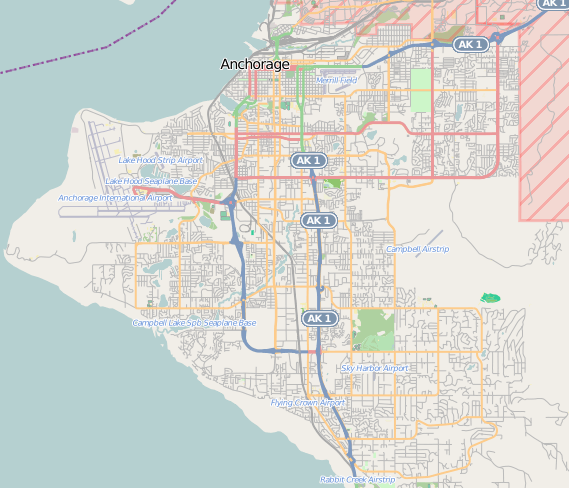
- Location within Anchorage Location within Alaska
- Location: University Drive, Anchorage, Alaska
- Coordinates: 61°11′27″N 149°48′15″W
- Area: 20 acres (8.1 ha)
- Built: 1971
- Architect: Edward Durell Stone
- NRHP reference No.: 79000409
- AHRS No.: ANC-251

Significant dates
- Added to NRHP: June 22, 1979
- Designated AHRS: March 15, 1979

The Atwood Campus Center is the student center of Alaska Pacific University in Anchorage, Alaska. It is a two-story square building 113 feet (34 m) on each side, elevated on a podium extending ten or more feet to each side. It is flanked by two residence halls, which, although also 25 feet (7.6 m) in height, have three stories. This complex was designed by Edward Durell Stone and built in 1966, when the school was known as Alaska Methodist University. This complex has been listed on the National Register of Historic Places for its significance as the site of a major 1971 conference of more than 600 Alaska Native representatives, at which they formally accepted the Alaska Native Claims Settlement Act, landmark legislation which fundamentally altered the handling of land ownership and use in the state, particularly with respect to native title, which had long clouded many real estate transfers.

The center is effectively managed by the student population, providing spaces for meeting and relaxation, as well as a kitchen and dining area, and offices for a variety of student services. The residence halls continue to be used as student housing: the south hall houses incoming freshmen, while the north hall houses upperclass students in suites.

== See also ==
- National Register of Historic Places listings in Anchorage, Alaska
