= Oscar Anderson House Museum =

Historic house in Alaska, United States

- Oscar Anderson House
- U.S. National Register of Historic Places
- Alaska Heritage Resources Survey
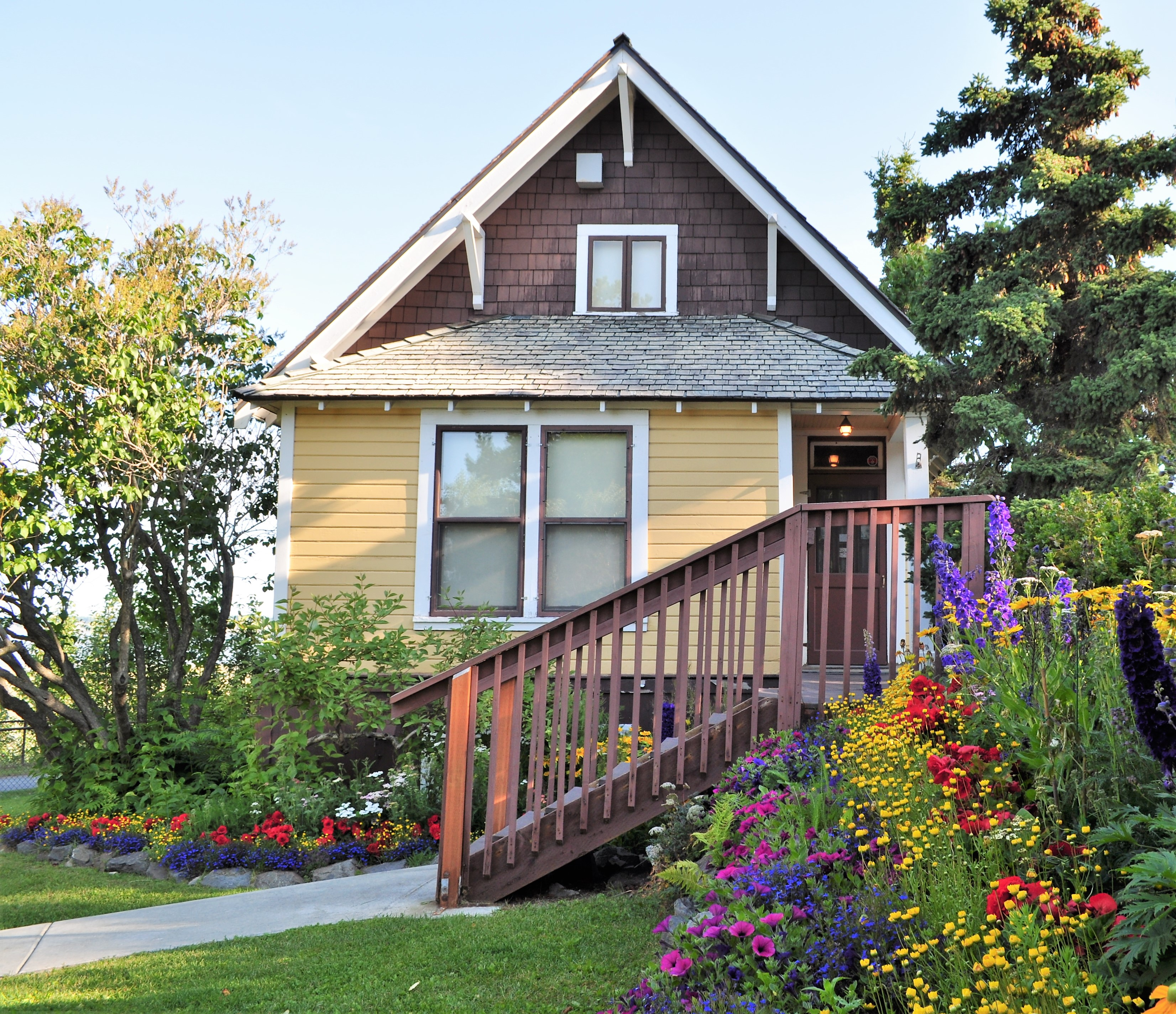

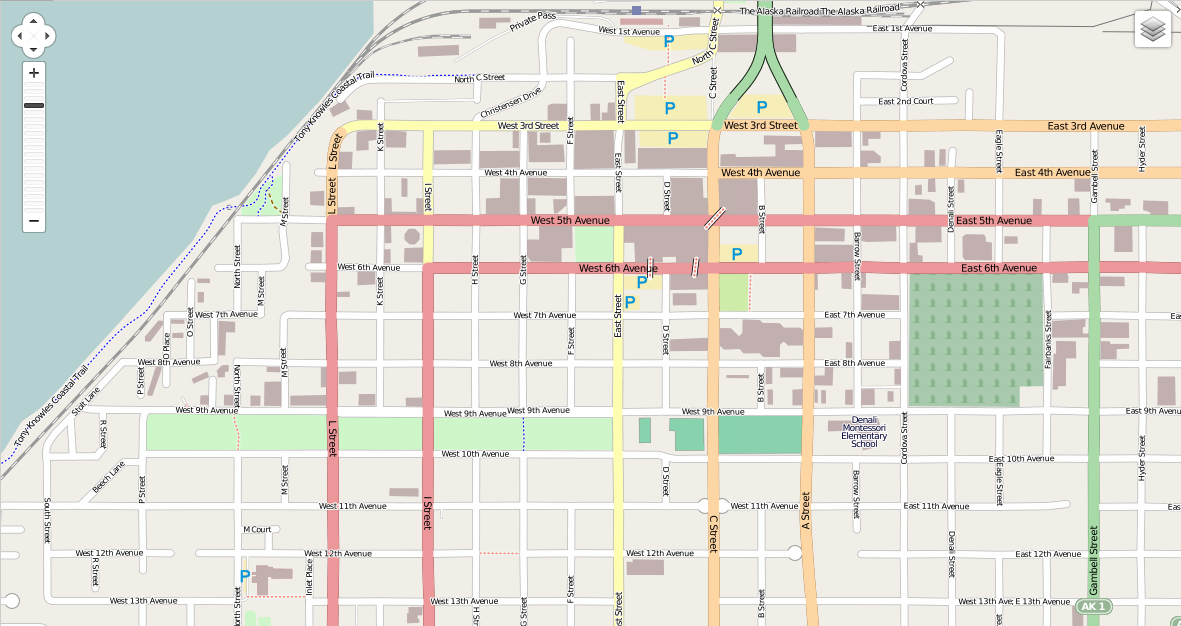
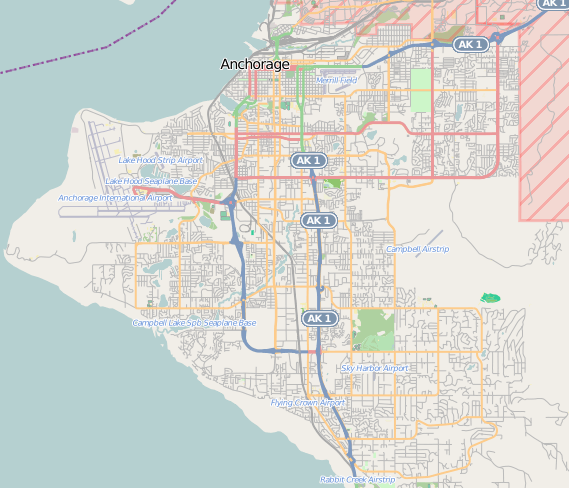
- Location within Downtown Anchorage Location within Anchorage Location within Alaska
- Location: 420 M Street, Anchorage, Alaska
- Coordinates: 61°13′7″N 149°54′22″W
- Area: less than 1 acre
- Built: 1915
- Architect: Multiple
- NRHP reference No.: 78000514
- AHRS No.: ANC-098
- Added to NRHP: June 13, 1978

The Oscar Anderson House Museum is a historical museum in Anchorage, Alaska. Located in Elderberry Park, the structure was built in 1915 by early Anchorage resident Oscar Anderson. Anderson claimed to be the 18th person to set foot on what is now Anchorage. The structure was the first wood-frame house in Anchorage, and was occupied by Anderson until his death in 1974. The house was completely restored to a 1915 appearance between 1978 and 1982, and is now open as a historic house museum.

It was listed on the National Register of Historic Places in 1978.

== See also ==
- National Register of Historic Places listings in Anchorage, Alaska
