= Russian Bishop's House =

- U.S. National Register of Historic Places
- U.S. National Historic Landmark
- U.S. Historic district – Contributing property
- Alaska Heritage Resources Survey
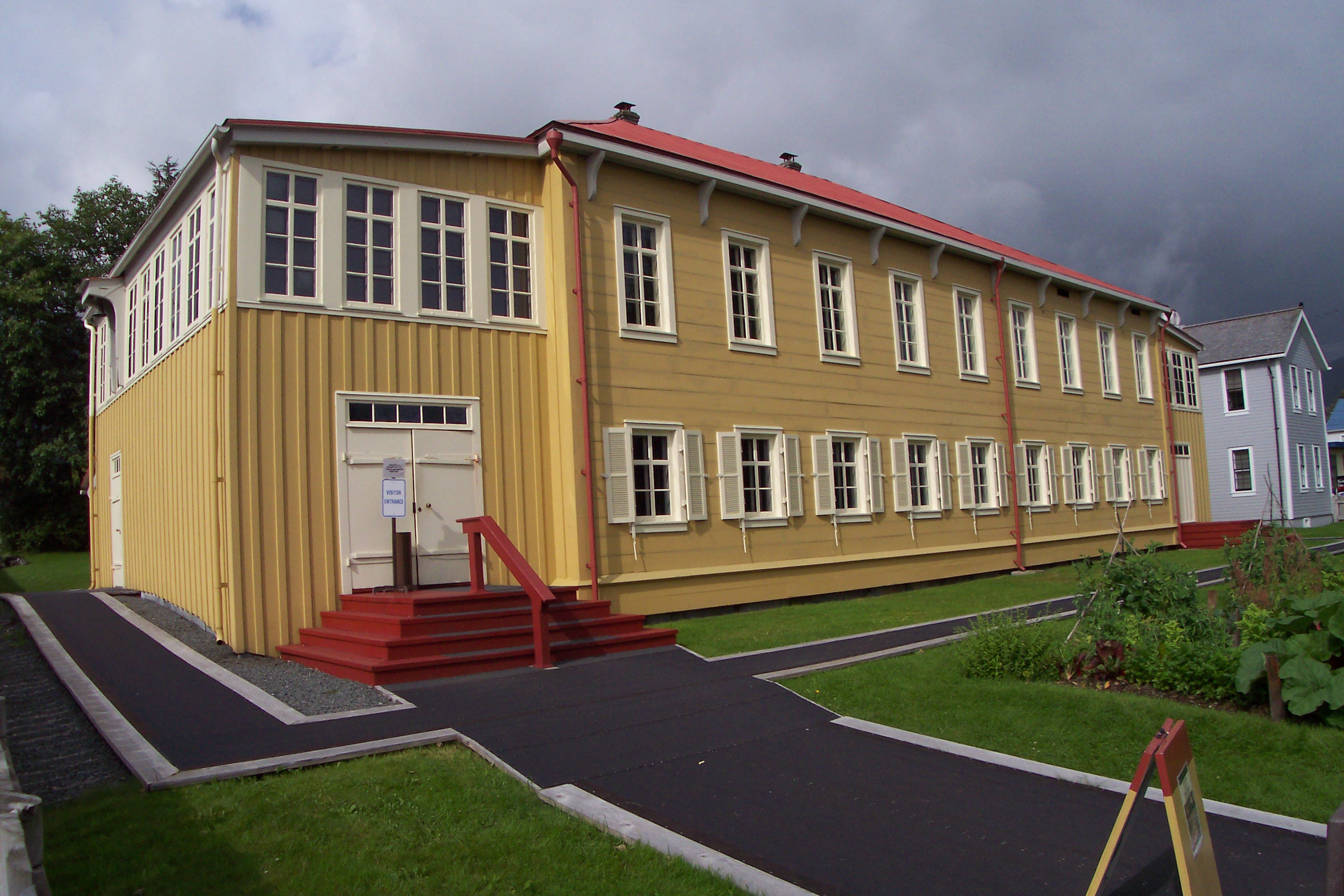

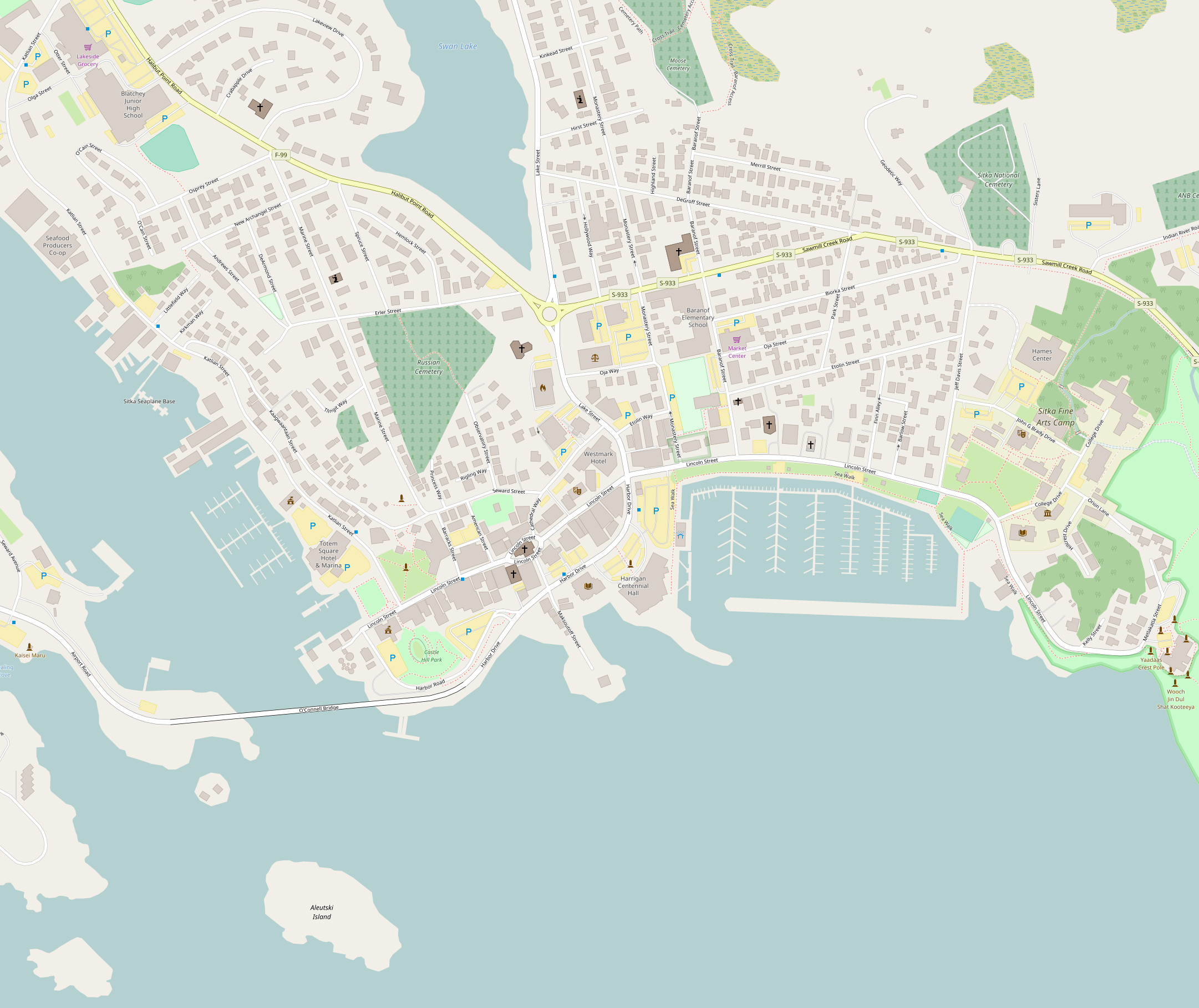
- Location within Downtown Sitka Location within Alaska
- Location: 501 Lincoln Street, Sitka, Alaska
- Coordinates: 57°03′05″N 135°19′52″W
- Area: 0.5 acres (0.20 ha)
- Built: 1843
- Part of: Sitka National Historical Park (ID66000164)
- MPS: Russian Orthodox Church Buildings and Sites TR (AD)
- NRHP reference No.: 66000025
- AHRS No.: SIT-009

Significant dates
- Added to NRHP: October 15, 1966
- Designated NHL: June 13, 1962
- Designated CP: October 15, 1966

The Russian Bishop's House (Russian: Русский Архиерейский Дом), once the Russian Mission Orphanage (Russian: Российская Миссия Орфанадж), is a historic house museum and National Historic Landmark at Lincoln and Monastery Streets in Sitka, Alaska. Built in 1841–43, this log structure is one of the oldest surviving buildings of Russian America, and was one of the centerpieces of the Russian Orthodox church's efforts to spread its influence among the natives of Alaska. It was the home and administrative center of Ivan Veniaminov, the first Bishop of Alaska, later canonized as Innocent of Alaska. The house is now a unit of Sitka National Historical Park, and is administered by the National Park Service.

== Description ==
The Russian Bishop's House is a two-story log structure, measuring about 42 by 63 feet (13 m × 19 m). It is divided into nine bays, each measuring about 7 feet (2.1 m) (one sazhen) square, and covered by a hip roof. The east and west ends of the building are further extended by shed-roof "galleries" that are 14 feet (4.3 m) wide, which historically provided space for stairwells, storage, latrines, and entrances.

The exterior has undergone a number of alterations since construction. The south facade was sheathed in clapboarding c. 1851, and the galleries were roofed in metal around that time. In 1887 the galleries were sheathed in board-and-batten siding. The interior was repeatedly altered over the decades, and underwent a major restoration once the property was acquired by the National Park Service 1973.

=== Secondary buildings ===
The property on which the Bishop's House stands includes two secondary buildings associated with the activities of the Russian Orthodox Church. East of the main house stands the Old School, a two-story wood-frame structure built in 1897 to provide a kindergarten and girls' school. House 105 is a 1 1/2-story wood-frame structure which stands facing Monastery Street. It was originally on a separate parcel of land, and was apparently moved to its present location in the 1950s.

== History ==
The Russian Bishop's House was built between 1841 and 1843 by Finnish laborers brought in by the Russian American Company, to provide housing for Reverend Ivan Veniaminov, who had been appointed the first Bishop of Alaska by the Russian Orthodox Church. From his seat in Sitka, Veniaminov oversaw the spread of Orthodox missionary and educational work to the indigenous peoples of southern Alaska, nearly doubling the number of Orthodox worshippers in the region between 1841 and 1860. Missionary efforts were continued after the United States purchased Alaska in 1867 and were only significantly cut back after funding cuts in the wake of the Russian Revolution in 1917. The seat of the Russian diocese was relocated to San Francisco in 1872, and the Bishop's House was repurposed to provide housing quarters for priests. Its first floor also served as an inn for a time.

In 1903 a bishop was once again assigned to a district with its seat at Sitka. For most of the 20th century, the upper floors housed a chapel and the quarters of the bishop, while the ground floor was used in a variety of ways. In the 1920s it housed a printing operation that produced, in addition to church publications, the Sitka Sun and the Sitka Tribune.

The Old School was used as a church school building until 1922, and as a public school thereafter. House 105, while not of architectural note, was used as a church rental property for many years, and is one of the oldest buildings in Sitka.

The property was designated a National Historic Landmark in 1962, and was listed on the National Register of Historic Places as the "Russian Mission Orphanage" in 1966, reflecting its major function at that time. The National Register designation was altered to "Russian Bishop's House" in 1980.

The Russian Bishop's House is now owned and managed by the National Park Service as a unit of Sitka National Historical Park. It is open to the public on ranger-guided tours.

== See also ==
- List of National Historic Landmarks in Alaska
- List of the oldest buildings in Alaska
- National Register of Historic Places listings in Sitka City and Borough, Alaska
