= Oscar Gill House =

Historic house in Alaska, United States

- U.S. National Register of Historic Places
- Alaska Heritage Resources Survey
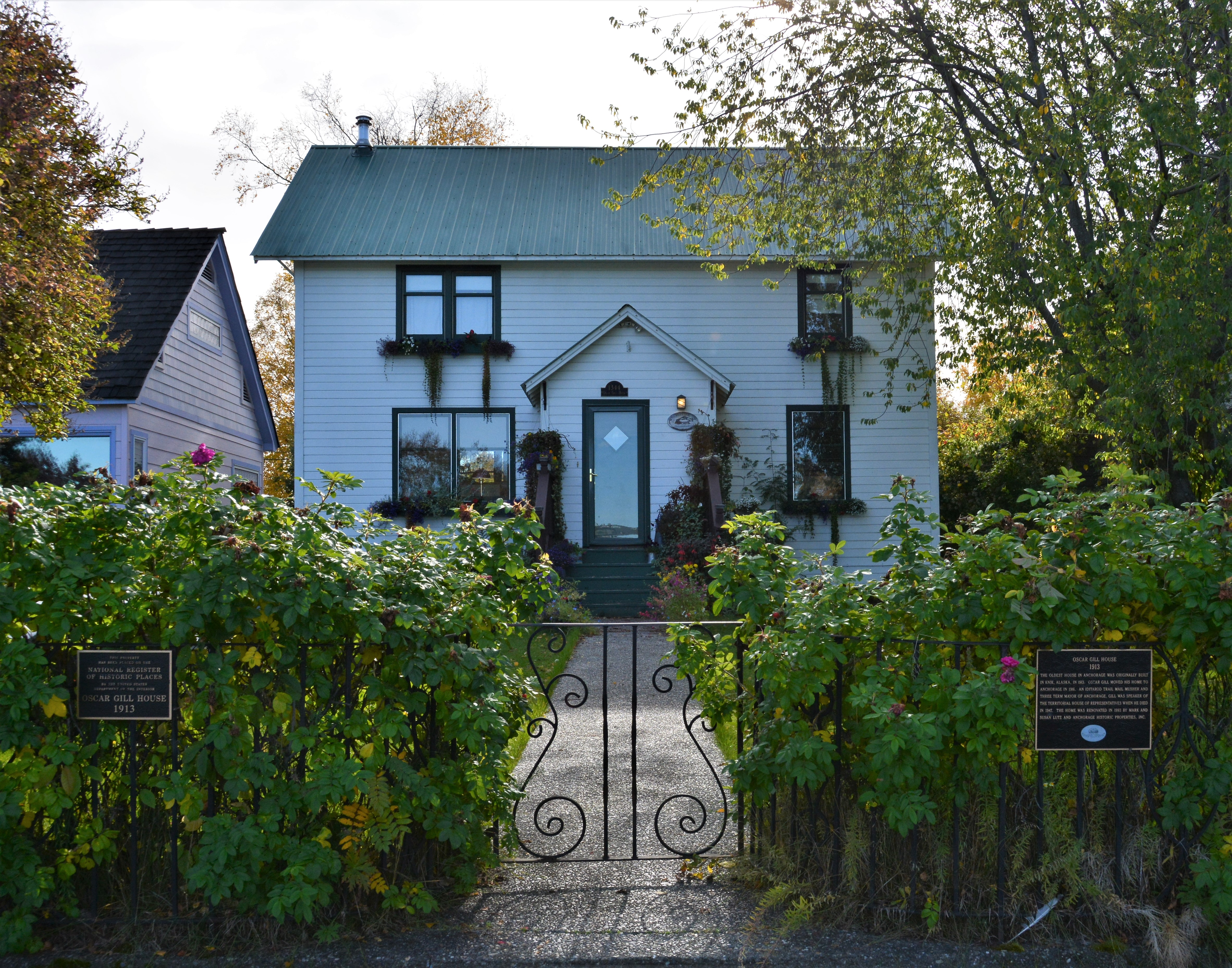

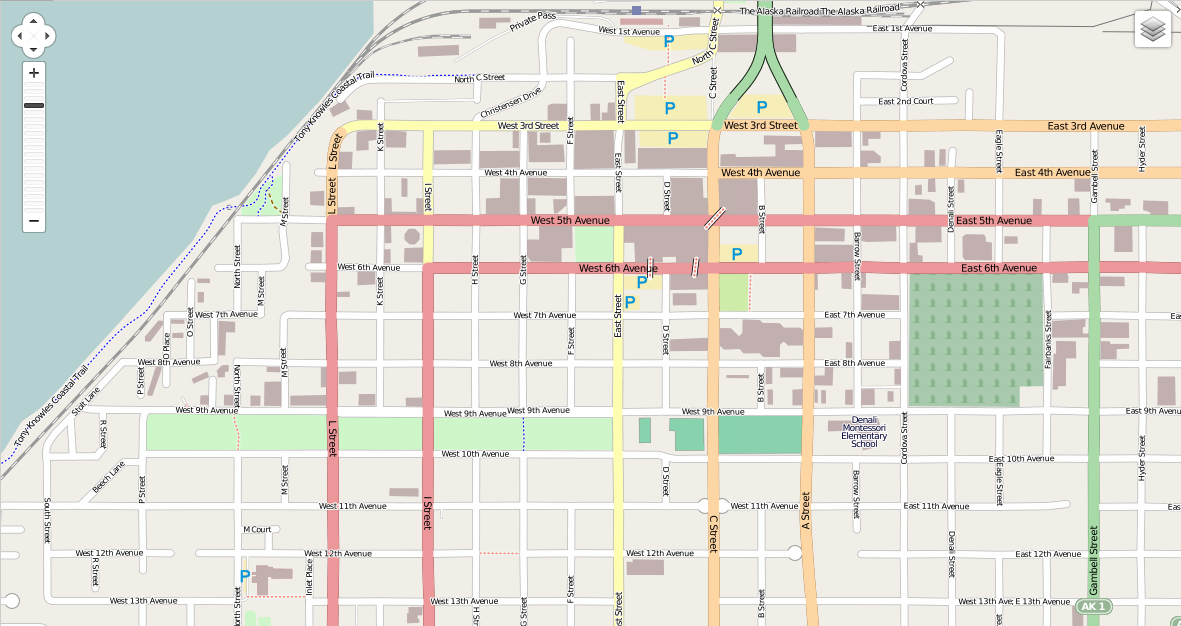
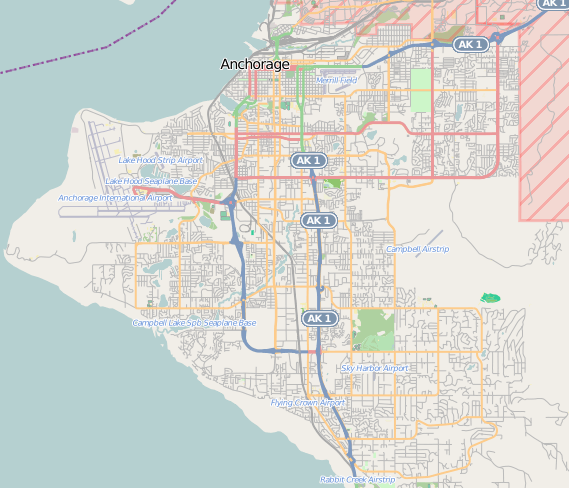
- Location within Downtown Anchorage Location within Anchorage Location within Alaska
- Location: 1344 West 10th Avenue, Anchorage, Alaska
- Coordinates: 61°12′45″N 149°54′34″W
- Area: less than one acre
- Built by: Oscar Stephen Gill
- Architectural style: Bungalow/craftsman
- NRHP reference No.: 01000022
- AHRS No.: ANC-00412
- Added to NRHP: February 2, 2001

The Oscar Gill House is a historic house at 1344 West Tenth Avenue in the South Addition neighborhood of Anchorage, Alaska. It is one of Anchorage's oldest buildings. It is a two-story wood-frame structure, three bays wide, with a side gable roof. The bays are asymmetrically arranged, with a single-window bay on the right and a double-window bay on the left. The center bay is taken up by a projecting gable-roofed vestibule, in which the door is slightly off-center. The house's modest Craftsman style includes extended eaves with exposed rafter ends, and it has retained original interior flooring and woodwork. The house was built in 1913 by Oscar Gill in the (now ghost) town of Knik at the head of Knik Arm. When Anchorage was established in 1916, Gill had the house barged across the inlet, and it stood at 918 West Tenth Avenue for many decades. The house was removed from that site in 1982 to accommodate expansion of the Anchorage Pioneer Home, one of many historic houses throughout downtown Anchorage which fell victim to a real estate and building boom that intensified in 1982 and 1983. Unlike other similar structures, most of which spent years in storage on municipally owned land but were eventually demolished, this house was spared. It sat on a vacant lot on P Street, across from the western end of the Delaney Park Strip, for approximately a decade and a half before being moved to its present location. The house has been operated as a bed and breakfast establishment since that time.

The house was listed on the National Register of Historic Places in 2001.

== See also ==
- National Register of Historic Places listings in Anchorage, Alaska
