= Greater Friendship Baptist Church =

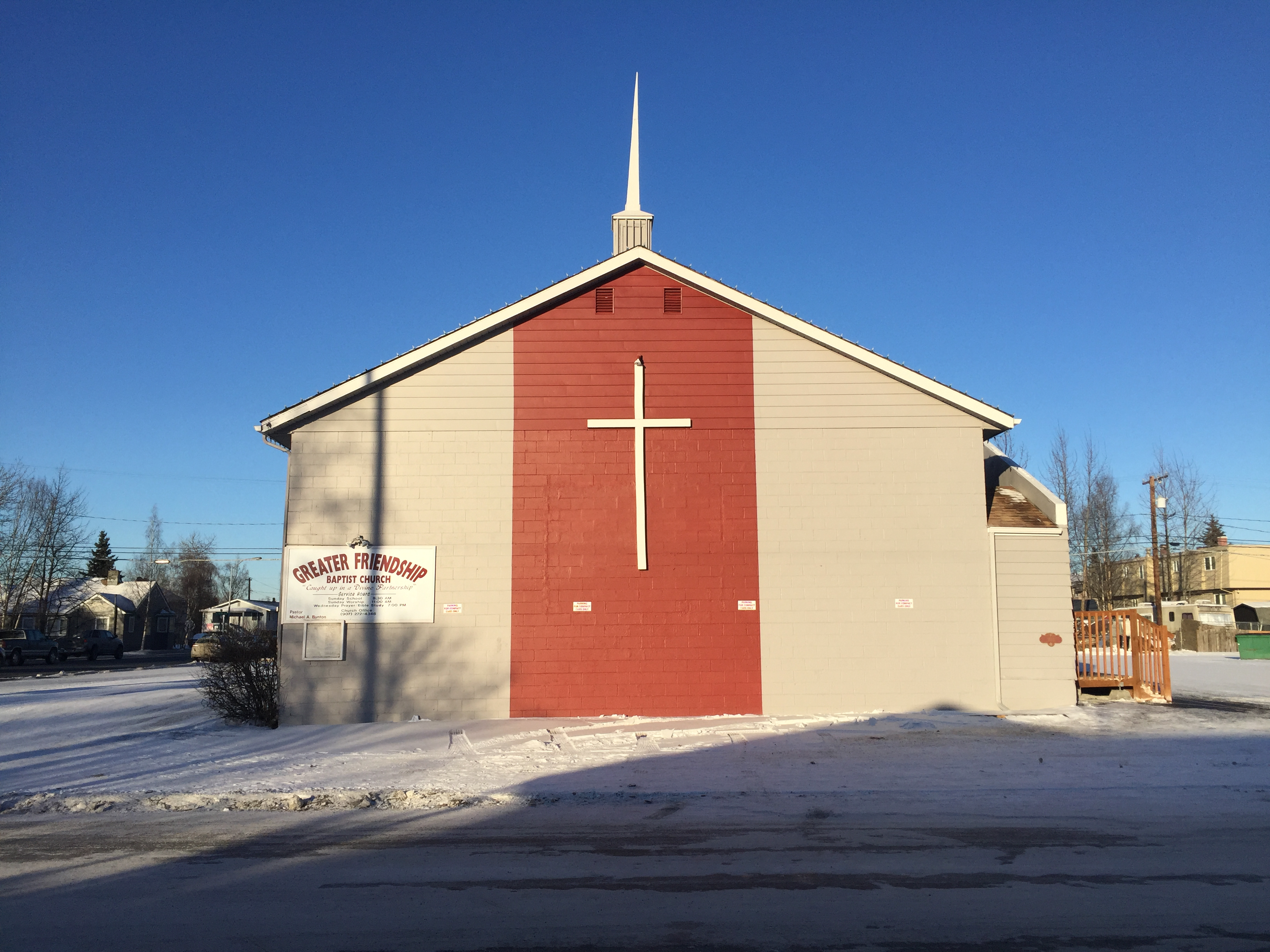
- Greater Friendship Baptist Church
- 61.2099°N 149.8665°W
- Location: 903 E. 13th Avenue Anchorage, AK 99501
- Country: United States
- Denomination: Baptist
- Website: greaterfriendshipbaptist.org

History
- Founded: 1951
- Founder: Rev. Charles Kennedy

Clergy
- Pastor: Rev. Michael A. Bunton

Greater Friendship Baptist Church is a Baptist church in Anchorage, Alaska. It is affiliated with the Southern Baptist Convention. The church property was listed on the National Register of Historic Places in 2019.

== History ==
Greater Friendship began with a revival led by the Rev. Charles Kennedy in 1951. The congregation was dedicated as Greater Friendship Baptist Church on June 22, 1951. The original congregation of 32 believers grew to more than a hundred within a few weeks. After months of services at First Baptist Church of Anchorage, AK, the congregation moved services to Pioneer Hall on 6th Avenue and F Street. From there, the congregation moved to 12th Avenue and Cordova Street in 1952. That same year, the church purchased the current church site at 13th Avenue and Ingra Street. Members built a church on the site, meeting in the concrete basement while the structure above was completed. In October 1952, Rev. Kennedy, the founding pastor, dedicated the first, wooden church building. That original church structure burned in 1953. The new and current building opened in 1955 and was partially constructed from materials recovered from First Baptist, which also burned down in 1953.

Greater Friendship was the first African-American church established in Alaska. Greater Friendship also was the first modern African-American church to affiliate with the Southern Baptist Convention (SBC). The inclusion and acceptance of Greater Friendship marked a shift in SBC policies, which had for decades excluded minorities and promoted white superiority. Additional African-American churches followed Greater Friendship in affiliating with the SBC. First, Community Baptist of Santa Rosa, CA joined the SBC shortly after Greater Friendship, and two more black churches in Austin, TX joined in 1954. In 1965, Greater Friendship pastor Rev. Leo Josey, Jr. became the first African-American pastor to represent Southern Baptists at a state level when he was unanimously elected second vice-president of that year's Alaska Baptist Convention.

The original church mortgage was paid off in 1974, and the congregation celebrated with a mortgage burning. From late 1976 through late 1977, the church building was significantly remodeled. The entrance was moved from the south wall to its current location at the southeast corner. Rev. Charlie Dargan rededicated the church on October 2, 1977.
