= Wendler Building =

- U.S. National Register of Historic Places
- Alaska Heritage Resources Survey
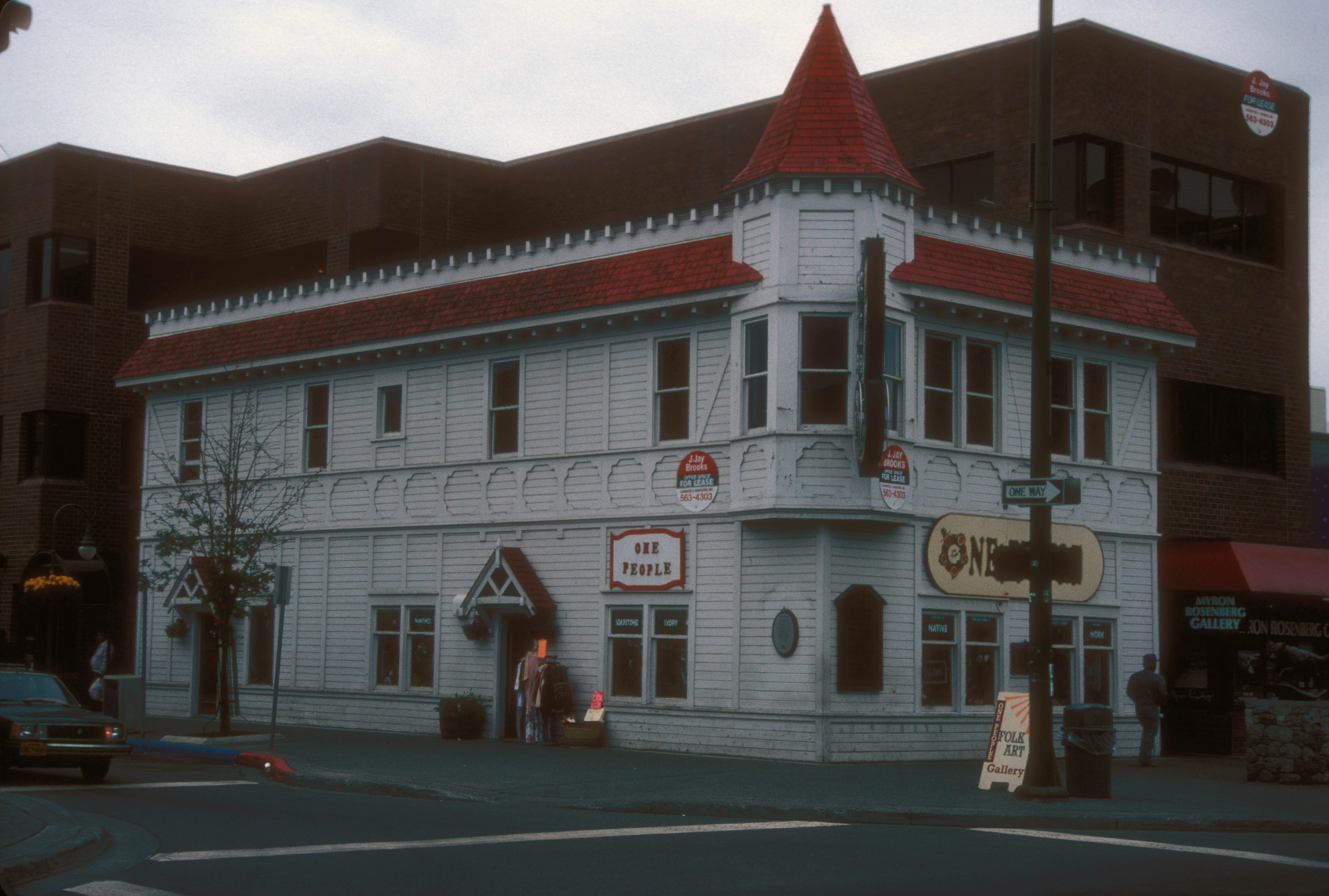

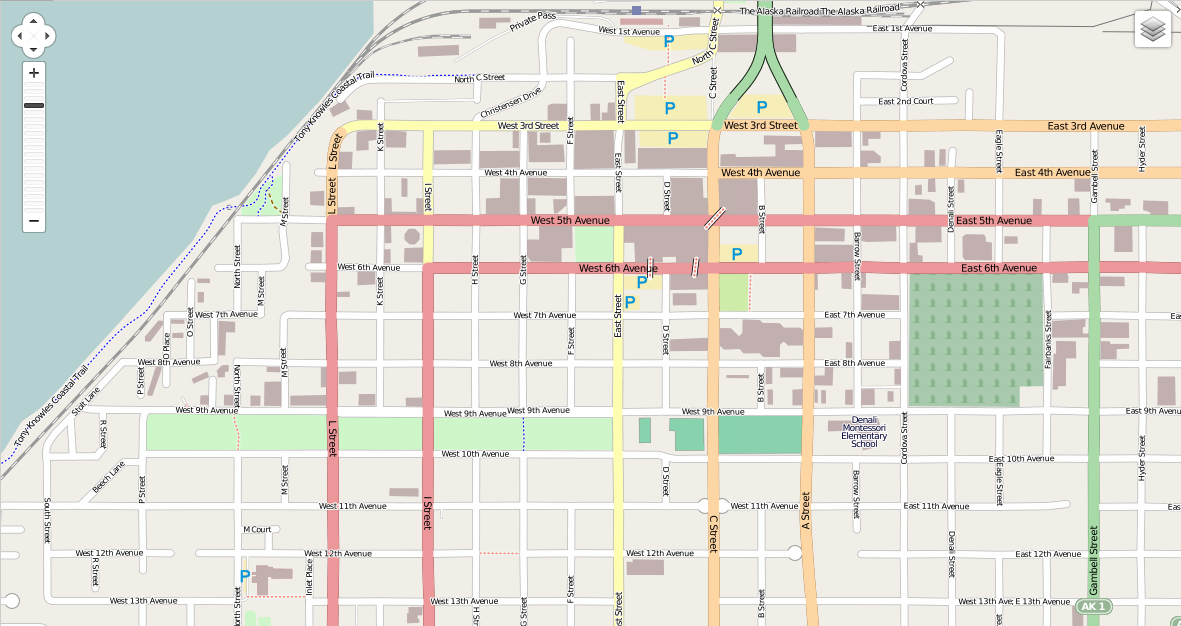
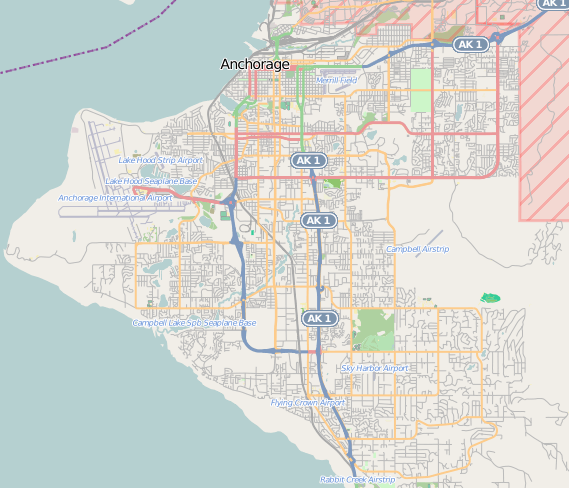
- Location within Downtown Anchorage Location within Anchorage Location within Alaska
- Location: 400 D Street, Anchorage, Alaska
- Coordinates: 61°13′6″N 149°53′23″W
- Area: 0.2 acres (0.081 ha)
- Built: 1915
- NRHP reference No.: 88000730
- AHRS No.: ANC-130
- Added to NRHP: June 24, 1988

The Wendler Building is a historic commercial building at 400 D Street in Anchorage, Alaska. Built in 1915 by Tony and Florence Wendler, it is the oldest commercial building in the city. The building was listed on the National Register of Historic Places in 1988.

== History ==
Originally located at 4th and I Streets, it was moved to its present location in 1984. It was used by the Wendlers as a store until 1920, after which Florence Wendler converted it to a boarding house. In 1948, she and her daughters opened Club 25, an exclusive private club for women. It was eventually opened to general membership, and was for many years a landmark of the city's social scene.

== See also ==
- National Register of Historic Places listings in Anchorage, Alaska
