= The Wireless Station =

- U.S. National Register of Historic Places
- Alaska Heritage Resources Survey
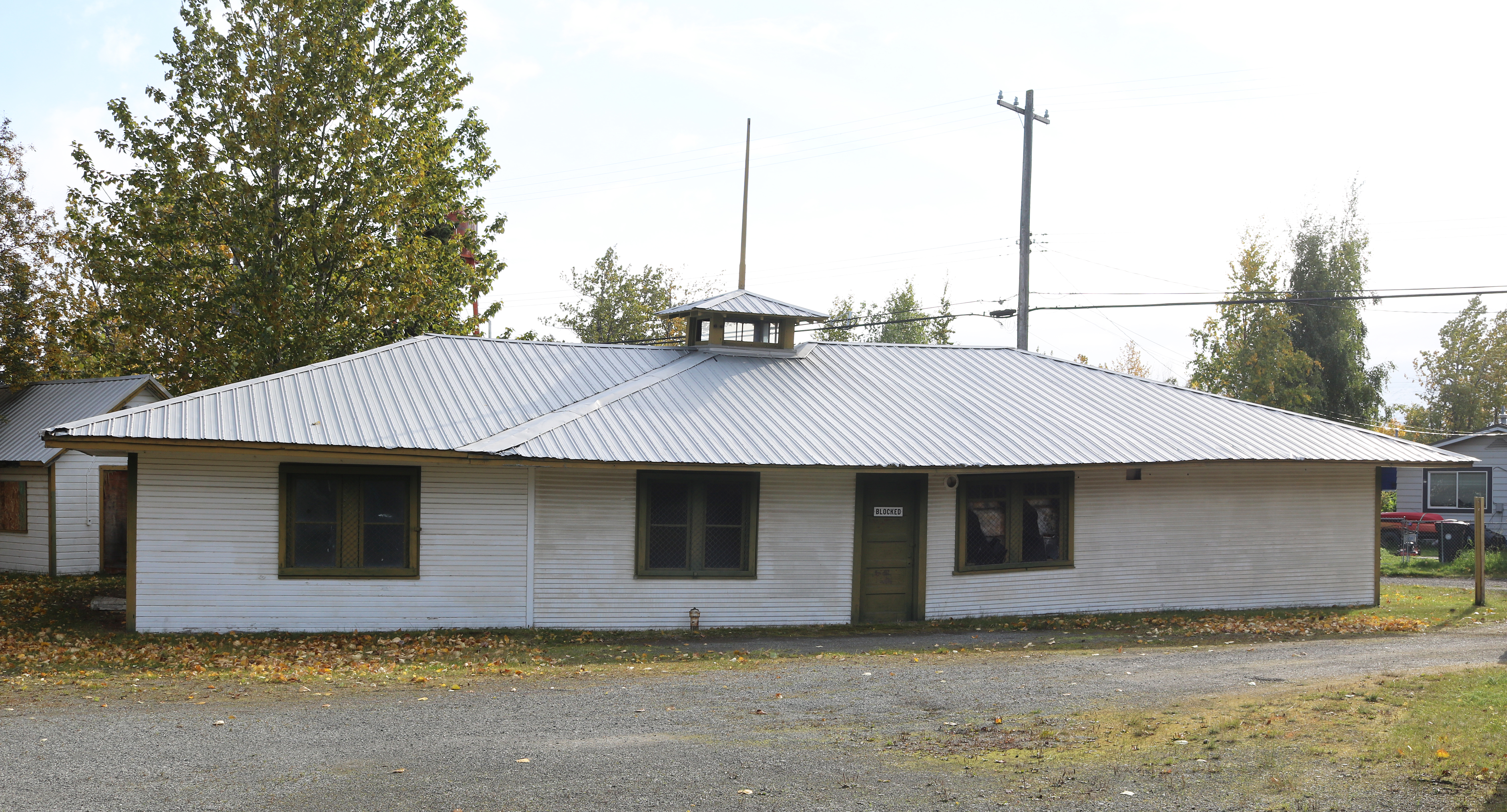
- Building A, the original building, in 2021

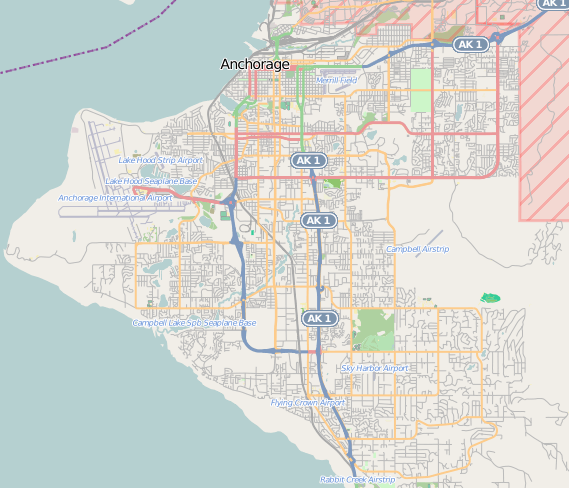
- Location within Anchorage Location within Alaska
- Location: 124, 132 and 140 East Manor Avenue, Anchorage, Alaska
- Coordinates: 61°13′45″N 149°52′53″W
- Area: 2.1 acres (0.85 ha)
- Built: 1917
- NRHP reference No.: 15000843
- AHRS No.: ANC-00306
- Added to NRHP: December 1, 2015

The Wireless Station is a historic US government telecommunications facility at East Manor and Boyd Streets in Anchorage, Alaska. The property includes three buildings (built in 1917, 1934, and 1949) that were used to maintain radio communications in the Anchorage area, with ships at sea, and as a communications link to Seattle, Washington as part of military WAMCATS telecommunications system. In addition, the station was used for communications during the construction of the Alaska Railroad, and, during the 1925 serum run to Nome, it was used to inform the residents of Nome that the diphtheria antitoxin was on its way.

== Design ==
The three buildings are single-story frame structures with clapboard siding. The original 1917 building has a cupola, that when illuminated, originally served as a beacon for ships seeking to reach the Anchorage port. The station saw active service until the early 1950s and has stood vacant since the 1990s.

The station complex was listed on the US National Register of Historic Places in 2015.

== See also ==
- National Register of Historic Places listings in Anchorage, Alaska
