= Old St. Nicholas Russian Orthodox Church =

Historic church in Alaska, United States

- U.S. National Register of Historic Places
- Alaska Heritage Resources Survey
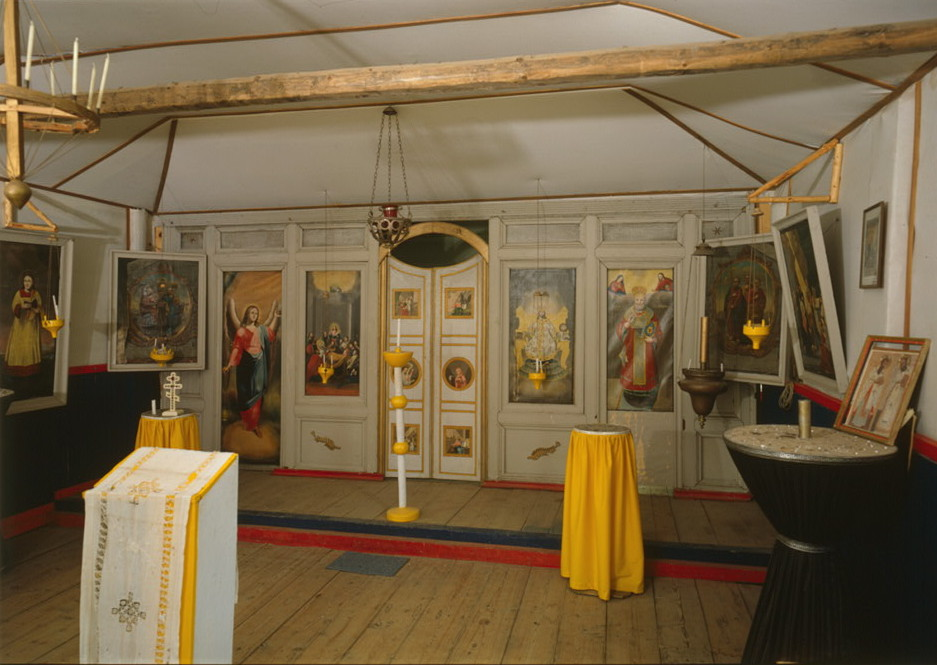
- Interior of the Old St. Nicholas Russian Orthodox Church in Eklutna

- Location within Alaska
- Location: Eklutna Village Road, Eklutna, Alaska
- Coordinates: 61°27′38″N 149°21′42″W
- Area: 1.6 acres (0.65 ha)
- Built: 1894
- Website: http://stnicholasjuneau.org/history.html
- MPS: Russian Orthodox Church Buildings and Sites TR (AD)
- NRHP reference No.: 72000189
- AHRS No.: ANC-004
- Added to NRHP: March 24, 1972

Old St. Nicholas Russian Orthodox Church, also known as the Eklutna Chapel, is a historic Russian Orthodox church in Eklutna, Alaska. It is about one mile inland from the Knik Arm of the Cook Inlet.

The church, built of hewn spruce logs, is about 5 by 8 metres (16 ft × 26 ft) in plan, and was built in about 1894. It was moved to its current location in 1900.

A new church was built next to the old in 1962. It was added to the National Register of Historic Places in 1972. This and other Russian Orthodox churches of the Alaskan Diocese were studied during the National Register of Historic Places inventory and Historic American Buildings Survey.

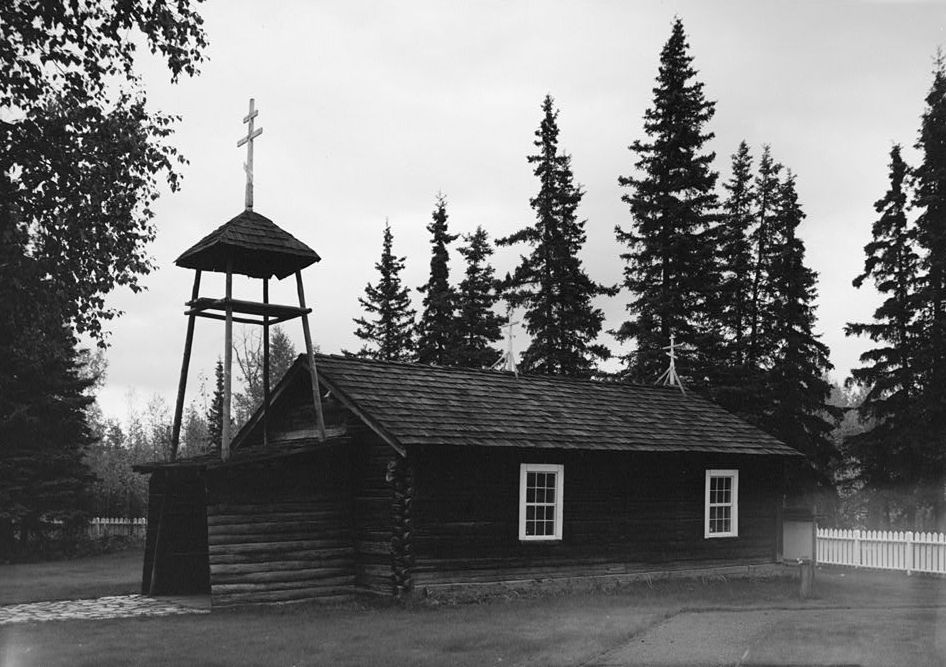
Old St. Nicholas Russian Orthodox Church (1870s) at Eklutna

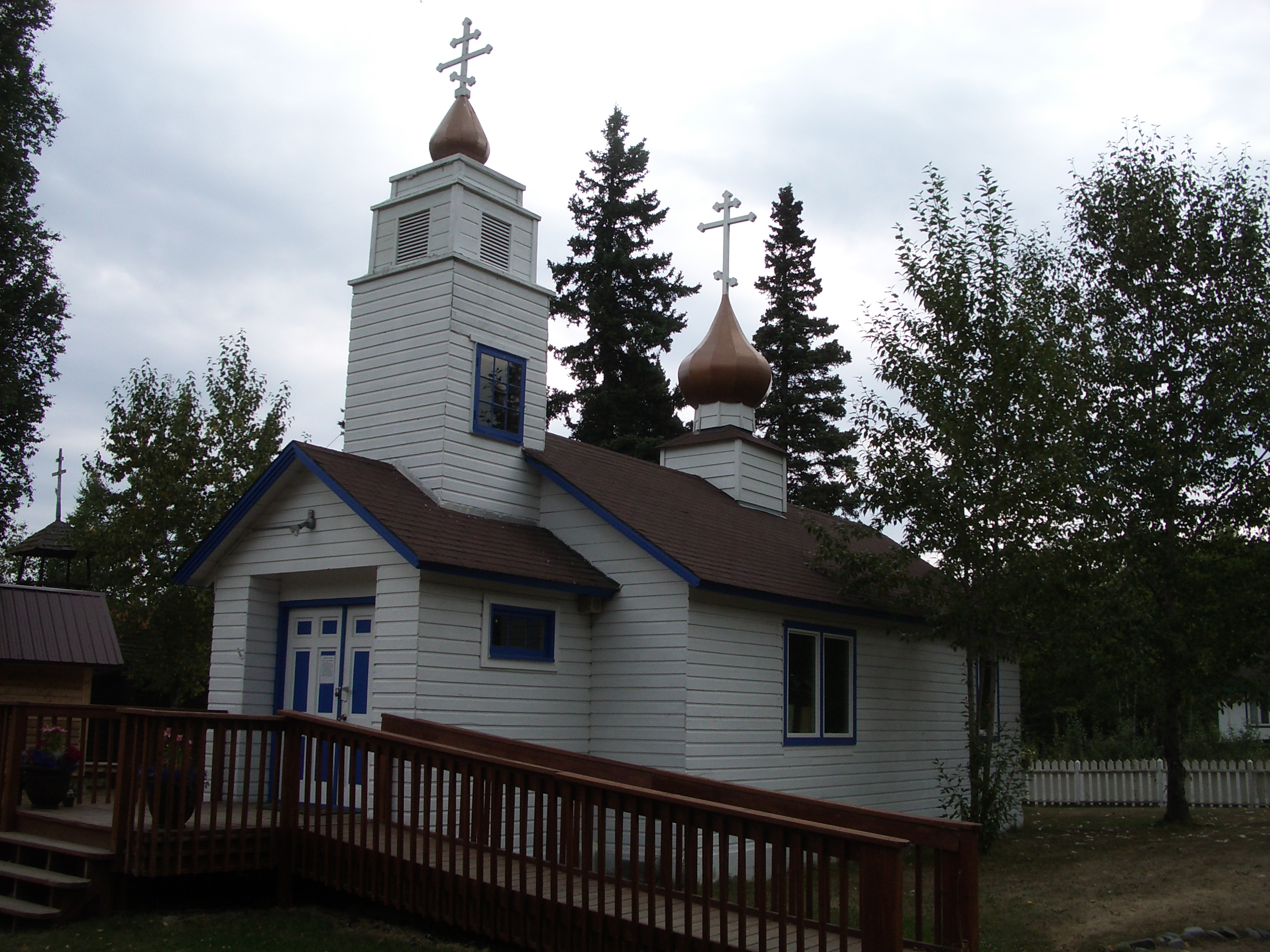
New St. Nicholas Russian Orthodox Church (1962) at Eklutna, in 2009

== See also ==
- National Register of Historic Places listings in Anchorage, Alaska
