= Eklutna, Anchorage =

Native village in Alaska, US

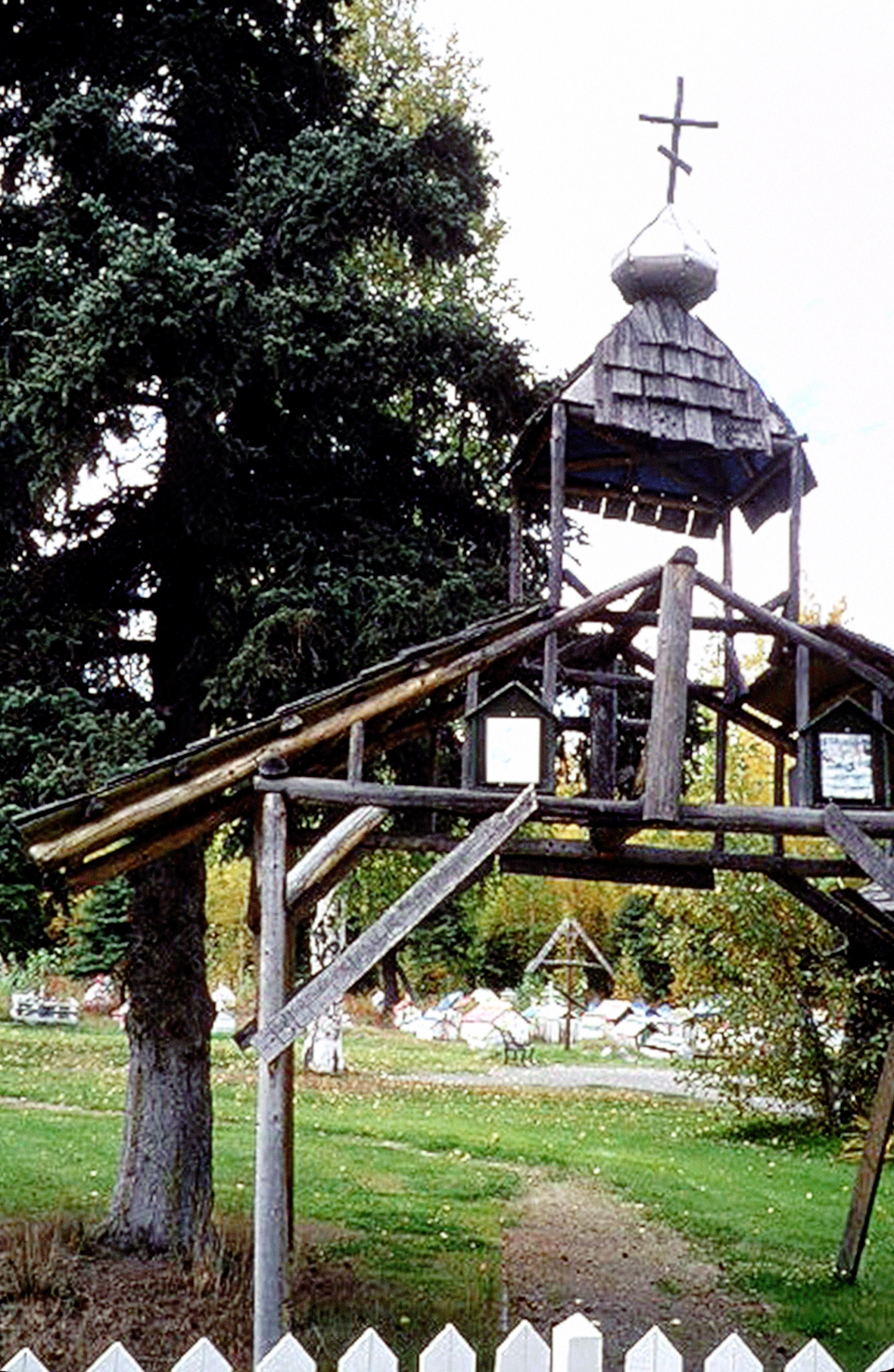
The Russian Orthodox Eklutna Cemetery

Eklutna (/ɛˈkluːtnə/; Denaʼina: Idlughet, Russian: Эклутна) is a native village within Anchorage, Alaska. The Tribal Council estimates the population at 70; many tribal members live in the surrounding communities.

== About ==
Eklutna lies 24 miles (39 km) northeast of Anchorage near the intersection of Mi. 142 of the Alaska Railroad and the Mile 26 of the Glenn Highway 2 miles (3.2 km) from the mouth of the Eklutna River at the head of the Knik Arm of Cook Inlet, at 61°27′30″N 149°21′44″W in the Anchorage Recording District.

The Dena'ina Athabascan village of Eklutna is the last of eight villages that existed before construction of the Alaska Railroad brought an influx of American colonists around 1915. First settled more than 800 years ago, it is the oldest inhabited location in the Anchorage area. Its Dena'ina name is Idlughet [it͡ɬuʁətʰ] ("by the objects", referring to two nearby hills); the name "Eklutna" derives from Idluytnu, the name for Eklutna River, meaning "(plural) objects river".

Russian Orthodox missionaries arrived in the 1840s. The melding of Orthodox Christianity and native practices resulted in the brightly colored spirit houses which can be seen at the Eklutna Cemetery, in use since 1650 and now a historical park. The cemetery is probably the most photographed graveyard in Alaska, overshadowing other features of the village.

An Alaska Railroad siding and station house were built near the village Eklutna in 1918. The federal government operated a boarding school for native children near the village before World War II. The U.S. Army established a facility nearby in the mid-20th century; it is now gone.

In 2014, a 160-acre homestead acquired in 1924 was donated to the Native Village of Dena’ina Athabascan country, where Alaska Native people have lived for thousands of years. For the most part, the land has remained untouched — and under a conservation easement, it will be maintained as a refuge for wildlife and protected from real estate development.

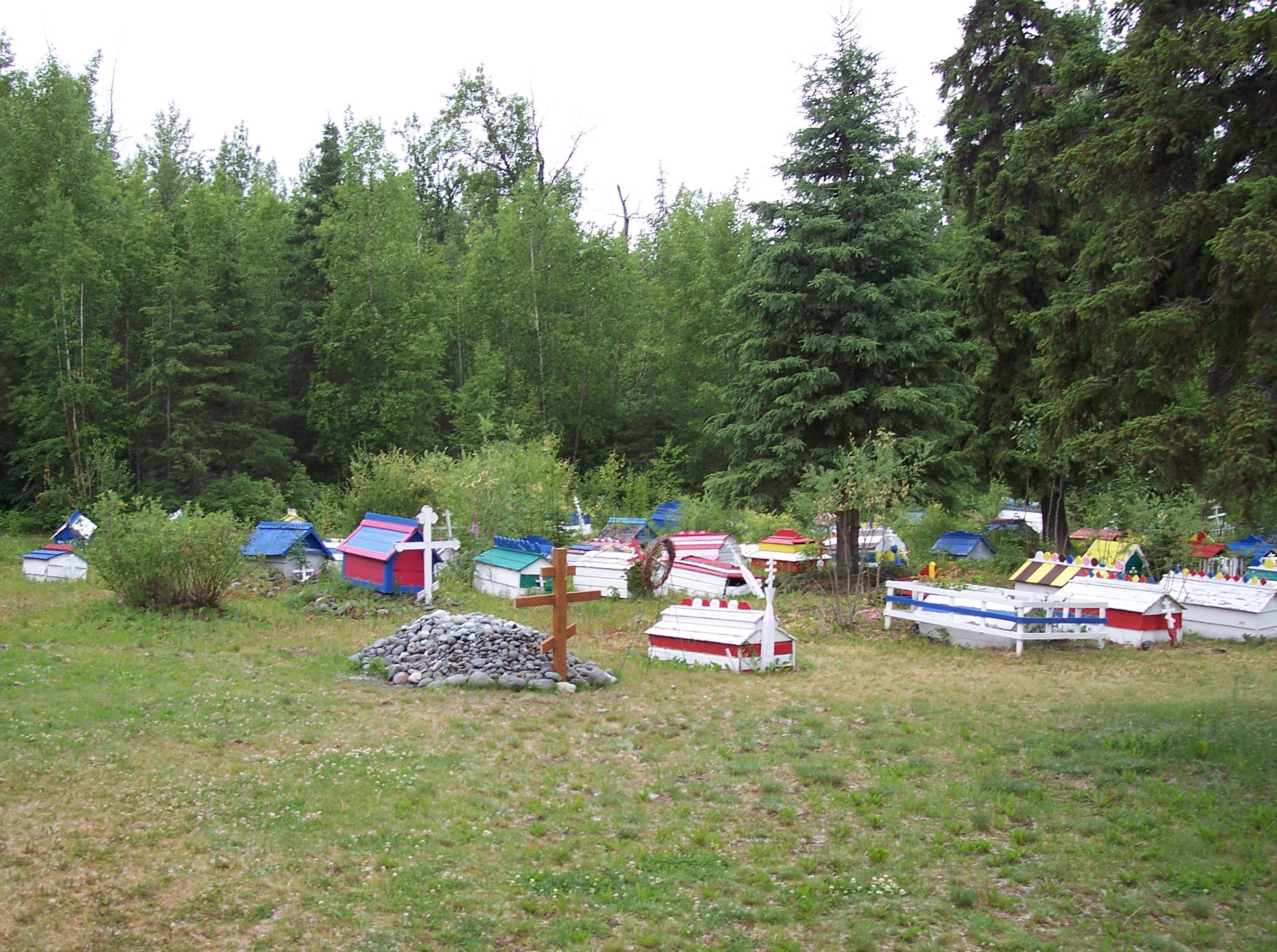
Eklutna Spirit Houses

Virtually all residents of the Eklutna Village are either Alaska Native or part Native; most are members of the federally recognized Native Village of Eklutna. For employment, most Tribal Members commute to work in Anchorage, nearby Eagle River, or the Matanuska-Susitna Valley.

== Demographics ==
Population of Eklutna before absorption
Census	Pop.	Note	%±
1930	158		—
1940	159		0.6%
1950	53		−66.7%
1960	50		−5.7%
1970	25		−50.0%

Eklutna first appeared on the 1930 U.S. Census as an unincorporated village. Of its 158 residents, 61 were Native, 49 were Creole (Mixed Russian & Native), 47 were White, and 1 was Asian. It continued to report on the census until 1970 and was annexed into Anchorage in 1975.

== Education ==
Anchorage School District operates area public schools.

== See also ==
- Eklutna Annie, a known but unidentified victim of serial killer Robert Hansen, found in 1980
