= List of fatal bear attacks in North America =

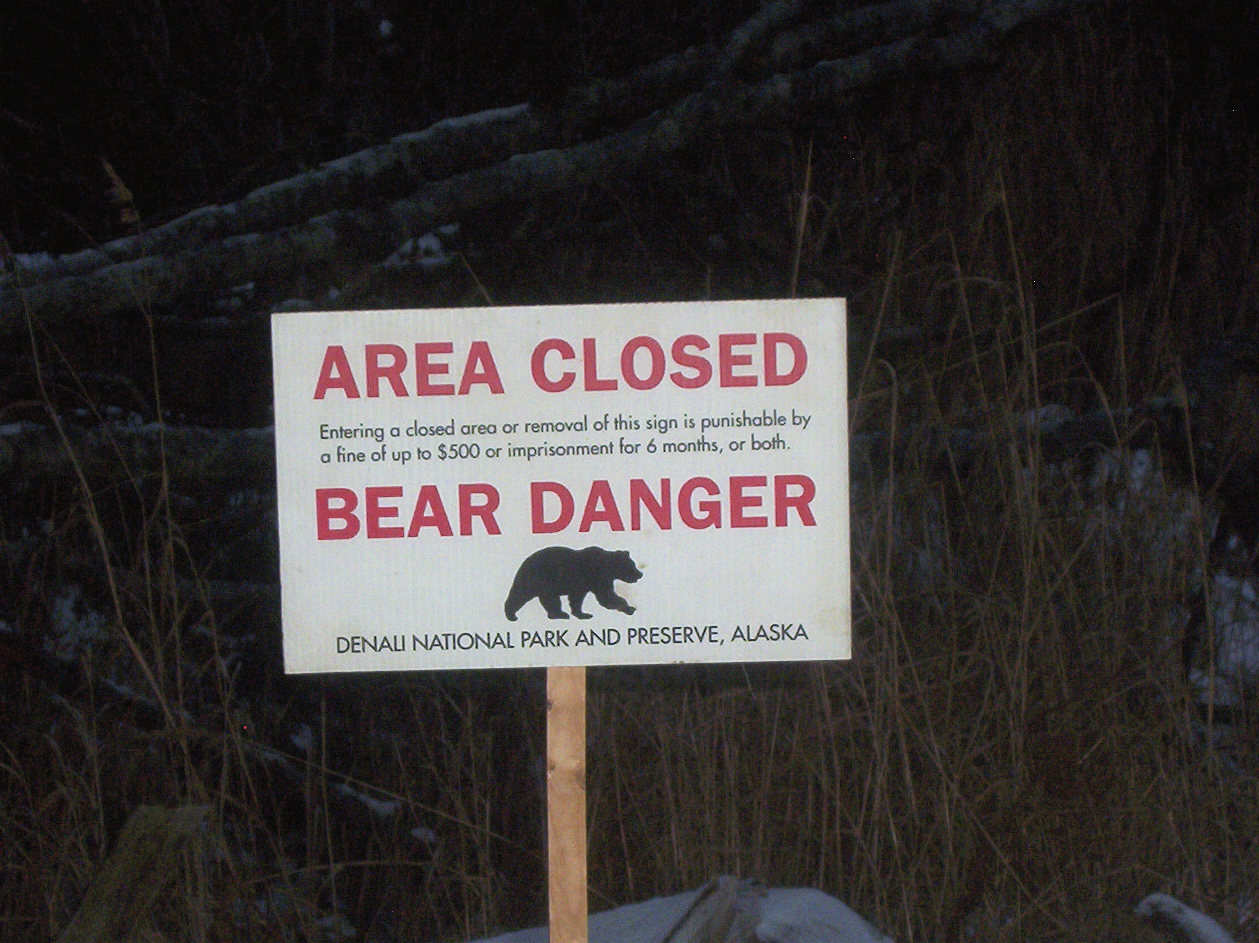
Bear danger area closure sign of the type used at Denali National Park and Preserve

This is a list of human deaths caused by bear attacks in North America by decade in reverse chronological order. These fatalities have been documented through news media, reports, cause-of-death statistics, scientific papers, or other sources. For general information on the topic, see Bear attack.

Fatal bear attacks in North America have occurred in a variety of settings. There have been several in wilderness habitats of bears involving workers, hikers, hunters, and campers. Brown bear (including the subspecies grizzly bear) incidents have occurred in its native range spanning Alaska, Northern Canada, and Western Canada, and portions of the Rocky Mountains in the United States. The locations of black bear wilderness fatal attacks reflect its wider range.

Bears held captive by animal trainers, in zoos or carnivals, or kept as pets, have been responsible for several attacks. There have also been unusual cases in which a person entered a bear's cage and was then mauled.

Bear attacks are rare in North America. Attacks are for predatory, territorial, or protective reasons. Most wilderness attacks have occurred when there were only one or two people in the vicinity.

In this list, three species of bears are recognized: the black bear (Ursus americanus), the brown bear (Ursus arctos), and the polar bear (Ursus maritimus).

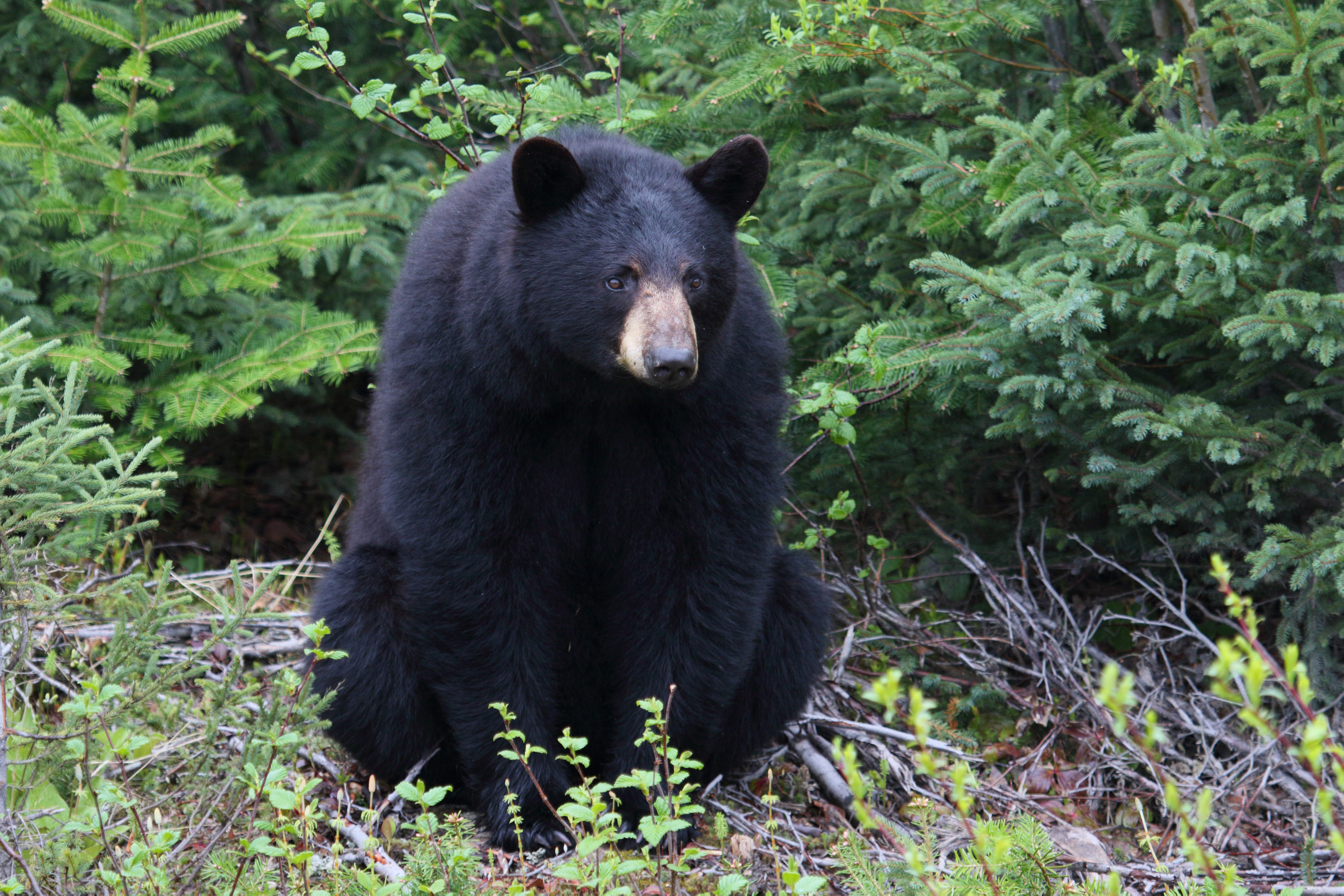
American black bear in Labrador

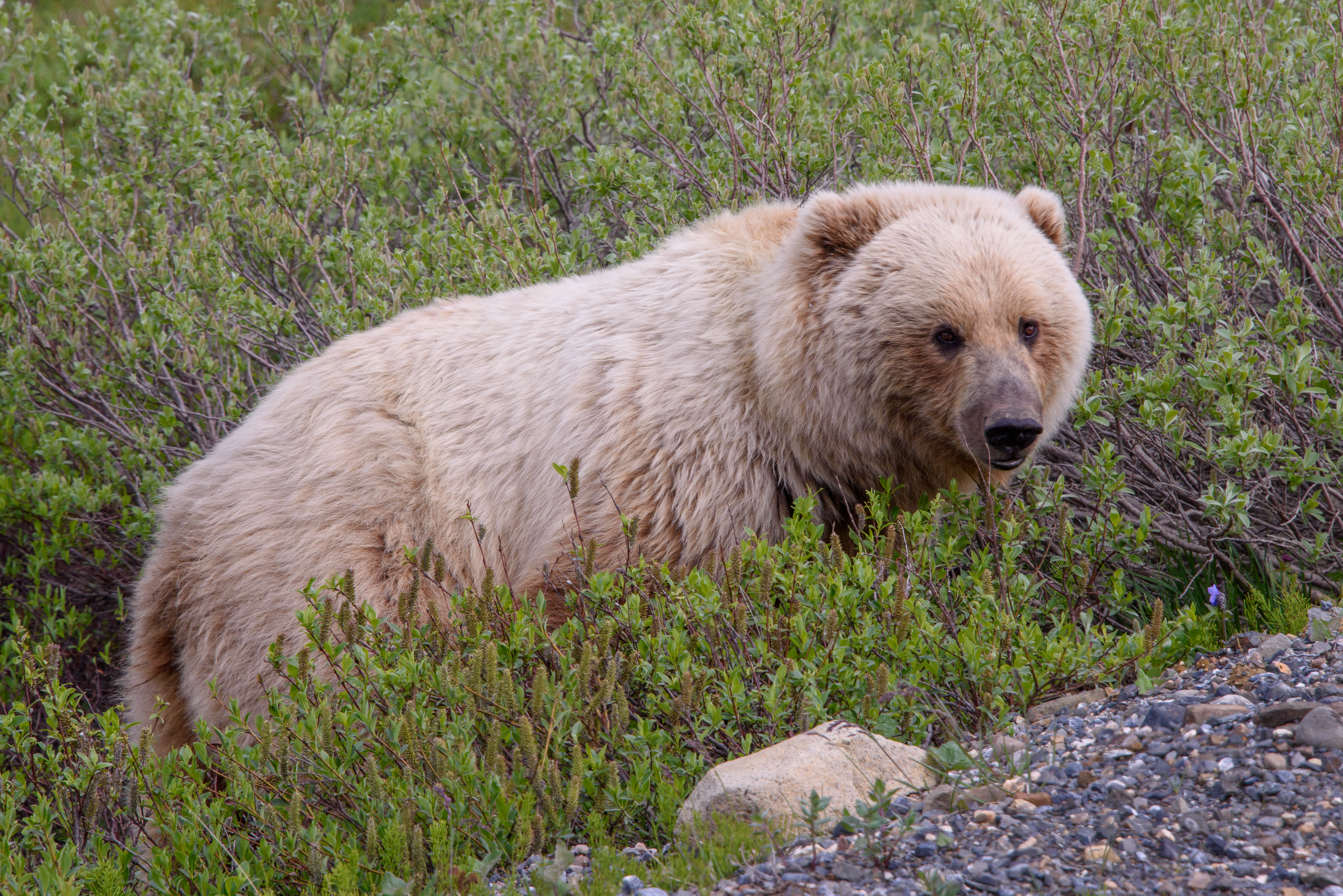
Grizzly bear in Denali National Park, Alaska

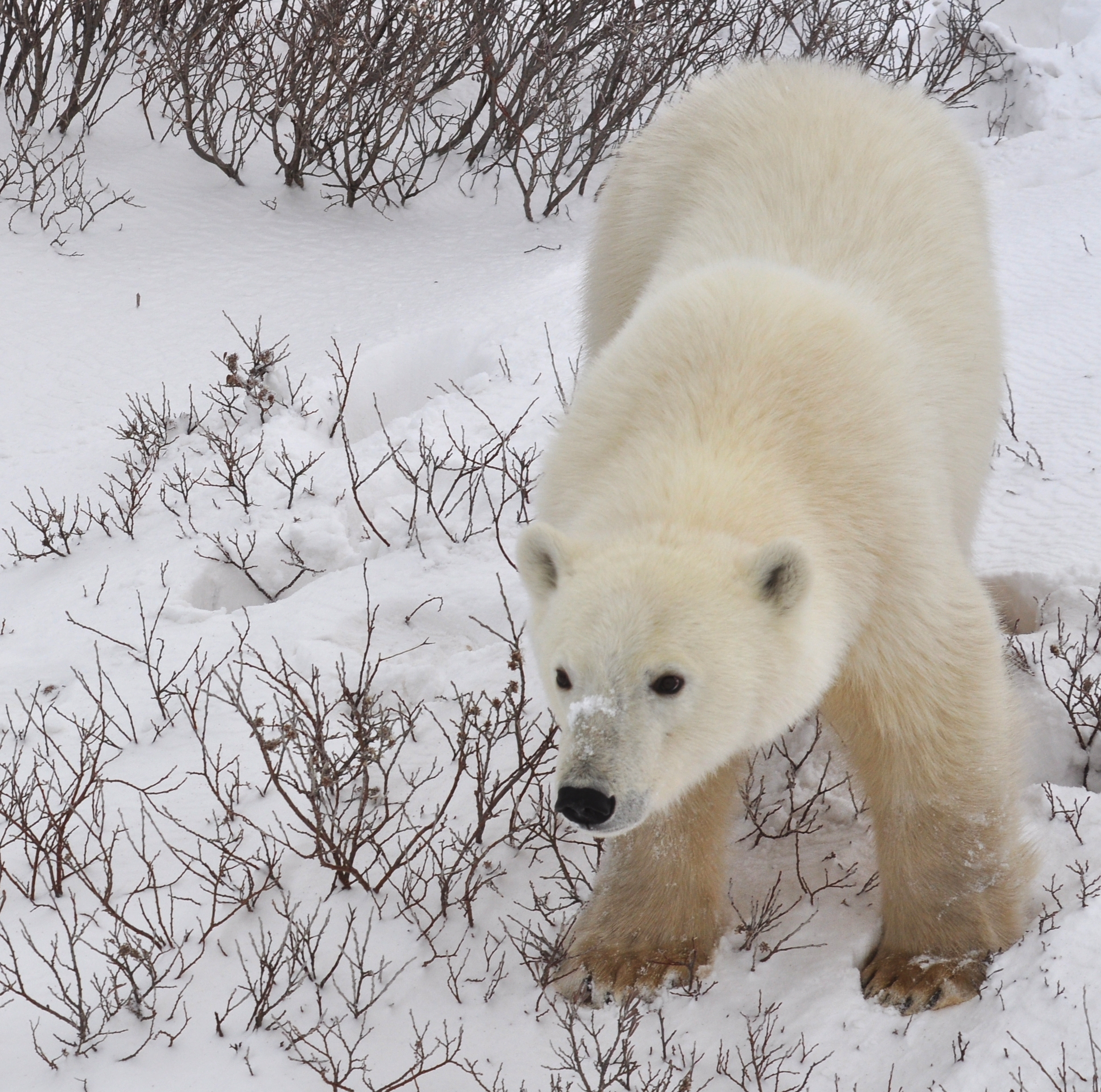
Polar bear in Churchill, Manitoba

== 2020s ==
=== Black bear ===
Date	Victim	Type	Location — Circumstances
July 15, 2026	Jay MacDonald, 70s, male Deb MacDonald, 70s, female	Wild	Canada, Saskatchewan, La Ronge — On July 15, 2026, the couple in their early 70s from Regina, SK were found dead near McTavish Lake, a fly-in lake approximately 90 kilometres north of La Ronge. Jay was found near the lakeshore and Deb was found in the woods near their cabin. Conservation officers euthanized a bear suspected to be involved.
May 8, 2026	Hrishikesh Koloth, 27, male	Wild	Canada, Saskatchewan, Points North — On May 8, 2026, 27-year-old Hrishikesh Koloth was killed by a black bear while working on contract as a technician at a uranium exploration site near Norbye Lake, approximately 850 km northeast of Saskatoon. The bear was shot and killed by a civilian on site, and the animal's corpse was transferred to the Saskatoon's Western College of Veterinary Medicine for necropsy.
October 2, 2025	Max Thomas, 60, male	Wild	United States, Newton County, Arkansas — On October 2, 2025, Max Thomas, 60, was killed by a black bear while at a campground. State officials later shot and killed a bear believed to have killed Thomas. However, on October 23, the Arkansas Game and Fish Commission announced that the bear killed was not the same bear that killed Thomas.
September 14, 2025	Vernon Patton, 72, male	Wild	United States, Franklin County, Arkansas — On September 3, 2025, Vernon Patton, 72, was critically injured by a 70 lb (32 kg) juvenile black bear while he was on a tractor. The bear was attacking Patton when his son showed up and began throwing rocks at the animal. Game wardens responded to the scene and fatally shot the animal. Patton succumbed to his injuries on September 14, 2025.
May 5, 2025	Robert Markel, 89, male	Wild	United States, Collier County, Florida — Robert Markel, an 89-year-old resident of Jerome, Florida, and his daughter's dog were killed by a black bear in separate attacks in an unincorporated part of Collier County just north of Everglades City. Markel's daughter called the police after seeing the bear attack her dog, and she was unable to locate her father in the meantime. It was the first fatal black bear attack on a human in Florida state history. Wildlife officers subsequently killed three bears in the Collier County area, and one was determined to have been responsible for Markel's death.
July 29, 2024	John Woods, 60, male	Wild	Canada, Shamattawa First Nation, Manitoba — The Royal Canadian Mounted Police believes that the victim, who went missing in northeastern Manitoba's Shamattawa First Nation, was killed by a bear. A week before the incident, the RCMP responded to another bear attack that left another person in the area injured. It is so far undetermined if the attack was initiated by a black or a brown bear, or even a polar bear, as the latter has been seen in this area before and descend into land every July when the Hudson Bay ice breaks up.
November 8, 2023	Patrice Miller, 71, female	Wild	United States, Downieville, California — Sheriff's deputies found Miller's remains during a welfare check. There were signs that a bear had entered the house and mauled the body, but initially, the Sierra County Sheriff's Office thought this had happened after Miller's death. However, an autopsy confirmed the bear had killed Miller. The male bear was trapped and killed, and DNA testing confirmed it was the bear responsible. According to the California Department of Fish and Wildlife, Miller's death is the first confirmed fatal attack by a black bear in California.
June 16, 2023	Steven Jackson, 66, male	Wild	United States, Groom Creek, Arizona — The victim was sitting in a chair outside of his campsite when an adult male black bear attacked him. The bear dragged him about 75 yards (68 m) and began consuming him. Neighbors heard his screams for help amid the struggle and tried to scare the bear away by yelling and honking horns, but to no avail. One neighbor eventually grabbed a rifle and shot the bear, killing it, but Jackson was already dead. The bear was 365 lb (166 kg), estimated at 7 to 10 years old, and was in good condition with no signs of disease. Officials ultimately determined that the bear acted in an unprovoked predatory attack.
July 31, 2021	Unnamed female, 26	Wild	Canada, Swan Hills, Alberta — The victim worked for a helicopter company, which provided transportation for tree planters, when she was attacked by an adult female black bear. The woman was killed as result of the attack. The bear was tracked and killed by authorities.
April 30, 2021	Laney Malavolta, 39, female	Wild	United States, Durango, Colorado — Malavolta was attacked and killed while hiking with her dogs in the forest above and to the west of US 550, near Trimble. Her body showed signs of partial consumption. Authorities euthanized a mother black bear and two cubs found nearby. After an autopsy, it was determined that the mother bear and one of her cubs had fed upon Malavolta.
September 2020	Patrick Madura, 43, male	Wild	United States, Great Smoky Mountains National Park, North Carolina — Madura was backpacking in the park. His remains were found on September 11, 2020, near the remote Hazel Creek area where he had been camping. Backpackers first found an unoccupied tent at Hazel Creek Campsite 82, then discovered what appeared to be human remains across the creek with a bear scavenging in the area and alerted park rangers. An autopsy concluded that Madura had been killed by the bear.
August 20, 2020	Stephanie Blais, 44, female	Wild	Canada, Buffalo Narrows, Saskatchewan — Blais was communicating with her father from a satellite phone while camping with her two children and husband at a family cabin on McKie Lake when the bear attacked her. Her husband, Curtis, was inside the cabin's kitchen 98 feet (30 m) away. The investigation showed the attack was unprovoked and predatory in nature. Curtis subsequently sprayed the bear with pepper spray, but this only aggravated the animal. He grabbed a gun and shot it twice, killing the bear.
July 20, 2020	Peter Franczak, 67, male	Wild	Canada, Red Lake, Ontario — Franczak went blueberry picking in the morning and did not return. Officers of the Ontario Provincial Police went to search for him and found his remains along with a black bear in the vicinity. Postmortem examination later attributed Franczak's death to be a bear attack. The bear was killed by police when they arrived at the scene.

=== Brown bear ===
Date	Victim	Type	Location — Circumstances
November 1, 2026	Jenny Balcarras, 48, female Selah Reed, 20, female	Wild	Bella Coola, British Columbia - British Columbia Conservation Officer Service (BCCOS) found two peoples' remains 150m apart in the Snooka West Trail area. The bears involved were a sow and three cubs that were less than a year old. Jeff Tyre with the BCCOS said forensic testing confirmed the bears were responsible and that all four captured animals involved in the "heartbreaking event" have been put down. The attack was "predatory" in nature which is "very rare". The attack comes nearly a year after a group of school children and teachers were attacked near Bella Coola last year.
May 3, 2026	Anthony Pollio, 33, male	Wild	Glacier National Park, Montana - A Florida man was killed by a grizzly bear on the Mt. Brown trail, toward the Mt. Brown Fire Lookout in Glacier National Park. Mr Pollio was attacked and killed while solo hiking back down the trail at approximately 9.30 p.m. The body of the victim was found about 2.5 miles from the trailhead, about 50 feet off the trail in a densely wooded area. An empty can of bear spray was found nearby. According to the official investigation report, the attack was the result of a close-range surprise encounter with a 15 year old male grizzly. The attack was deemed defensive by investigators. It is the first fatal bear attack in Glacier National Park since 1998.
October 25, 2025	Joe Pendry, 63, male	Wild	Canada, Regional District of East Kootenay, B.C — Joe was attacked by a grizzly sow while out hunting in East Kootenay B.C, on October 2. Initially, he survived and was treated and in stable condition at the Kelowna General Hospital, where he underwent four surgeries including a skin graft on his scalp. The bear was reportedly shot in the hip, but that wasn't sufficient to repel the attack, as it kept charging at Joe. The bear later died after the encounter just two kilometres away.
October 29, 2024	Tad Fujioka, 50, male	Wild	United States, Sitka, Alaska — Fujioka was reported overdue from a deer hunting trip on October 29, 2024. At approximately 11:30 on October 30, 2024 search teams located his remains.
September 29, 2023	Doug Inglis, 62, male Jenny Gusse, 62, female	Wild	Canada, Red Deer River Valley, Banff National Park, Alberta — A response team trained in wildlife attacks were mobilized, after receiving an alert from an inReach GPS device at about 8 p.m. on September 29, 2023 stating "bear attack bad" but weather conditions at the time did not allow for helicopter use, leading the team to travel to the location by ground through the night. The response team arrived at 1 a.m. on September 30 and found two deceased individuals and their dog (Tress), also killed. A grizzly bear displaying aggressive behavior was encountered and euthanized at the site.
July 22, 2023	Amie Adamson, 48, female	Wild	United States, West Yellowstone, Montana — Adamson's body was discovered July 22, 2023 by a hiker on the Buttermilk Trail, located about 8 miles (13 km) west of the gateway community of West Yellowstone, Montana. Montana Department of Fish, Wildlife and Parks (MFWP) said July 23 that grizzly bear tracks were found at the scene and that the investigation is ongoing, while the coroner's office quickly determined that she died of severe blood loss due to a mauling. The grizzly bear was later killed by wildlife staff after it broke into a home near West Yellowstone on September 2, 2023, accompanied by a cub. DNA indicated that the same bear had also injured a person near an Idaho state park in May 2020, in a close range encounter near a moose carcass.
May 10, 2022	Seth Michael Plant, 30, male	Wild	United States, Joint Base Elmendorf–Richardson, Alaska — A group of soldiers were attacked by a sow while mapping out a training site for a land navigation course. Their presence prompted the bear to emerge from its den and knock down two of the soldiers; one later died.
March 25, 2022	Craig Clouatre, 40, male	Wild	United States, Six Mile Creek, Park County, Montana — Clouatre's maimed body was discovered on March 25.
July 6, 2021	Leah Davis Lokan, 65, female	Wild	United States, Ovando, Montana — Lokan was attacked and killed in her tent in the village of Ovando by a grizzly bear. The bear had initially entered the campsite and awakened Lokan and other campers, who chased the bear away by making noise. Approximately an hour later, at roughly 4AM, the bear returned to the campsite and attacked Lokan in her tent. Again, other campers awoke and confronted the bear, this time spraying the bear with bear spray, causing it to leave the area. Efforts to revive Lokan were unsuccessful. The grizzly bear was later identified and killed by wildlife officials.
May 25, 2021	Barbara Collister, female, 68	Wild	Canada, Water Valley, Alberta — Collister was attacked and killed by a bear while walking on trails on her private property. An aggressive grizzly sow and a cub were observed shortly afterwards by wildlife officers nearby. A mature non-lactating female grizzly bear with worn teeth was then captured and euthanized, with DNA testing confirming this was the responsible bear. This attack occurred about 24 kilometres away from the May 4, 2021, attack that killed David Lertzman, but the DNA testing confirmed that different bears were involved.
May 4, 2021	David Lertzman, 59, male	Wild	Canada, Waiparous, Alberta — Lertzman was attacked and killed by a bear, determined to be a female brown bear, while out jogging. The bear is suspected to have attacked Lertzman from behind, sending him off a 300m embankment. In 2024 the same bear attacked a woman near Madden, northwest of Calgary. The female bear was with cubs at the time of the attack.
April 17, 2021	Charles "Carl" Mock, 40, male	Wild	United States, West Yellowstone, Montana — Wilderness guide Charles "Carl" Mock, 40, was attacked on Thursday, April 15, 2021, while fishing north of West Yellowstone near Baker's Hole Campground. He was mauled by a 20-year-old male grizzly bear likely defending a moose carcass near Yellowstone National Park and died in a hospital on April 17. The offending bear was shot and killed by wildlife authorities after it charged them.
September 20, 2020	Austin Pfeiffer, 22, male	Wild	United States, Wrangell–St. Elias National Park and Preserve, Alaska — Pfeiffer was on a 10-day moose hunt with a friend near the Chisana River Drainage. He was cleaning a moose they had killed when the bear attacked without warning. Pfeiffer was killed by the bear.
July 29, 2020	Daniel Schilling, 46, male	Wild	United States, Hope, Alaska — Schilling was killed while clearing a path several miles behind his cabin. An empty can of bear spray was found at the scene. There were no witnesses to the attack.

=== Polar bear ===
Date	Victim	Type	Location — Circumstances
August 8, 2024	Christopher Best, 34, male	Wild	Canada, Brevoort Island, Nunavut — Christopher Best, a 34-year-old employee of the Nasittuq Corporation working at BAF-3, a North Warning System Long Range Radar site, was attacked and killed by two polar bears outside the station. Best was attempting to take photographs of one of the bears when another bear he was unaware of blocked his escape route to a building before charging him, with the first bear joining in the attack. Other workers scared off the bears with a non-lethal bear-banger but were forced to kill one of the bears who turned around and charged one of the employees.
January 17, 2023	Summer Myomick, 24, female Clyde Ongtowasruk, 1, male	Wild	United States, Wales, Alaska — Myomick was attacked and killed by a polar bear in the small village of Wales, Alaska. The attack happened at 2:30 pm. The polar bear had chased several residents of the community, before it killed the woman and her 1-year-old son. The bear was shot and killed by a local resident as it attacked the pair.

== 2010s ==
=== Black bear ===
Date	Victim	Type	Location — Circumstances
September 1, 2019	Catherine Sweatt Mueller, 62, female	Wild	Canada, Red Pine Island, Ontario — Sweatt-Mueller left her cabin on an island on Rainy Lake, Ontario, to check on her dogs and did not return. Police sent to find her encountered a large black bear near her body. The bear, which was behaving in a predatory manner, was killed on the spot.
June 19, 2017	Erin Johnson, 27, female	Wild	United States, Pogo mine, Alaska — Johnson, a contract employee for Pogo Mine, was killed while collecting soil samples. The bear was shot and killed by mine personnel.
June 18, 2017	Patrick Cooper, 16, male	Wild	United States, Indian, Alaska — Cooper was chased and killed by a bear while participating in and completing the juniors' division of the Bird Ridge trail's running race. Cooper called his brother as he descended the trail, to say he was being followed by a bear. Searchers found the runner's remains 500 yards (457 m) from the trail and shot the bear in the face with a shotgun, which scared the bear and forced him into the woods away from the body.
October 1, 2015	Barbara Paschke, 85, female	Wild	United States, west of Kalispell, Montana — Paschke was attacked inside her home near Kalispell by a black bear on September 27. According to Montana Department of Fish, Wildlife, and Parks, Paschke regularly illegally provided grain and birdseed to bears on her property, and had been cited for illegally feeding bears and other wildlife in 2012. Paschke died of her injuries on October 1, 2015, in a Kalispell hospital. Officials trapped and killed two food-conditioned black bears on Paschke's property, but were unable to capture or remove the bear that attacked Paschke. DNA identified one of the euthanized bears as a sibling of the bear involved in the fatal attack.
May 10, 2015	Daniel Ward O'Connor, 27, male	Wild	Canada, near Mackenzie, British Columbia — Ward was killed by a bear while he slept near the fire pit at his campsite. His fiancée who slept in a nearby motorhome discovered his remains the following morning. The bear was later shot and killed by conservation officers.
September 21, 2014	Darsh Patel, 22, male	Wild	United States, near West Milford, New Jersey — Darsh Patel was about to begin hiking with four friends in Apshawa Preserve when they met a man and a woman at the entrance who told them there was a bear nearby and advised them to turn around. They continued on, found the bear, and Patel and another hiker took photos. They turned and began walking away, but the bear followed them. The hikers ran in different directions, and found that Patel was missing when they regrouped. Authorities found Patel's body after searching for two hours. A black bear found in the vicinity was killed and a necropsy revealed human remains in its digestive tract. According to the State Department of Environmental Protection, this was the first fatal bear attack on a human in New Jersey on record.
May 7, 2014	Lorna Weafer, 36, female	Wild	Canada, near Fort McMurray, Alberta — Weafer, a Suncor worker was attacked at the remote North Steepbank oil sands mine site while walking back to work after a trip to the washroom. Efforts by co-workers to scare off the bear were unsuccessful. The Royal Canadian Mounted Police shot and killed the bear upon arrival. A preliminary investigation determined that the attack was predatory.
June 6, 2013	Robert Weaver, 64, male	Wild	United States, near Delta Junction, Alaska — Weaver was attacked by a black bear while walking back to his cabin on George Lake, according to his wife, who was able to flee inside the cabin and was uninjured. A 230 lb (104.3 kg) adult male black bear on the scene was killed by troopers and found to have some of Weaver's remains in his stomach.
July 25, 2011	Lana Hollingsworth, 61, female	Wild	United States, Pinetop-Lakeside, Arizona — Hollingsworth was attacked by a 250 lb (113.4 kg) black bear while walking her dog at a country club. Nearly a month later and after eleven surgeries, she died from a massive brain hemorrhage, which doctors believe was a result of the attack. The bear was tracked, shot, and killed.
June 2011	Bernice Adolph, 72, female	Wild	Canada, near Lillooet, British Columbia — Adolph's remains were found by police dogs after she was reported missing. She was an elder in the Xaxli'p First Nation. There was evidence that bears fed on Adolph's remains, and tried to enter her house. An autopsy confirmed that she died from a bear attack. Five bears suspected of being involved were killed by conservation officers, and DNA tests confirmed that one of the dead bears killed Adolph.
August 19, 2010	Brent Kandra, 24, male	Captive	United States, Columbia Station, Ohio — Kandra was a bear caretaker on the property of Sam Mazzola, who kept exotic pets. The bear was out of its cage for feeding. Prior to the attack, Sam Mazzola had had his license to exhibit animals revoked, but he was still allowed to keep the animals on his property. He also accumulated dozens of dangerous, exotic animals despite past convictions and losing his license after animal rights activists complained he was making money by letting people wrestle bears.

=== Brown bear ===
Date	Victim	Type	Location — Circumstances
August 15, 2019	Julien Gauthier, 44, male	Wild	Canada, Tulita, Northwest Territories — The French composer and soundman was travelling along the Mackenzie River to record sounds of nature for a musical project. When he was asleep in his tent, he was grabbed by a grizzly and taken away and eaten by the bear. His corpse was found the next day.
November 26, 2018	Valérie Théorêt, 37, female Adele Roesholt, 10 months, female	Wild	Canada, Einarson Lake, Yukon — The mother and child were attacked near their cabin while on a trip to manage trapping lines. The child's father (Gjermund Roesholt) shot the bear dead when he returned to the cabin and it charged him.
October 1, 2018	Anthony David Montoya, 18, male	Wild	United States, Admiralty Island, Alaska — Montoya was working at a remote mining site on Admiralty Island, Alaska, when he was killed and eaten by a sow brown bear and two cubs. All three bears were killed.
September 14, 2018	Mark Uptain, 37, male	Wild	United States, Teton Wilderness, Wyoming — Uptain, a guide for Martin Outfitters, was cleaning an elk that he and his client Corey Chubon had shot when the bear attacked. The bear was a sow with a 1½-year-old male cub. The hunter and his guide were dressing an elk carcass and had left a canister of bear spray and a Glock 20 pistol out of reach. As the bear attacked, Chubon, unfamiliar with the operation of a Glock pistol, was unable to fire and attempted to throw it at Uptain who failed to catch it. The bear turned on Uptain. Chubon fled with injuries as the bear attacked Uptain. After staggering 50 yards (46 m) uphill from the dead elk, Uptain was killed by the mother and possibly by the cub as well. The bears were shot and killed by Wyoming Fish and Game officials.
June 19, 2018	Mike Soltis, 44, male	Wild	United States, Eagle River, Alaska — Soltis was day hiking alone along the Eagle River. After failing to return, a search party was dispatched. Rangers found a grizzly bear sitting on Soltis's remains. The bear then attacked the search party, badly mauling one searcher. The search party retreated from the area. The bear escaped before more searchers arrived.
June 29, 2016	Brad Treat, 38, male	Wild	United States, Flathead National Forest, Montana — Treat and another man were on mountain bikes on U.S. Forest Service land near Halfmoon Lakes. According to the official Board of Review report on the incident, Treat's mountain bike collided at high speed with a large male grizzly bear "after rounding a blind curve in the trail." The bear immediately attacked Treat in response to being struck by the bicycle. The second rider escaped uninjured and summoned help. The bear was identified via DNA from a previous research project, but was not captured or killed because its behavior was a natural response to a surprise encounter involving physical contact.
August 7, 2015	Lance Crosby, 63, male	Wild	United States, Yellowstone National Park, Wyoming — Crosby, an employee at a medical clinic in the park, was reported missing when he did not report for work. A park ranger found his body in a popular off-trail area less than a mile (1 600 m) from Elephant Back Loop Trail, an area he was known to frequent. His body was partially consumed and covered. Puncture wounds on his arms indicated he had tried to defend himself. Based on the presence of a sow grizzly and a cub in the area, the sow was deemed responsible for the attack. The sow was captured and killed after it was found to be the bear that killed Crosby. There were public appeals to not kill the sow, but the park superintendent decided there was a risk the sow might kill again; based on July 6, 2011, and August 24, 2011, killings in the park, where another sow was present at both those killings.
October 14, 2014	Claudia Huber, 42, female	Wild	Canada, near Teslin, Yukon — A 25-year-old healthy male grizzly bear broke into a home and chased the victim and her husband outside. The bear pursued and fatally attacked Ms. Huber. Her husband, Matthias Liniger, shot at the bear and killed it.
September 17, 2014	Ken Novotny, 53, male	Wild	Canada, near Norman Wells, Northwest Territories — While on a hunting trip near Norman Wells, Novotny was charged and struck by a bear. Friends reported Novotny had just killed a moose and was processing the carcass when the bear "came out of nowhere." He died on the scene. Authorities later found and killed the bear responsible for his death.
September 7, 2014	Rick Cross, 54, male	Wild	Canada, Kananaskis Country, Alberta — Cross, a hunter, was killed by a mother bear when he accidentally got between her and her cubs. Park rangers stated that it appeared that Cross managed to fire his rifle before being overwhelmed. RCMP said it appeared he wandered into the area where the mother and cub were feeding on a dead deer.
September 4, 2014	Adam Thomas Stewart, 31, male	Wild	United States, Bridger-Teton National Forest, Wyoming — Stewart was conducting research alone in the Bridger-Teton National Forest in northwest Wyoming near the SE corner of Yellowstone National Park. This is high density bear habitat and he was in Cub Creek. After he failed to return, a search found his body. The coroner suspects it was a grizzly bear, but the species has not officially been determined. The pathologist noted antemortem punctures to Stewart's skull, indicating the cause of death was from a bear attack. The FWS report says he was not carrying bear spray or a firearm.
October 11, 2012	Tomas Puerta, 54, male	Wild	United States, Chichagof Island, Alaska — After passers-by spotted an unattended skiff, they investigated and encountered a grizzly bear sow and two cubs. Alaska State troopers and Sitka Mountain rescue personnel then found evidence of a campsite and fire on the beach. There was evidence of a struggle, and upon following a trail of disturbed vegetation, they found Puerta's body, cached and partially eaten.
August 24, 2012	Richard White, 49, male	Wild	United States, Denali National Park, Alaska — White was backpacking alone along the Toklat River. After hikers found an abandoned backpack and torn clothing, rangers investigated and found a male grizzly bear sitting on White's remains. The bear was shot and killed by an Alaska State Trooper. A necropsy of the bear and photographs recovered from White's camera confirmed the attack. The photographs in White's camera showed that he was taking photos of the bear in a span of eight minutes from 50 yards (46 m) to 100 yards (91 m). It was the first fatal bear attack recorded in Denali National Park.
August 24, 2011	John Wallace, 59, male	Wild	United States, Yellowstone National Park, Wyoming — Wallace's remains were found by hikers on the Mary Mountain Trail, northeast of Old Faithful. Wallace was hiking alone. An autopsy showed that Wallace died from a bear attack. According to a report released by Yellowstone rangers, park officials had attempted to give Wallace a lecture about bear safety, but he was not interested, calling himself a "grizzly bear expert". DNA evidence later determined that the same sow that killed Brian Matayoshi July 6, 2011, was in the vicinity of Wallace's corpse, though it was not proved that this bear killed Wallace. The bear was killed by park officials. Evidence showed that Wallace was attacked after sitting down on a log to eat a snack and the attack was predatory, rather than defensive.
July 6, 2011	Brian Matayoshi, 57, male	Wild	United States, Yellowstone National Park, Wyoming — Matayoshi and his wife were hiking the Wapiti Lake Trail, and came upon a mother grizzly bear in an open meadow. The couple began to walk away, and the bear charged. After attempting to run away, Matayoshi was fatally bitten and clawed. Matayoshi's wife hid behind a tree, was lifted from the ground by the bear, and dropped. She played dead, and the bear left the area. She was not injured. An initial investigation by the National Park Service found the bear's actions were defensive against a perceived threat to her cubs. Since the attack was not predatory and the bear had no known violent history towards humans, no immediate action was taken towards the bear. It was later killed after it was found to be at the site of another fatal attack August 24, 2011. A later investigation determined that the couple's running from the bear was a mistake, and the fatal attack was a "one in 3 million occurrence".
July 28, 2010	Kevin Kammer, 48, male	Wild	United States, Gallatin National Forest, Montana — Kammer was in his tent at Soda Butte Campground when a mother bear attacked and dragged him 25 feet (7.6 m) away. Two other campers in separate campsites were also attacked: a man was bitten in the leg, and a woman was bitten in the arm and upper body. The bear was caught in a trap set at the campground using pieces of a culvert and Kammer's tent. Later, the bear was killed, and her cubs were sent to ZooMontana. The mother bear's unusual predatory behavior was noted by authorities.
June 17, 2010	Erwin Frank Evert, 70, male	Wild	United States, Shoshone National Forest, Wyoming — Evert, a field botanist, was mauled by a grizzly bear while hiking in the Kitty Creek Drainage area of the Shoshone National Forest, just east of Yellowstone National Park. The bear was trapped and tranquilized earlier in the day by a grizzly bear research team. Two days after the attack, the bear was shot and killed from a helicopter by wildlife officials. Initially it was reported that Evert ignored posted warnings to avoid the area due to the potential danger involved with the bear research. However, the sheriff's deputy who recovered the body and members of Evert's family stated that the warning signs were no longer present. A report released the following month confirmed that the warning signs were removed, though it also asserted that Evert knew there was a bear research study being conducted in the area. Evert's wife filed a wrongful death lawsuit against the federal government, which was dismissed by district court judge Nancy D. Freudenthal.

=== Polar bear ===
Date	Victim	Type	Location — Circumstances
August 23, 2018	Darryl Kaunak, 33, male	Wild	Canada, Lyon Inlet, Nunavut — Three men from Naujaat, whose boat had broken down, were having tea on the morning of August 23 when a female bear and a cub surprised them. Leo Ijjangiaq fired a rifle to scare the bear but it attacked Laurent Junior Uttak before killing Darryl Kaunak. The mother and cub were killed. During the next three days, prior to being rescued, more bears approached the two survivors and at least one more bear was killed.
July 3, 2018	Aaron Gibbons, 31, male	Wild	Canada, Sentry Island, Nunavut — A polar bear approached a man and his children on Sentry Island. The man, identified as 31-year-old Aaron Gibbons from Arviat, put himself between the children and the bear and was attacked, causing fatal injuries. The bear was killed by other people who were also in the area.

== 2000s ==
=== Black bear ===
Date	Victim	Type	Location — Circumstances
October 4, 2009	Kelly Ann Walz, 37, female	Captive	United States, Ross Township, Pennsylvania — Walz, whose husband had an expired license to keep exotic animals, was attacked while cleaning her pet bear's cage. She tried to distract the bear by throwing dog food to the opposite end of the cage. A neighbor shot and killed the bear.
September 15, 2009	Alexandrina Gavriloaia-Bunduc, 46, female	Wild	Canada, ZEC Wessonneau, Québec — Bunduc was accompanying her husband, a forestry worker, while he did clearing works. The bear mauled Bunduc's neck from behind, killing her instantly from a fractured spine. According to the coroner, she "never saw it coming". Initially, it was thought that a car accident while her husband was transporting her to the hospital might have killed her, but this possibility was later ruled out. A bear suspected to have attacked Bunduc was captured.
August 7, 2009	Donna Munson, 74, female	Wild	United States, Ouray, Colorado — Munson had been feeding bears for a decade, and was repeatedly warned by wildlife officials. After a bear was injured in a fight with an older and bigger bear, Munson left food out to help the injured bear. The older bear came back to Munson's property, forced its way past a wire fence, and mauled Munson. Later, wildlife officials killed two bears on Munson's property. One of the bears had a necropsy which revealed evidence that it consumed Munson.
May 30, 2008	Cécile Lavoie, 70, female	Wild	Canada, near La Sarre, Quebec — After Lavoie did not return to her cabin following a solo fishing outing, her husband went looking for her. He found a bear dragging her body into the woods.
July 20, 2007	Robin Kochorek, 31, female	Wild	Canada, Panorama Mountain Resort, British Columbia — Kochorek was reported missing after mountain biking. A black bear was found near her corpse the morning after her disappearance. The bear was shot on sight by the Royal Canadian Mounted Police (RCMP).
June 17, 2007	Samuel Evan Ives, 11, male	Wild	United States, Uinta National Forest, Utah — Ives was grabbed from a family tent in American Fork Canyon, and fatally mauled. State wildlife officials killed the bear, which had entered the campsite the night before. Ives' family sued the U.S. Forest Service because there was no warning about the bear's presence. A judge awarded the family $1.95 million. It was the first known fatal black bear attack in Utah.
April 13, 2006	Elora Petrasek, 6, female	Wild	United States, Cherokee National Forest, Tennessee — A bear attacked the family at a waterfall near a campground. Petrasek's mother and brother were also injured. The bear was trapped and killed, and an unrelated bear was mistakenly killed.
September 6, 2005	Jacqueline Perry, 30, female	Wild	Canada, Missinaibi Lake Provincial Park, Ontario — Perry was killed in an attack at a remote campsite. Her husband was seriously injured trying to protect her with a Swiss Army knife, and later was given a Star of Courage award from Governor General Michaëlle Jean. Ministry of Natural Resources staff shot and killed the bear near the area where the fatal attack occurred. The attack was dramatized in the 2014 Canadian film Backcountry by director Adam MacDonald.
August 26, 2005	Harvey Robinson, 69, male	Wild	Canada, Selkirk, Manitoba — Robinson was fatally mauled while picking plums north of Winnipeg, Manitoba. Robinson's family were investigating the area with an RCMP officer later that day, and were also attacked. The officer shot and killed the bear.
June 14, 2005	Merlyn Carter, 71, male	Wild	Canada, Nonacho Lake, Northwest Territories — Carter was found dead behind the main cabin of his fishing camp. Carter's son came to the cabin the day after the attack, and shot and killed the bear. Later, the Hay River Airport was named in his honor.
September 29, 2002	Maurice Malenfant, 77, male	Wild	Canada, Saint-Zénon-du-Lac-Humqui, Quebec — Malenfant was attacked in his campsite in the Gaspé region of Quebec.
September 1, 2002	Christopher Bayduza, 31, male	Wild	Canada, near Fort Nelson, British Columbia — After going for a walk behind a trailer, Bayduza was attacked at a remote oil rigging site in northeastern British Columbia.
August 19, 2002	Esther Schwimmer, 5 months, female	Wild	United States, Fallsburg, New York — A bear knocked Schwimmer from her stroller, which was near the porch of her family's vacation home. The bear carried the infant in its mouth to the woods. Schwimmer died of neck and head injuries.
August 18, 2001	Adelia Maestras Trujillo, 93, female	Wild	United States, Mora, New Mexico — A bear broke through a glass pane to gain entry into Trujillo's house and killed her. Trujillo's body was found in her kitchen. The bear was shot 0.5 miles (0.80 km) from the house.
June 3, 2001	Kyle Harry, 18, male	Wild	Canada, near Yellowknife, Northwest Territories — Harry was attacked while with one other teenager at a rural campsite 25 kilometres (16 mi) east of Yellowknife.
July 2, 2000	Mary Beth Miller, 24, female	Wild	Canada, near Valcartier, Quebec — Miller was attacked while on a biathlon training run in a wooded area on a military base. The bear was trapped and killed four days later.
May 21, 2000	Glenda Ann Bradley, 50, female	Wild	United States, Great Smoky Mountains National Park, Tennessee — Bradley was attacked and partially consumed by a mother bear and a cub, 1.5 miles (2.4 km) upstream from Elkmont, Tennessee. It was the first fatal bear attack in a southeastern U.S. National Park. While hovering over Bradley's corpse, the bears were shot and killed by park rangers.

=== Brown bear ===
Date	Victim	Type	Location — Circumstances
October 1, 2008	Robert Wagner, 48, male	Wild	Canada, near Sundre, Alberta — Wagner was reported missing after not returning from a hunting trip. His body was found less than 1 kilometre (0.62 mi) from his parked truck. An autopsy revealed that he had been killed by a grizzly bear, which was shot by wildlife officers.
April 22, 2008	Stephan Miller, 39, male	Captive	United States, Big Bear Lake, California — Rocky, a bear trained to perform in movies turned on its handler, fatally biting him in the neck. Prior to the attack, the bear was featured in the movie Semi-Pro. Pepper spray was used to subdue the bear.
November 25, 2007	Don Peters, 51, male	Wild	Canada, near Sundre, Alberta — Peters' body was found 200 metres (660 ft) from his parked truck. He was on a hunting trip. An autopsy confirmed that he died due to a grizzly bear attack. The bear that attacked Peters was captured and killed the following April.
April 28, 2006	Jean-François Pagé, 28, male	Wild	Canada, near Ross River, Yukon — Pagé was mauled while staking mineral claims. He unknowingly walked right past a bear den containing a sow and two cubs.
September 20, 2005	Arthur Louie, 60, male	Wild	Canada, near Bowron River, British Columbia — A female and two cubs attacked Louie on a remote forestry road. He was walking back to his gold mining camp after his car broke down.
June 23, 2005	Rich Huffman, 61, male Kathy Huffman, 58, female	Wild	United States, Arctic National Wildlife Refuge, Alaska — The Huffmans were attacked while in their tent at a campsite along the Hulahula River 12 miles (19 km) upriver from Kaktovik. Two days later the campsite was discovered by three rafters while the bear was still nearby. The bear chased the rafters down the river for over half a mile (800 m) until it finally gave up. Later, a North Slope Borough Police officer investigating the scene shot and killed the bear at the campsite.
June 5, 2005	Isabelle Dubé, 35, female	Wild	Canada, Canmore, Alberta — Dubé was killed while jogging with two friends on the Bench Trail. After an initial attack, Dubé climbed a tree while her friends sought help. The bear brought Dubé down from the tree and mauled her. Fish and wildlife officers shot and killed the bear. At the time of the attack, the trail was closed, and the public had been told to avoid it. A few days earlier, the bear had been relocated from Canmore to Banff National Park.
October 5, 2003	Timothy Treadwell, 46, male Amie Huguenard, 37, female	Wild	United States, Katmai National Park, Alaska — Treadwell and Huguenard's corpses were found by their pilot at Kaflia Bay. Treadwell was famous for his books and documentaries on living with wild bears in Alaska. State Troopers investigating the incident recovered an audiotape of the attack. The two were killed on the last night before their scheduled pickup after spending several months in the Alaskan bush. The attack is chronicled in the 2005 American documentary film Grizzly Man by German director Werner Herzog.
October 30, 2001	Timothy Hilston, 50, male	Wild	United States, near Ovando, Montana — Hilston was attacked while he field dressed an elk. A female bear and her cubs suspected in the attack were killed by U.S. Fish and Wildlife officials. Hilston's widow sued federal and state agencies for negligence, and the lawsuits were dismissed by District Court judge Donald W. Molloy.
July 14, 2000	George Tullos, 41, male	Wild	United States, Hyder, Alaska — Tullos' partially consumed body was found at a campground near the Canada–US border in Southeast Alaska. The bear was shot and killed.

== 1990s ==
=== Black bear ===
Date	Victim	Type	Location — Circumstances
August 14, 1997	Raymond Kitchen, 56, male Patti McConnell, 37, female	Wild	Canada, Liard River Hot Springs Provincial Park, British Columbia — McConnell died from injuries while defending herself and her 13-year-old son Kelly from a black bear attack on a boardwalk to the hot springs. Kitchen heard the attack in progress, and was killed while attempting to rescue. Kelly and a 20-year-old man were also injured. The bear was shot while standing over the victims. McConnell's son received a Star of Courage for his attempt to save his mother. Kitchen also received the honor, posthumously.
June 14, 1996	Sevend Satre, 53, male	Wild	Canada, near Tatlayoko Lake, British Columbia — Satre was killed while checking fence lines near the central British Columbia community of Tatlayoko Lake, British Columbia. Investigation showed that the bear, a healthy male, had stalked Satre and his horse, for over 0.5 mi (0.80 km) before attacking.
September 16, 1994	Ian Dunbar, 4, male	Wild	Canada, 70 Mile House, British Columbia — Dunbar was attacked in the back yard of his home. The bear was later killed by conservation officers.
August 10, 1993	Colin McClelland, 24, male	Wild	United States, Fremont County, Colorado — A bear tore open the door to McClelland's trailer and attacked him at Waugh Mountain, Colorado. The bear was later killed by game wardens.
July 8, 1992	Darcy Staver, 33, female	Wild	United States, Glennallen, Alaska — The bear entered her cabin and Staver and her husband fled to the roof. While Staver's husband went for help, the bear killed her. The bear was shot and killed by a neighbor.
June 14, 1992	Sébastien Lauzier, 20, male	Wild	Canada, near Cochrane, Ontario — Lauzier was attacked while taking soil samples. Lauzier's partner, Rod Barber, was able to drive off the bear with a pole and was not hurt. The incident occurred about 92 km (57 miles) northeast of Cochrane, just west of the Quebec border.
October 11, 1991	Raymond Jakubauskas, 32, male Carola Frehe, 48, female	Wild	Canada, Algonquin Provincial Park, Ontario — While they were setting up camp on Bates Island, a black bear broke both of their necks. The bear then dragged their bodies into the woods and consumed the remains. When police arrived five days later, the bear was guarding the bodies. A park naturalist called the attack "right off the scale of normal bear behavior".
May 26, 1991	James Waddell, 12, male	Wild	Canada, Lesser Slave Lake, Alberta — In the Marten River Campground, Waddell was dragged from a tent during the night and killed.

=== Brown bear ===
Date	Victim	Type	Location — Circumstances
November 1, 1999	Ned Rasmussen, 53, male	Wild	United States, Uganik Island, Alaska — After Rasmussen disappeared on a deer hunting trip, he was found dead.
May 25, 1999	Ken Cates, 53, male	Wild	United States, Kenai National Wildlife Refuge, Alaska — Cates was killed while hiking near Soldotna, Alaska in the Kenai National Wildlife Refuge. Troopers found Cates' rifle, spent shell casings, and blood nearby which suggested that Cates may have shot the bear.
October 24, 1998	George Evanoff, 65, male	Wild	Canada, near Prince George, British Columbia — Evanoff was hiking on the Bearpaw Ridge, 72 kilometres (45 mi) northeast of Prince George, British Columbia. He encountered a grizzly feeding on a moose kill about a half-mile (800 m) from his cabin. He was bitten on the neck, but his body was not mauled or eaten by the bear.
August 22, 1998	Christopher Kress, 40, male	Wild	Canada, near Beaver Mines, Alberta — Kress was killed by a grizzly bear while fishing on the South Castle River, near the Beaver Mines campground in Alberta.
May 17, 1998	Craig Dahl, 26, male	Wild	United States, Glacier National Park, Montana — Dahl's partially consumed remains were found three days after he set off to hike alone in the Two Medicine area of Glacier National Park. He was attacked by a mother and her two cubs.
February 8, 1998	Audelio Luis Cortes, 40, male	Wild	United States, near Kenai, Alaska — Cortes was killed immediately after being bitten in the head while laying seismic line in the Swanson River area. His crew walked past the bear's den.
August 23, 1996	Robert Bell, 33, male	Wild	United States, Gates of the Arctic National Park, Alaska — Bell was killed while hiking with a friend near the Kugrak river. They startled a mother bear feeding on salmon.
July 5, 1996	Christine Courtney, 32, female	Wild	Canada, Kluane National Park, Yukon — Courtney was killed while hiking on the Slim's Valley trail in Kluane National Park. Her husband was also attacked but survived. Park wardens killed the bear.
October 9, 1995	Shane Fumerton, 32, male Bill Caspell, 40, male	Wild	Canada, near Radium Hot Springs, British Columbia — Fumerton and Caspell were killed while securing an elk in the vicinity of Mount Soderhome, in the Southern Rocky Mountain Trench in southeastern British Columbia.
July 1, 1995	Marcie Trent, 77, female Larry Waldron, 45, male	Wild	United States, near Anchorage, Alaska — Trent and her son Waldron were killed by a bear defending a moose carcass while they were hiking on the McHugh Creek Trail in Chugach State Park, near Anchorage, Alaska.
October 3, 1992	John Petranyi, 40, male	Wild	United States, Glacier National Park, Montana — Petranyi was killed by a mother with two cubs on the Loop Trail, near the Granite Park Chalet.
September 15, 1992	Trevor Percy-Lancaster, 40, male	Wild	Canada, Jasper National Park, Alberta — Percy-Lancaster and his wife were setting up camp in an isolated area of the Tonquin Valley. They surprised a bear, and began running away. The bear initially caught Percy-Lancaster's wife, and then he distracted the bear, which turned on him.
July 10, 1992	Anton Bear, 6, male	Wild	United States, near King Cove, Alaska — The six-year-old, his mother, and sister were walking down a road when they were approached by a grizzly that had just been feeding at the town dump. The family fled, but the boy was chased down by the bear and killed. The bear devoured most of the victim before villagers could kill the animal.

=== Polar bear ===
Date	Victim	Type	Location — Circumstances
July 9, 1999	Hattie Amitnak, 64, female	Wild	Canada, near Rankin Inlet, Nunavut — Amitnak was mauled after trying to distract a bear that attacked and injured two other people at a Hudson Bay camp. She was later awarded a posthumous medal of bravery by then-Governor-General of Canada, Adrienne Clarkson.
December 8, 1990	Carl Stalker, 28, male	Wild	United States, Point Lay, Alaska — While Stalker was walking with his girlfriend, he was chased and consumed in the middle of the town. The bear was shot and killed near Stalker's corpse.

== 1980s ==
=== Black bear ===
Date	Victim	Type	Location — Circumstances
November 11, 1987	Grace Suzanne O'Rourke, 10, female	Wild	Canada, near DeBolt, Alberta — O'Rourke was killed when she dangled her legs inside a den that appeared to be unoccupied. A female bear inside was roused and attacked O'Rourke and her father when he attempted to rescue her. The bear was later shot by a neighbour.
May 29, 1985	Gordon Ray, 24, male	Wild	Canada, near Fort Nelson, British Columbia — Ray was killed while on a tree planting project approximately 45 kilometres (28 mi) south of Fort Nelson. He climbed a tree to avoid the bear, but fell, and was attacked. The bear was later shot by a helicopter pilot.
July 6, 1983	Daniel Anderson, 12, male	Wild	Canada, La Vérendrye Wildlife Reserve, Quebec — Anderson was grabbed from his tent while camping. His body was found 100 feet (30 m) from the tent.
May 27, 1983	Melvin Rudd, 55, male	Wild	Canada, near Nipawin Provincial Park, Saskatchewan — Rudd was killed while fishing in central Saskatchewan.
May 21, 1983	Clifford David Starblanket, 26, male	Wild	Canada, near Canwood, Saskatchewan — Starblanket, a trapper living in the forest, suffered an attack to his throat and head.
August 14, 1980	Lee Randal Morris, 44, male Carol Marshall, 24, female	Wild	Canada, near Zama City, Alberta — Morris and Marshall were killed by the same bear in separate attacks over a span of two hours. They were working at a remote oil drilling camp.
July 18, 1980	Allan Russell Baines, 10, male (Allan Russell Jones)	Wild	Canada, Leo Creek, near Granisle, British Columbia — The boy was killed on a fishing trip with friends. The other boys escaped unharmed. A 3-year-old male bear was shot a week later.

=== Brown bear ===
Date	Victim	Type	Location — Circumstances
November 4, 1988	Harley Seivenpiper, 40, male	Wild	United States, Port Alexander, Alaska — Seivenpiper was killed while hunting alone. The bear dragged Seivenpiper's body almost 1-mile (1.6 km) uphill to a cache. When searchers approached the cache, the bear charged, and was shot and killed.
October 5, 1988	David Alexander Hyde, 29, male	Wild	Canada, Chinchaga River, near Manning, Alberta — Hyde was marking trees for a forestry company when he was attacked by a grizzly bear as it defended its nearby food cache. The 270-kilogram bear was later shot when it charged a wildlife officer.
July 23, 1987	Gary Goeden, 29, male	Wild	United States, Glacier National Park, Montana — Goeden's partially consumed remains were found at Natahki Lake, Many Glacier Valley, Glacier National Park. He was on a solo hike, and off-trail.
April 25, 1987	Charles Gibbs, 40, male	Wild	United States, Glacier National Park, Montana — Gibbs was last seen alive following and photographing a bear with cubs at Elk Mountain in Glacier National Park. Investigators recovered film of the female approaching in attack mode at 50 yards (46 m).
October 5, 1986	William Tesinsky, 38, male	Wild	United States, Yellowstone National Park, Wyoming — Tesinkey, a photographer, was mauled after approaching a bear in the Otter Creek area of Hayden Valley, Yellowstone National Park. The bear was killed.
July 30, 1984	Brigitta Fredenhagen, 25, female	Wild	United States, Yellowstone National Park, Wyoming — Fredenhagen was dragged from her tent during the night and killed at a backcountry campsite at the southern end of White Lake in Yellowstone National Park.
June 25, 1983	Roger May, 23, male	Wild	United States, Gallatin National Forest, Montana — May was dragged from his tent and eaten at the Rainbow Point campground, northwest of Yellowstone National Park. The bear was captured and killed with an injection of poison.
July 30/31, 1981	George Peter Doerksen, 41, male	Wild	Canada, Liard River Hot Springs Provincial Park, British Columbia — While camping alone near the public campground, Doerksen was killed by a grizzly bear. Authorities believed he surprised the bear in the night when it approached his car. A grizzly bear and black bear were later spotted near the campsite; the black bear was shot and killed, but the grizzly was lost and never located.
September 30, 1980	Laurence Gordon, 33, male	Wild	United States, Glacier National Park, Montana — Gordon was killed at the Elizabeth Lake campsite in the Belly River Valley, Glacier National Park.
August 24, 1980	Ernest Cohoe, 38, male	Wild	Canada, near Banff, Alberta — While fishing with a friend just north of Banff, Alberta, a bear charged and bit off part of Cohoe's face. He died a week later as a result of the injuries.
July 24, 1980	Jane Ammerman, 19, female Kim Eberly, 19, male	Wild	United States, Glacier National Park, Montana — The partially consumed bodies of Ammerman and Eberly were found near their campsite at Divide Creek in the St. Mary Valley. The bear was later killed by hunters from nearby Blackfeet Nation.

=== Polar bear ===
Date	Victim	Type	Location — Circumstances
May 19, 1987	Juan Perez, 11, male	Captive	United States, Brooklyn, New York City, New York — Perez was killed by two bears after climbing a fence in Prospect Park Zoo, Brooklyn, New York. The bears were killed by police officers.
November 29, 1983	Thomas Mutanen, 46, male	Wild	Canada, Churchill, Manitoba — Mutanen was attacked and dragged on a street in Churchill. The bear was part of an annual migration to Hudson Bay. Due to a lack of ice on the bay, the bear wandered into the town.
September 27, 1982	Conrado Mones, 29, male	Captive	United States, New York City — Mones was mauled after climbing three fences in New York City's Central Park Zoo to enter the bear's pen.

== 1970s ==
=== Black bear ===
Date	Victim	Type	Location — Circumstances
July 2, 1978	Lynn Orser, 30, female	Captive	Canada, King, Ontario — A bear trained to wrestle humans entered the home of its owner, professional wrestler Dave McKigney, and attacked and killed McKigney's friend, Orser, in her bedroom.
May 13, 1978	George Halfkenny, 16, male Mark Halfkenny, 12, male Billy Rhindress, 15, male	Wild	Main article: 1978 Algonquin Provincial Park bear attack Canada, Algonquin Provincial Park, Ontario — The three boys were stalked and killed while fishing near Radiant Lake in Algonquin Provincial Park. This was the first fatal bear attack in the park in eighty years.
August 28, 1976	Janice Laybourne, 29, female	Wild	Canada, near Fairview, Alberta — Laybourne was mauled while picking berries near her farm. A 58 kg (128 lb) female bear and her two 14 kg (30 lb) cubs were spotted near the site two days later. All three were shot.
August 12, 1975	Mary Ann Johns, 1, female	Captive	United States, Stewardson, Illinois — While carnival workers were setting up, a bear was taken out of its cage and chained to a tree. Johns, whose parents were carnival workers, walked by and was attacked. The bear had previously attacked children.
May 16, 1974	Victoria Valdez, 4, female	Wild	United States, Glenwood, Washington — Valdez was mauled while playing near her home. Her body was found 200 yards (180 m) from her home. Her father shot and killed a 250-pound (110 kg) bear before finding his daughter's body.
July 25, 1971	John Richardson, 31, male	Wild	United States, near Rocky Mountain National Park, Colorado — Richardson was attacked while camping on private property, just west of Rocky Mountain National Park, and north of Grand Lake. The bear was later killed by a professional hunter. This was the first fatal black bear attack in Colorado in modern times.

=== Brown bear ===
Date	Victim	Type	Location — Circumstances
September 15, 1979	Monty Adams, 32, male	Wild	Canada, near Pincher Creek, Alberta — While hunting alone for sheep west of Pincher Creek in Southern Alberta, Adams was mauled by a grizzly bear. Adams was found by two other hunters, and died when rescuers were removing him from the area.
July 1, 1977	Alison Muser, 5, female	Wild	Canada, Waterton Lakes National Park, Alberta — Muser was mauled to death by a black colored Grizzly Bear while playing with her sister near Cameron Creek in Waterton Lakes National Park. She died en route to a Calgary hospital. The family had just recently moved to Canada from South Africa and was unaware of the danger posed by bears. The family threatened legal action against the park for failing to provide warnings of the dangers posed by the animals. The bear responsible for the attack was killed.
September 23, 1976	Mary Pat Mahoney, 22, female	Wild	United States, Glacier National Park, Montana — Mahoney was dragged from a tent and killed at Many Glacier campground. Rangers killed two grizzly bears in the area a few hours after the attack.
September 11, 12 or 13, 1976; exact date unknown	Alan Precup, 25, male	Wild	United States, Glacier Bay National Park and Preserve, Alaska — Precup did not return after backpacking in Glacier Bay National Park and Preserve. Days later, searchers found his campsite with his bare skeleton, one intact hand, and both feet still booted.
July 24, 1976	Barbara Chapman, 24, female	Wild	Canada, Glacier National Park, British Columbia — While hiking with a friend in British Columbia's Glacier National Park, Chapman rounded a bend to find a grizzly bear charging. The bear first attacked Chapman's friend, who initially resisted, but left him alone after he played dead. The bear then attacked Chapman, who fought back and was quickly killed. Chapman's friend sustained serious injuries, but was able to hike out for help. The grizzly bear that attacked and her three cubs were soon found and killed.
August 3, 1974	Jay Reeves, 38, male	Wild	United States, Izembek National Wildlife Refuge, Alaska — Reeves was camping alone on the Alaskan Peninsula, near Cold Bay. A fisherman discovered a camp that looked like it was damaged by a bear, and found only Reeves' shoes. A helicopter spotted and shot a grizzly bear near the camp. Later, they found Reeves' bones, and an autopsy on the bear revealed human remains.
September 25, 1973	Wilf Etherington, 51, male	Wild	Canada, Banff National Park, Alberta — Etherington, a biologist with the Canadian Wildlife Service, and a photographer were helping with the relocation of a troublesome grizzly bear in Banff National Park. The bear had been recently trapped and sedated. When the two men approached the bear, it charged and attacked Etherington.
June 25, 1972	Harry Walker, 25, male	Wild	United States, Yellowstone National Park, Wyoming Walker was attacked by a bear that was feeding on food that was left out at his campsite near Old Faithful Inn.
January 14, 1970	Harvey Cardinal, 48, male	Wild	Canada, near Fort St. John, British Columbia — Cardinal was attacked and partially eaten while hunting near the Doig River. The bear had a gum infection, and was shot and killed.

=== Polar bear ===
Date	Victim	Type	Location — Circumstances
August 26, 1976	Lafayette Herbert, 43, male	Captive	United States, Baltimore, Maryland — Herbert, who had a history of mental illness, was killed after he climbed into the polar bear enclosure at the Baltimore Zoo.
January 5, 1975	Richard Pernitzky, 18, male	Wild	Canada, Inuvik, Northwest Territories — Pernitzky was mauled at an Imperial Oil exploration site. The bear was later shot and killed.
January 19, 1972	Richard Hale, 19, male	Captive	United States, Toledo, Ohio — Hale's body was found at the bottom of the polar bear grotto at the Toledo Zoo. There was evidence that Hale was under the influence of drugs at the time of his attack.

== 1960s ==
=== Black bear ===
Date	Victim	Type	Location — Circumstances
October 1, 1968	Jack Ottertail, 53, male	Wild	Canada, near Atikokan, Ontario — Ottertail was killed while on a walk. A bear found near the body was shot and killed.
August 8, 1967	Susan Duckitt, 11, female	Wild	Canada, near Okanagan Landing, British Columbia — Duckitt and a friend were picnicking by Okanagan Lake. They went on a walk up a hill and encountered the bear standing on its hind feet. The girls ran away, and Duckitt was caught. A man tracked down the bear and killed it with six shots.
September 7, 1966	Phyllis Tremper, 3, female	Captive	United States, Prescott, Arizona — A pet bear dragged Tremper into its cage at the Ponderosa Trailer Park in Prescott, Arizona. The bear's owner shot and killed it.
June 26, 1965	Vernon Sauvola, 50, male	Wild	United States, Aitkin, Minnesota — The report claims Sauvola was attacked while he was fishing in a stream, and his body was dragged 60 feet (18 m). Mr. Sauvola was not found for five days, so substantial decomposition had occurred. It is unclear as to whether a bear actually attacked Mr. Sauvola or if a bear scavenged on the body after he died from another cause based on the visual evidence at the scene.
September 17, 1964	Sidney Smith, 26, male	Wild	Canada, near Schefferville, Quebec — Smith, a technician on a radar line, was attacked by a black bear in a remote area. There was evidence that Smith tried to defend himself with a hunting knife.
August 16, 1963	William Strandberg, 51, male	Wild	United States, near Fairbanks, Alaska — A bear killed Strandberg approximately 160 miles (260 km) west of Fairbanks. Strandberg was a member of a prominent Alaskan mining family.

=== Brown bear ===
Date	Victim	Type	Location — Circumstances
March 31, 1969	Russell Ringer, 49, male	Captive	United States, Fort Leonard Wood, Missouri — Ringer was crushed by his pet bear, which had no teeth or claws, as he entered its cage for a wrestling match at the military base.
August 13, 1967	Julie Helgeson, 19, female	Wild	United States, Glacier National Park, Montana — While camping near the Granite Park Chalet, Helgeson was dragged from her tent. Her boyfriend was also severely mauled. This incident became widely known as "Night of the Grizzlies" when two young women were separately attacked in Glacier National Park, Montana, by grizzly bears.
August 13, 1967	Michele Koons, 19, female	Wild	United States, Glacier National Park, Montana — Koons was camping with a group at the Trout Lake campsite. A bear invaded their camp, and while other campers climbed trees, Koons was caught in her sleeping bag and killed. This incident became widely known as "Night of the Grizzlies" when two young women were separately attacked in Glacier National Park, Montana, by grizzly bears. Although Helgeson and Koons were killed on the same night, these were separate attacks by different bears approximately 9 miles (14 km) apart. Both bears were killed two nights after their attacks.

=== Polar bear ===
Date	Victim	Type	Location — Circumstances
November 17, 1968	Paulosie Meeko, 19, male	Wild	Canada, Churchill, Manitoba — Meeko's throat was slashed by a polar bear, and he died less than two hours after the attack. The bear was shot by the police.

== 1950s ==
=== Black bear ===
Date	Victim	Type	Location — Circumstances
September 6, 1959	Lyndon Hooper, 51, male	Wild	Canada, near Cadomin, Alberta — Hooper was fishing alone when attacked 20 miles (32 km) from Cadomin, Alberta. His mutilated body was found in a stream. Three days later, a forest ranger shot a bear .5 miles (0.80 km) from where Hooper's body was recovered. It was later discovered that the bear's stomach contained human hair.
August 12, 1958	Barbara Coates, 7, female	Wild	Canada, Jasper National Park, Alberta — While Coates was picking berries outside of her family's Sunwapta Falls cottage, a black bear appeared. Coates ran to the cottage, but the bear chased and mauled her.
August 11, 1953	Andrew Mark Palmer, 3, male	Captive	United States, Flagstaff, Arizona — While Palmer was playing with his grandparents' pet bear, he was mauled. The bear was shot and killed by a neighbor.
November 19, 1952	Rudolph Gaier, 50, male	Wild	United States, near Anchorage, Alaska — Gaier and a black bear were found dead at a remote mountain cabin. An investigator concluded that Gaier shot the bear after it entered his cabin, and before dying, the bear fatally clawed Gaier.
September 19, 1952	Robert Huckins, 18, male	Captive	United States, Crawford Notch State Park, New Hampshire — After feeding a bear in its cage, Huckins was chased and killed. The bear also injured three other people, and was eventually shot and killed with thirteen gun shots.

=== Brown bear ===
Date	Victim	Type	Location — Circumstances
October 27, 1958	Sam Adams, 45, male	Wild	United States, near Ovando, Montana — Adams was missing after hunting near the Continental Divide northeast of Missoula. His rifle was found smashed in three parts. Laboratory studies showed evidence that Adams was in a fight with the bear, which was described as "probably a grizzly".
October 22, 1956	Kenneth Scott, 29, male	Wild	United States, near Augusta, Montana — While elk hunting, a hunter in Scott's group was attacked, and the bear was shot and wounded. When they went back to kill the bear, Scott's gun jammed and the bear mauled him. The bear was later killed by another hunter.
October 9, 1956	Paul Lemery, 28, male	Captive	United States, Libertyville, Illinois — Lemery, an animal trainer, was attacked when taking a bear out of its cage. He was preparing for a television appearance with the bear.
April 16, 1956	Lloyd Pennington, 56, male Everett Kendall, 53, male	Wild	United States, Chitina, Copper River Census Area, Alaska — The two men were hunting and spotted a bear den near Snowshoe Lake and attempted to lure the bear out, assuming it was weak and hungry, when it came out and killed them. A rescue team shot and killed the bear when it refused to back away.
September 19, 1955	Willis McBride, 28, male	Wild	United States, near Eureka, Alaska — McBride was mauled while hunting alone. The bear was not found.

== 1940s ==
=== Black bear ===
Date	Victim	Type	Location — Circumstances
July 7, 1948	Carol Ann Pomeranky, 3, female	Wild	United States, Marquette National Forest, Michigan — Pomeranky was taken by a bear outside of her home on the Marquette National Forest (now the Hiawatha National Forest) in Michigan. She was dragged 100 yards (91 m). The bear was tracked and killed.
August 2, 1945	Anton Rauch, 59, male	Captive	United States, Chicago, Illinois — Rauch, a worker at the Lincoln Park Zoo, was attacked while cleaning the bear's cage.
November 23, 1943	Carl Herrick, 37, male	Wild	United States, West Townshend, Vermont — Herrick was hunting in West Townshend, Vermont, and his body was found with a blackened face and scratches. His rifle and bear tracks were nearby. A theory is that Herrick shot the bear and thought it was dead, and was squeezed to death when he approached.

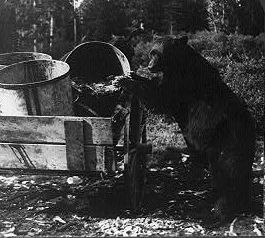
A black bear searching garbage pails in Yellowstone National Park, c. 1905. Bear attacks on humans led to changes in park's garbage management procedures.

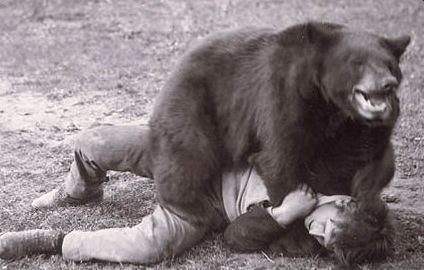
A man wrestling with a trained bear. There have been instances of bears killing their trainers.

=== Brown bear ===
Date	Victim	Type	Location — Circumstances
September 10, 1945	Richard Strand, 8, male	Captive	United States, Seattle, Washington — Strand was attacked while playing with a pet bear. The bear also bit a neighbor who attempted to rescue Strand. The bear was taken to Woodland Park Zoo.
December 11, 1942	Richard Havemann, 68, male	Captive	United States, San Diego, California — Havemann, an animal trainer, was attacked by a Himalayan brown bear at the San Diego Zoo.
August 23, 1942	Martha Hansen, 45, female	Wild	United States, Yellowstone National Park, Wyoming — Hansen left her cabin to go to the restroom. As she rounded a corner, she surprised a bear and was mauled. Hansen was taken to the hospital and died four days later due to injuries sustained during the attack. Hansen's sister sought, and eventually successfully received compensation for expenses incurred to care for Martha. U.S. President Franklin D. Roosevelt signed a bill in 1944 granting the family $1894.95.
June 14, 1941	Thomas Miller, 28, male	Captive	United States, Detroit, Michigan — Miller, a carnival employee, was struck on his head by a bear from Canada. The attack occurred when Miller took the bear out of its cage to perform tricks for his wife.

=== Polar bear ===
Date	Victim	Type	Location — Circumstances
October 10, 1942	Jean-Paul Bédard, 29, male	Captive	Canada, Jardin Zoologique de Québec, Québec — Bédard, who took care of the three bears, attempted to direct them toward a cave that led to an alternate cage by hitting the floor with a broom. Two bears were in a corner, and one was in a pool in the exhibit. The bear in the pool jumped out onto Bédard's back, overpowering and mauling him. Another keeper responded and shot the three bears. Although he was grievously wounded, Bédard managed to survive and gesture for a few minutes, doing his final penance. Bédard had repeatedly been ordered to stay out of the bears' enclosure when they were in it and to carry a firearm if he did have to enter.

== 1930s ==
=== Black bear ===
Date	Victim	Type	Location — Circumstances
October 15, 1936	George Langley, 55, male, James Virtue, 68, male	Captive	United States, Ellsworth, Maine — Langley owned a gas station where he kept the bear. After entering the bear's cage to feed it, Langley and his helper were attacked. The bear was shot and killed.
November 11, 1934	Clarence Staley, 54, male	Captive	United States, Mankato, Minnesota — Staley was mauled by a bear that he had raised from a cub. The caged bear attacked Staley when he tried to retrieve a purse that had been dropped inside the bear's cage.
November 11, 1934	William Thomas "Bill" Brown Jr, 64, male	Captive	United States, Pecos County, Texas — Brown was killed while trying to recapture a bear from his roadside zoo. A posse shot and killed the bear.
October 2, 1933	Grant Taylor, 11, male	Captive	United States, Brookhaven, New York — On his walk home from school, Taylor stopped to feed an apple to a bear tethered in front of an inn. The bear mauled Taylor and crushed him against a wire cage. Motorists stopped and used sticks and stones to try to separate the bear from Taylor. Eventually, a man operating a nearby roadside stand came and shot and killed the bear. An examination revealed that the bear hadn't eaten in two days. The Inn had two bears that were trapped five years previously in the Adirondacks, and were frequently fed by passers-by. Both bears were killed.
October 9, 1932	Peter Matthew Ryan, 5, male	Captive	United States, Albion, New York — Ryan was attacked after trying to get a close look at a pet bear. The bear was tied to a fence at Mount Albion Cemetery after a truck transporting it broke down.
June 2, 1930	Emerson Joyce, 60, male	Captive	United States, Watertown, New York — A female black bear who recently had her cubs taken away killed her feeder, Joyce. This occurred at the John C. Thompson Park Zoo.

=== Brown bear ===
Date	Victim	Type	Location — Circumstances
July 18, 1934	Charles Wyman, 76, male	Captive	United States, Denver, Colorado — Wyman, a zookeeper, was attacked by two grizzly bears at the Denver Zoo after spraying them with a water hose. It was speculated that the bears were in a foul mood due to warm weather. The bears were shot.
October 1932	John Macdonald, 70, male	Wild	Canada, near Dawson, Yukon — Macdonald's mutilated body was initially found in the wilderness 20 miles (32 km) north of Dawson. Macdonald's corpse was moved to a cabin, and before the police arrived, the bear broke into the cabin and scattered the remains. Macdonald was a woodcutter who lived alone in a shack on the Yukon River.
July 8, 1932	Thomas Earl, 56, male	Captive	United States, Cleveland, Ohio — Earl, a zookeeper at the Cleveland Brookside Zoo, was mauled by a brown bear when feeding it in its pen. After a vicious struggle, police shot the bear. Earl was also mistakenly shot, but it was determined that he was already dead. Earlier in the day, Earl had been fired from his job.

=== Polar bear ===
Date	Victim	Type	Location — Circumstances
July 3, 1939	Dr. Joseph Germain, 53, male	Captive	Canada, Jardin Zoologique de Québec, Québec — Germain, the director of the Sanitary Unit of Rimouski, visiting the Jardin with his family, tried to make the two polar bears come closer by throwing them peanuts and talking to them while reaching into the cage with his right hand. One of the bears bit his right wrist and dragged him near the cage. Next, one of the bears ripped off his right arm, while the other ripped his left arm and mauled his left thigh, making him scream. According to medical doctors, he then fainted, briefly woke back up, then died.

== 1920s ==
=== Black bear ===
Date	Victim	Type	Location — Circumstances
August 29, 1929	Olga Gregorchuk, <10, female	Wild	Canada, near Lac Du Bonnet, Manitoba — Gregorchuk was minding her four-year-old brother, Bill Gregorchuk, while their parents were out working the farm. A large 190 kg (420 lb) black bear chased Olga and her brother into their family's farm house where it knocked the door in, attacked Olga, dragged her out and ate her. By the time her body was found, it had been consumed with the exception of her head. A small gravestone in Red Deer Cemetery, Manitoba, describes the death.

=== Brown bear ===
Date	Victim	Type	Location — Circumstances
October 16, 1929	Jack Thayer, 31, male	Wild	United States, Admiralty Island, Alaska — Thayer, a U.S. Forest Service employee, and Fred Herring, an assistant, encountered a brown bear at close range while conducting a timber survey on southeast Admiralty Island. Thayer shot the bear while Herring retreated to a tree, but the wounded bear mauled Thayer, who died later that evening.
September 12, 1929	Percy Goodair, 52, male	Wild	Canada, Jasper National Park, Alberta — Goodair, a Parks Canada warden, was killed by a bear while patrolling the Tonquin Valley.
June 12, 1922	Joseph B. "Frenchy" Duret, 60, male	Wild	United States, Absaroka-Beartooth Wilderness, Montana — Duret was attacked and partially devoured by a huge grizzly. Duret crawled 1.5-mile (2.4 km) back towards his ranch and died in Frenchy Meadow on Slough Creek.

== 1910s ==
=== Brown bear ===
Date	Victim	Type	Location	Location — Circumstances
September 8, 1916	Frank Welch, 61, male	Wild	Yellowstone National Park, Wyoming	Welch was killed at a camp near Sylvan Pass while carrying a load of hay and oats. Men from the camp killed the bear with a dynamite trap.
Unknown date prior to February 1914	Alleged Bear attack	Wild	Helena, Montana	On February 14, 1914, in the mountains at Jackson's creek 10 miles (16 km) south of Helena, Montana, a prospector named Pierce reported he found the skeleton of a bear with a bullet wound in its skull along with the skeleton of a dog and faded bits of a woman's dress. Pierce did not find a body of a woman, but he speculated a female berry picker had shot the bear after it had torn the woman's clothing and that the dog died after attacking the bear. Recent snowfall prevented Pierce from looking for any human remains. This story was reprinted in a longer version as "Woman Killed in Battle With Bear" by other newspapers.

=== Polar bear ===
Date	Victim	Type	Location	Location — Circumstances
September 1913	Unknown Inuk	Wild	Canada, Napartok Bay, Newfoundland and Labrador	An Inuk was dragged off by a polar bear while asleep in his canoe. His friend with whom he was sleeping warned nearby hunters, who chased the polar bear and killed it, but not before the bear had killed the Inuk.

== 1900s ==
=== Black bear ===
Date	Victim	Type	Location	Location — Circumstances
October 5, 1908	Baby Laird, 1, ?	Captive	Tucson, Arizona	After a bear escaped from a cage at Elysian Grove Pleasure Park, Buss Laird ran with her infant child in a go-cart. The bear grabbed and killed the baby.
November 24, 1906	John Dicht, 18, male	Wild	Elk County, Pennsylvania	Thinking the bear was dead, Dicht began skinning it. The bear immediately awoke and tore off one of Dicht's arms, and then killed him.
May 19, 1901	Mary Porterfield, 3, female Willie Porterfield, 5, male Henry Porterfield, 7, male	Wild	Job, West Virginia	The children were gathering flowers near their home when they were attacked. A member of a search party found the remains of the children, and shot and killed the bear.

== 1890s ==
=== Brown bear ===
Date	Victim	Type	Location	Location — Circumstances
September 2, 1892	Phillip Henry Vetter, 37, male	Wild	Near Greybull River, Wyoming	Vetter, a buffalo hunter, had stated to a fellow hunter a week before, that "he would be going out for some bear." A week later, another hunter seeking shelter from rain, investigated his cabin, which had been ransacked by a grizzly bear, and found Vetter dead in the cabin. A newspaper was found which had been written on in blood by Vetter before his death, describing his battle with a grizzly bear, and ending with the words "I'm dying." The hunter and another man, searched for signs of the bear, and found Vetter's hat, two empty rifle casings, and his rifle with a cartridge jammed in its chamber. Vetter was buried in Old Trail Town, Cody, Wyoming.
June 24, 1892	Hyrum Conrad Naegle, 22, male	Wild	Colonia Pacheco, Chihuahua, Mexico	Naegle and his brother George shot and wounded a Mexican grizzly bear which they pursued, thinking it would soon expire. While George was repairing his rifle, Naegle went to finish the bear but was mauled. George shot the bear dead, but Hyrum died two days later in the hospital from infection.

== 1880s ==
=== Black bear ===
Date	Victim	Type	Location	Location — Circumstances
September 4, 1883	Frank Devereaux, 52, male	Wild	Cheboygan, Michigan	Devereaux and the bear's corpses were found in the woods. There were indications that the bear and man fought each other. Although the article does not mention the species of bear, it is assumed to be a black bear, as this is the only species native to Michigan.
December 29, 1883	John Robinson, ?, male	Wild	Wilkes-Barre, Pennsylvania	Robinson's dead body was found near train tracks. There was evidence of bear tracks and a "terrible struggle".
June 1881	John Dennison, 82, male	Wild	Algonquin Provincial Park, Ontario	This was Ontario's first recorded fatal black bear attack. Dennison was inspecting his bear traps on Lake Opeongo, in what is now part of Algonquin Park. After discovering a bear caught in the trap a struggle between the two ensued, ending in both their deaths.

=== Grizzly bear ===
Date	Victim	Type	Location	Location — Circumstances
June 1886	"Old Ike," ?, male	Wild	Salmon River, Idaho	One of the most successful bear hunters, he killed over 100 grizzlies during the 1800s. In June 1886, he wounded a grizzly bear near the headwaters of the Salmon River, but not enough to cripple the animal. After pursuing it into a dense stand of trees, he was attacked by the bear and mauled, with the bear biting into his chest—crushing his entire chest with one bite. The bear was driven off by his companions.
July 1885	Richard Wilson, ?, male	Wild	Sedona, Arizona	A bear hunter, Wilson was hunting grizzly bears and shot one near Oak Creek, Arizona. He followed the bear into a thicket and was attacked. He tried to escape by climbing a tree, but the bear pulled him down and killed him.
October 19, 1883	William Robbins, 29, male	Wild	Pagosa Springs, Colorado	While out hunting, Robbins made an abrupt turn around a blind corner and surprised a grizzly bear standing erect. The bear struck him in the abdomen with his paw, completely disemboweling him. The fatally wounded Robbins was able to stumble back to his hunting camp and tell his companions what happened before dropping dead.

== 1870s ==
=== Brown bear ===
Date	Victim	Type	Location	Location — Circumstances
1875	William White Waddell, 57, male	Wild	Big Basin Redwoods State Park, California	Waddell, a lumber mill owner, was killed near Waddell Creek in Santa Cruz County, California.

== 1860s ==
=== Brown bear ===
Date	Victim	Type	Location	Circumstances
August 30, 1863	Charles Henry Gates, 35, male	Wild	Cache County, Utah	Gates was fatally mauled while hunting a grizzly bear that escaped from a trap. In 2004, descendants of Gates placed a new headstone at his gravesite.

== 1850s ==
=== Brown bear ===
Date	Victim	Type	Location	Circumstances
1855	John "Grizzly" Adams, 48, male	Wild	Sierra Nevada, California	A professional trapper and trainer of wild animals, he was badly injured, dislodging his scalp and leaving a large hole in his head. He died in 1860 from complications of his scalp wound.
December 19, 1854	Andrew Whitley "Andy" Sublette, 46, male	Wild	Santa Monica, California	An experienced bear hunter who hunted and killed many bears, Sublette shot and wounded a bear after being separated from his hunting party near present-day Santa Monica in 1854. He was then mauled but stabbed the bear to death with his knife and with the help of his dog. His dog survived, but Sublette died seven days later owing to his injuries.
October 27, 1854	Isaac Slover, 68, male	Wild	Mount San Antonio, California	A trapper and hunter who hunted grizzly bears even in his old age, Slover shot and wounded one on Mount San Antonio near his cabin. The large wounded bear crawled into the brush, and Slover reloaded and followed, whereupon he was attacked. He died 3 days later.
1850	Fielding Isaccs	Wild	Rocky Mountains	Fielding was found with his skull crushed in a 1300lb grizzly's mouth with his knife broken in the grizzly's neck/shoulder and both deceased. Col. William Smith a.k.a. "Rebel Bill" wrote an autobiography and detailed the incident in that autobiography.

== 1830s ==
=== Brown bear ===
Date	Victim	Type	Circumstances
October 17, 1837	Peter Lebeck, male	Wild	United States, Fort Tejon, California — Lebeck was out hunting grizzlies. He dispatched one with a well-placed shot and, assuming it to be dead, approached it. However, the bear rallied and lunged, throwing him to the ground and breaking his neck. He was killed instantly, but the bear was later killed by Native American hunters.

== 1780s ==
=== Black bear ===
Date	Victim	Type	Circumstances
August 1784	"Son of Mr. Leach," 8, male	Wild	United States, Moultonborough, New Hampshire — The child was sent to a pasture with a horse and was attacked by a three-year-old bear. Leach, on arrival finding the bear holding his son by the throat, struck the bear with a stake. The bear withdrew, dragging the boy with him. A search was mounted the next day, and the corpse of the boy was discovered partially devoured. The bear rose from behind a nearby log and was killed by three gunshots.

== Maps ==
Locations of fatal bear attacks in Canada
Gold: Wild brown bears
Black:Wild black bears
Green:Wild polar bears
Blue: Captive bears (all species)
Locations of fatal bear attacks in the contiguous United States
Gold: Wild brown bears
Black: Wild black bears
Blue: Captive bears (all species, including polar bears)
Locations of fatal bear attacks in Alaska
Gold: Wild brown bears
Black: Wild black bears
Green: Wild polar bears

== See also ==
- Bear attacks
- Bear danger
- Binky (polar bear)
- Stephen Herrero
- 2011 Svalbard polar bear attack

Lists of fatal animal attacks

- List of fatal cougar attacks in North America
- List of fatal alligator attacks in the United States
- Coyote attacks on humans
- List of wolf attacks in North America
- Fatal dog attacks in the United States
