= Peter Lebeck =

Early settler of Kern County, California

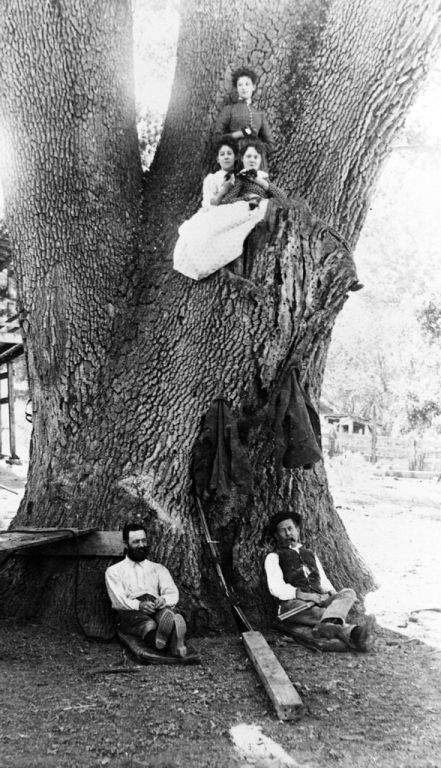
- The tree under which Peter Lebeck was buried, and where his epitaph was carved, in an 1890 photograph
- Died: 17 October 1837; Tehachapi Mountains
- Occupation: Possibly a trapper

Peter Lebeck (died 17 October 1837, sometimes written Lebec or Lebecque) was an early settler of Kern County, California. The only certain information known about him is that he was killed by a bear, probably a California grizzly, and buried underneath a valley oak in 1837. The tree he was buried under is known as the Peter Lebeck Oak. He is attested only by his grave marker, now at Fort Tejon, but the unknown circumstances of his identity and death have cemented his position in the culture of the San Joaquin Valley. He represents the earliest known victim of a bear attack in California.

== Background ==
=== Historical ===
Modern-day California in the 1830s was part of the Mexican state of Alta California, initially half of the Spanish province of Las Californias (along with Baja California.) Europeans first made contact with coastal California in 1542, but the inner Tulare Valley was not explored until 1776. Anglo-Americans began to enter the area in 1826. The lower Central Valley was still politically dominated by Yokuts-speaking people.

=== Brown bears in California ===
The California grizzly bear (Ursus arctos horribilis) is an extinct population of the brown bear which was formerly common across California. It was larger and more aggressive than the extant black bear. Adult grizzlies do not climb trees effectively and respond to threats by standing their ground and warding off their attackers.

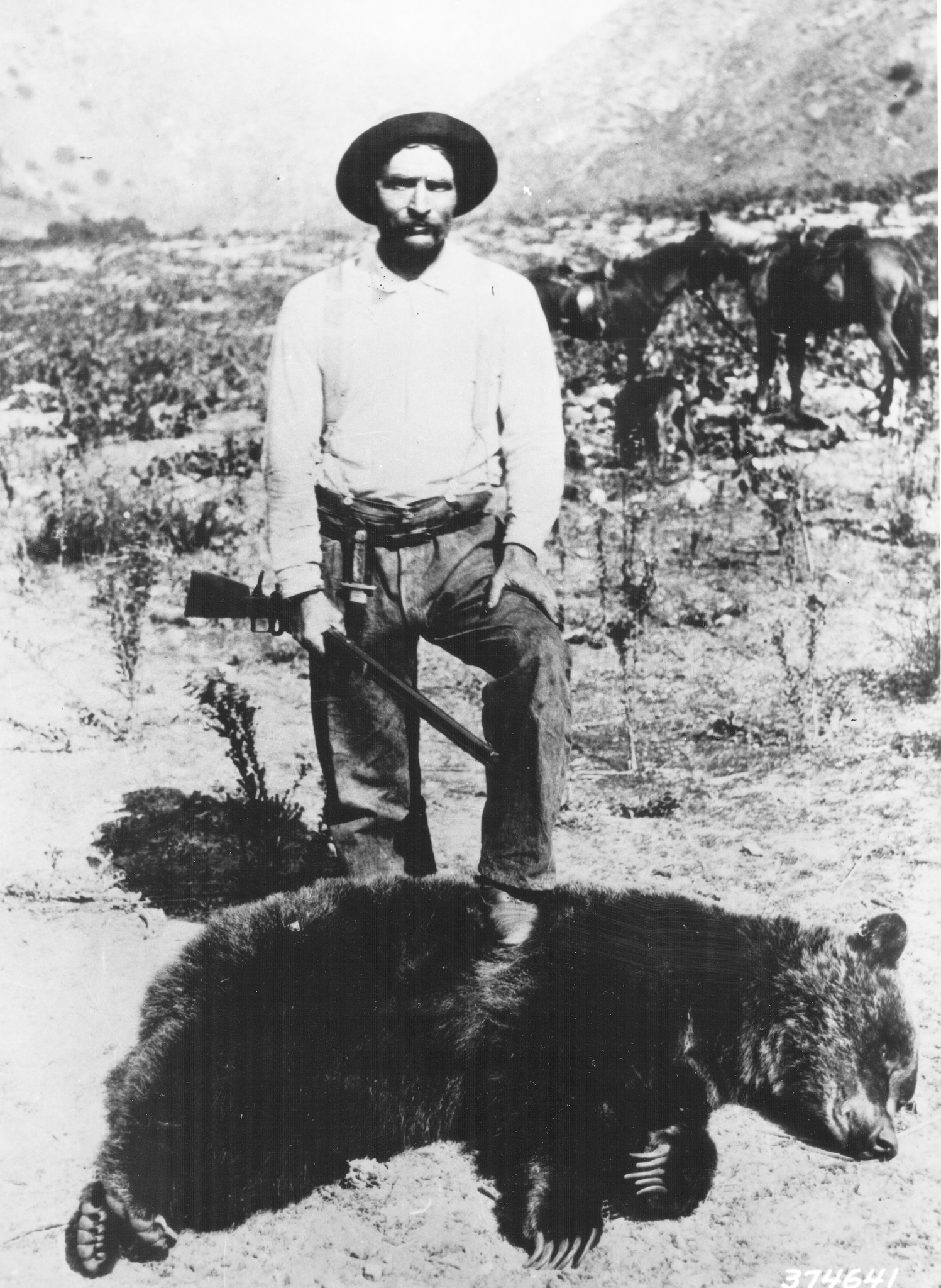
A California grizzly bear shot in 1916.

== Biography ==
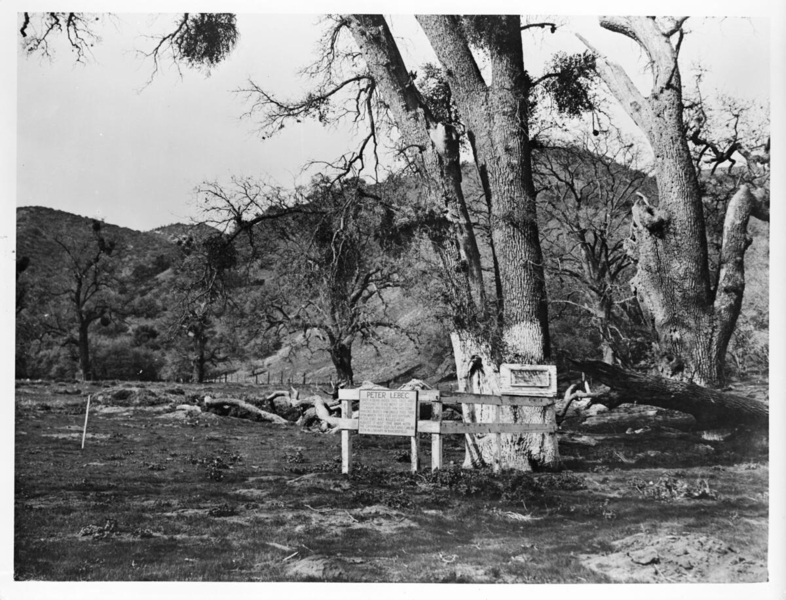
The Peter Lebeck Oak, as it stood in the early 20th century

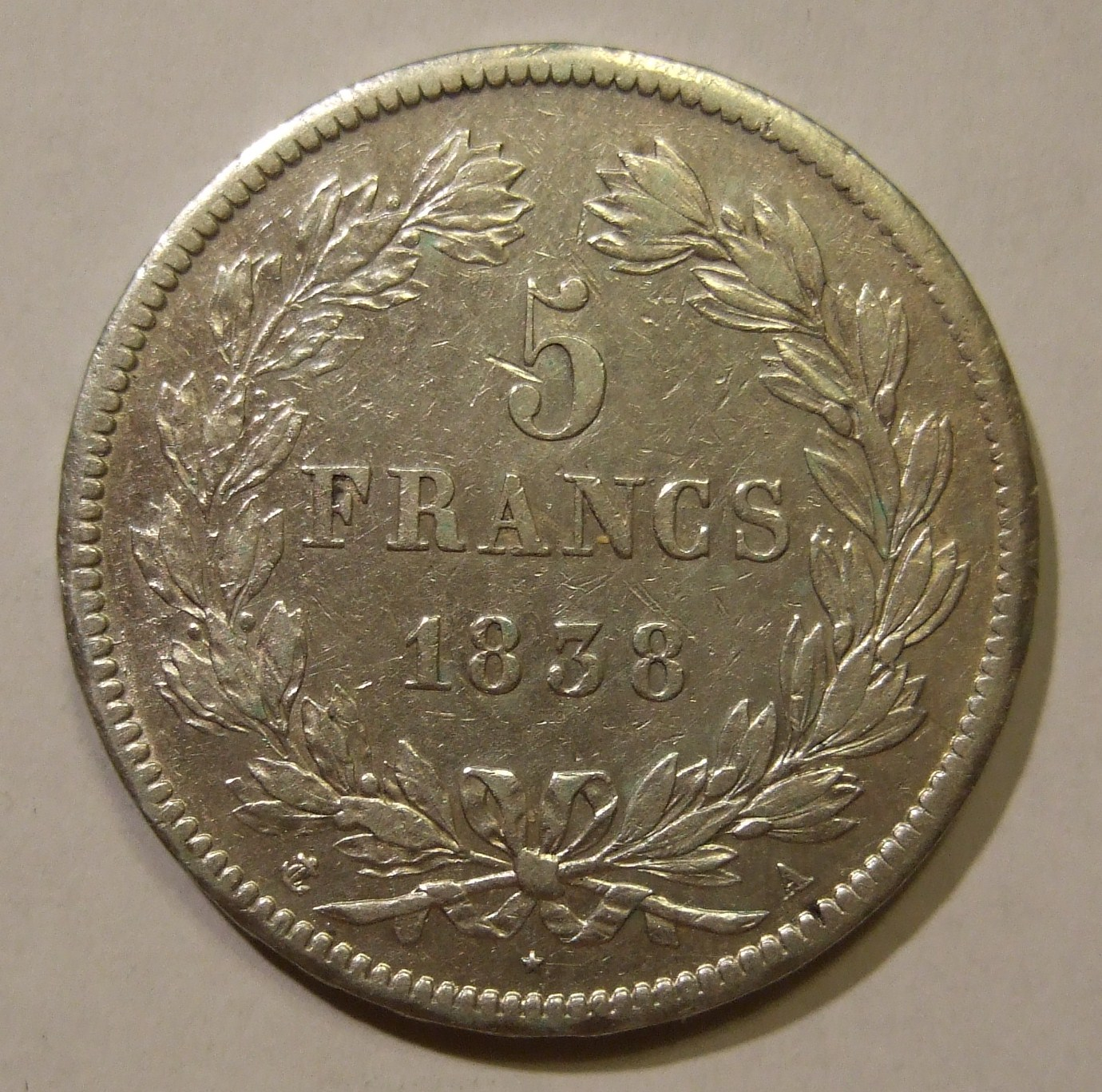
An 1838 franc, of a similar type found at Fort Tejon and popularly connected to Lebeck

Lebeck may have been a Catholic French-Canadian trapper of the Hudson's Bay Company—judging by the Catholic-style Christogram seen on his grave—granted by the Governor of California to hunt in the Tulare Valley. The only primary source for his life is the epitaph, reading:

IHS + PETER LEBECK KILLED BY A x BEAR OCT^{R} 17 1837

The bear in question has been identified as a California grizzly, as early European-American settlers in California referred to brown bears as "x bears" due to the pattern of dark fur sometimes seen on their back. There is a single California grizzly specimen showing this pattern at the Museum of Vertebrate Zoology at Berkeley (MVZ 16615).

William F. Edgar was told by Native Americans living at Fort Tejon that Lebeck, a trapper passing through the canyon, went off by himself in pursuit of a large grizzly and shot it underneath the oak tree. Approaching it, the bear fatally mauled him. The visit was probably in 1893. Outside of this, nothing else solid is known about Lebeck. A number of apocryphal works and speculative theories have emerged regarding him, such as that he was an Acadian French spy sent by the Republic of Texas. A memoir attributed to Lebec and published in a local newspaper claims he was a Lieutenant of Engineers in the French Army named Pierre Lebecque, who was present with Napoleon on Elba. In 1915, a five franc coin, dated 1837, was found in the ruins of an adobe hospital on Fort Tejon grounds, fueling legends that he was connected to the French government.

== Popular interest in the gravesite ==
The grave of Lebeck and the inscription is mentioned, along with the carcass of a bear, in the diaries of three members of the Mormon Battalion, a group of volunteers who passed through the area in 1847. The journal of Robert S. Bliss, for 31 July 1847, reads

...After staking out my horses I ascended the mountains to some spruce trees near the top. There I took a view of the mountain scenery; it was grand in the extreme. I saw many signs of bear, antelope, and deer, as this is a general watering place for those animals. I found the head of a bear which I brought to camp. Our Indian pilot said it was the bear that killed a man in this place. While I was writing, one of our boys said there was a grave within a few rods of our camp. I quit writing and visited the grave. I read on a tree at the head of the same: 'Peter Lebeck killed by a bear Oct. 17, 1837', with a cross over the writing and the letters J. S. (Jesus Salvador).

After the Mexican-American War, William Phipps Blake, accompanying the party of Robert S. Williamson, made note of the monument and an "unusual number of grizzly bears" in 1853, writing that it was a "durable monument."

Fort Tejon was founded in the immediate vicinity in 1854 to suppress stock rustling and protect Native Americans in the San Joaquin Valley, with Lebeck's grave marking the north corner of the parade ground. William Ingraham Kip noticed the bark was beginning to cover the epitaph in 1855. By the time John Xantus was living at Fort Tejon, between 1857 and 1859, the inscription had been covered by new bark.

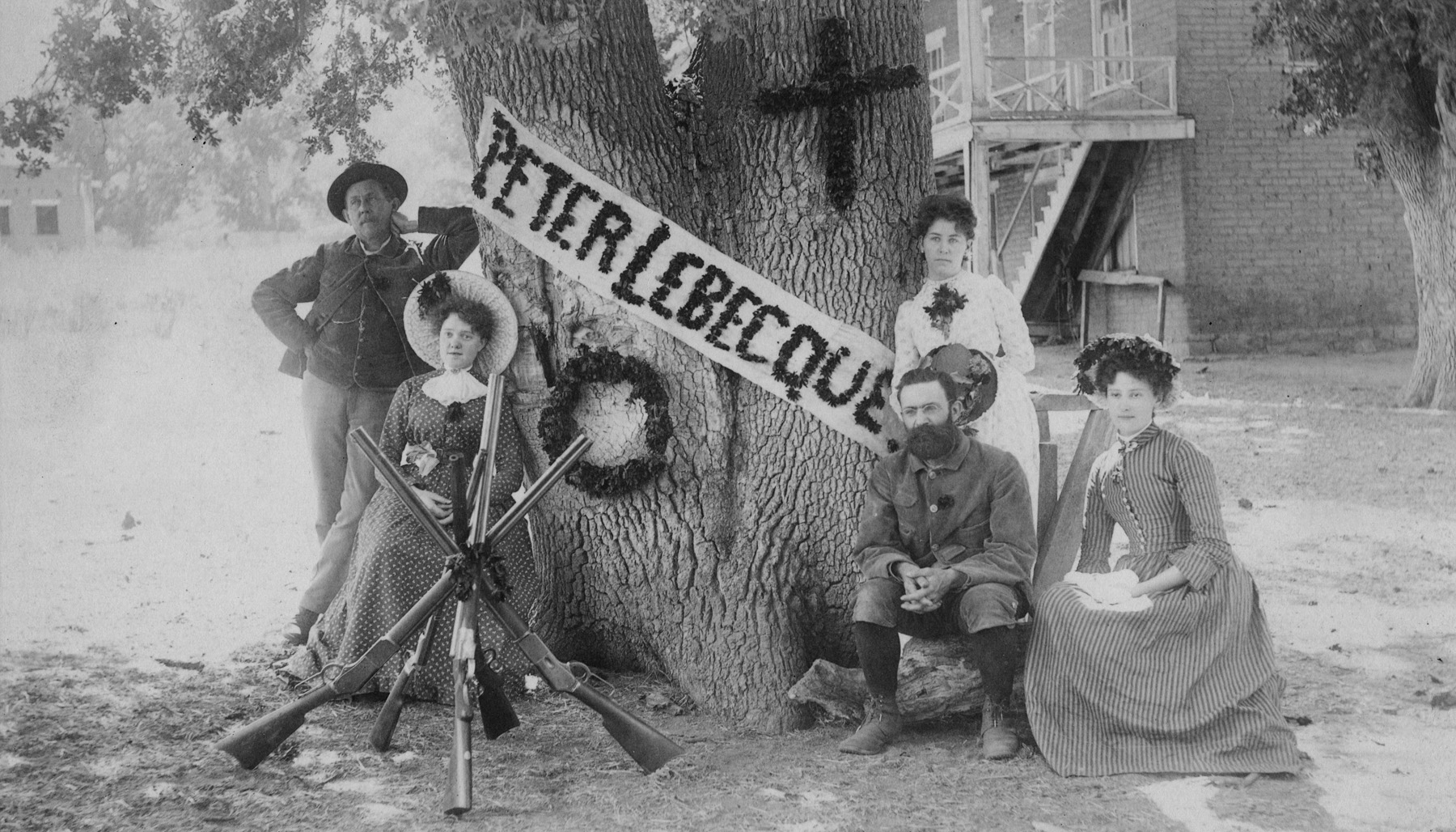
The Foxtail Rangers next to the Peter Lebeck Oak at Fort Tejon, 1890

In 1890, an informal group from Bakersfield called the Foxtail Rangers, including local sheriff Henry L. Borgwardt Jr., removed the bark with the permission of Edward Fitzgerald Beale and rediscovered the inscription in reverse on its underside. Four feet under the surface, they exhumed a skeleton "nearly six feet long, and broad in proportion" with "a remarkable state of preservation." The body was laid east-west, with the left arm folded over the breast. The right forearm, both feet, and the left hand were missing. Two ribs on the left side were broken. A contemporary newspaper article reports that Lebeck was buried with the bear that killed him. The exhumation has been called one of the earliest examples of historic sites archaeology in California.

The removed bark was initially in the possession of the local Kern County Sheriff's Office. Truxtun Beale, Edward's son, sued in the Superior Court for possession of the carving. In 1940, the State of California acquired part of the original Fort Tejon property for a state park, however, this grant did not include the Lebeck Oak or several lesser structures.

=== Legacy ===
The epitaph was housed in the U.S. Forestry Service ranger station at Fort Tejon, and is now at the Kern County Museum in Bakersfield. The Native Sons and Daughters of the El Tejon and Bakersfield parlors placed a granite monument at the site on 5 April 1936. E Clampus Vitus dedicated a plaque on the site on 14 October 1972. Further, the Kern County division of E Clampus Vitus is named Peter Lebeck Chapter #1866. Mary Hunter Austin's novel Isidro, published serially in The Atlantic, features a Peter Lebecque, who lives in a hut in Cañada de las Uvas. He is killed by a bear and buried under an oak in Tejon Pass. Austin also describes Lebeck and the Lebeck Oak in The Flock. San Joaquin poet Don Thompson writes of Lebeck in his collection Local Color. The town of Lebec, California is named for him, and the tree he is buried under is likewise known as the Peter Lebeck Oak.

The Fort Tejon Historical Park holds a "ghost night" every October 17 in reference to Lebeck.

== See also ==
- List of fatal bear attacks in North America
  - Isaac Slover
  - John "Grizzly" Adams
