= Mount Alpenglow =

Mountain in Alaska, U.S.

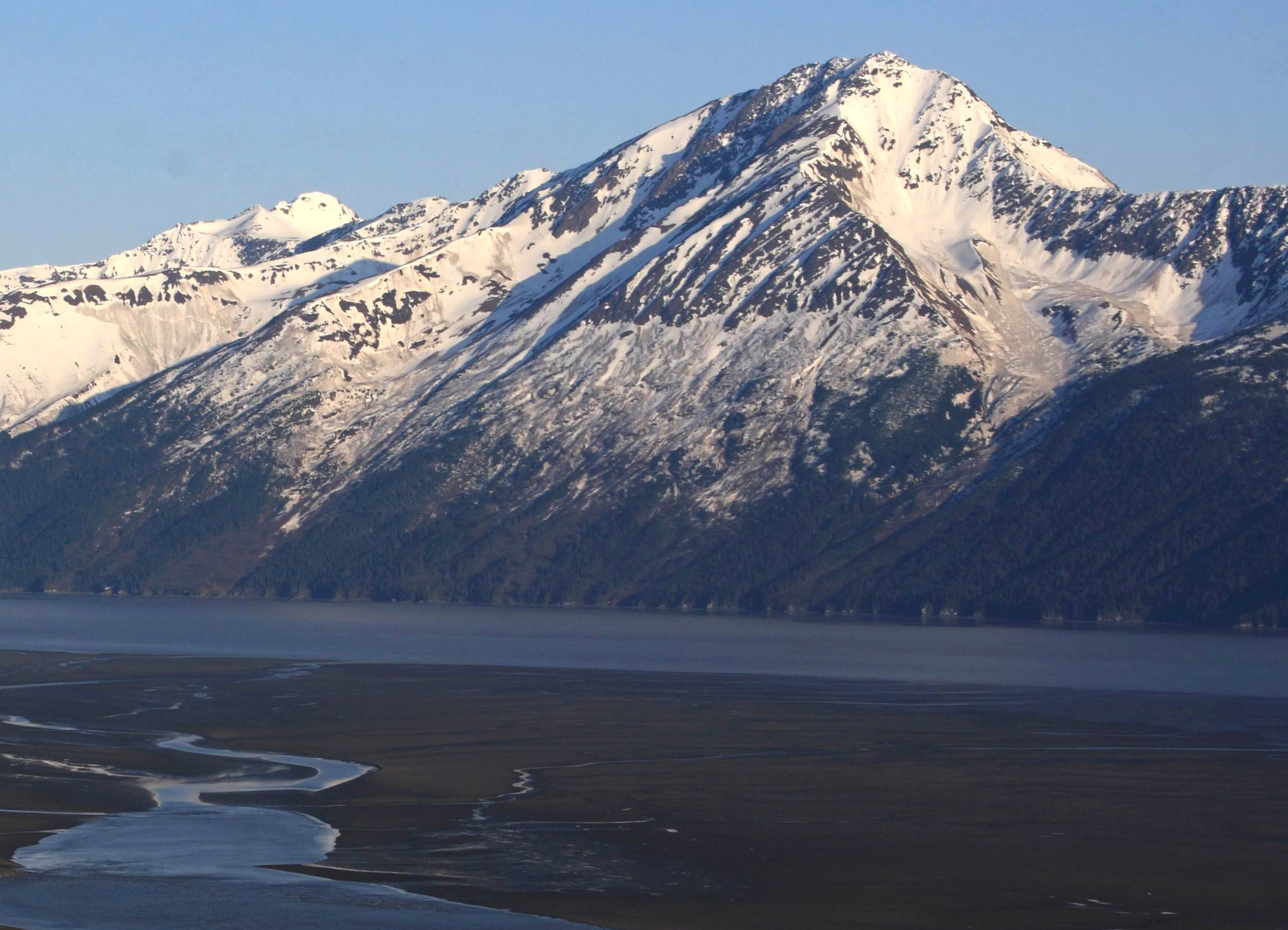
- Mount Alpenglow seen above Turnagain Arm

Highest point
- Elevation: 4,816 ft (1,468 m)
- Prominence: 1,816 ft (554 m)
- Isolation: 8.35 mi (13.44 km)
- Coordinates: 60°52′31″N 149°20′03″W

Geography
- Location within Alaska
- Interactive map of Mount Alpenglow
- Country: United States
- State: Alaska
- Borough: Kenai Peninsula
- Protected area: Chugach National Forest
- Parent range: Kenai Mountains
- Topo map: USGS Seward D-7

Mount Alpenglow is a 4,816-foot (1,468 m) landmark mountain located in the Kenai Mountains, in the U.S. state of Alaska. The peak is situated in Chugach National Forest, 8 mi (13 km) southwest of Girdwood, Alaska, on the south shore of Turnagain Arm, opposite Bird Point from where it can be prominently seen from the Seward Highway and the Alaska Railroad. Mount Alpenglow is the highest peak alongside Turnagain Arm, and although modest in elevation, relief is significant since the northern aspect of the mountain rises nearly a vertical mile in only one mile from the sea-level shores. The summit of Penguin Peak offers another good view of Alpenglow 6 mi (10 km) directly across the arm.

The mountain was so named since it often displays the post-sunset pink glow known as alpenglow for travelers on the Seward Highway and skiers at Alyeska Resort. The mountain's toponym was officially adopted in 1969 by the United States Board on Geographic Names.

== Climate ==
Based on the Köppen climate classification, Mount Alpenglow is located in a subarctic climate zone with long, cold, snowy winters, and mild summers. Weather systems coming off the Gulf of Alaska are forced upwards by the Kenai Mountains (orographic lift), causing heavy precipitation in the form of rainfall and snowfall. Winter temperatures can drop below 0 °F with wind chill factors below −10 °F. The months of May and June offer the most favorable weather for climbing.

== Gallery ==
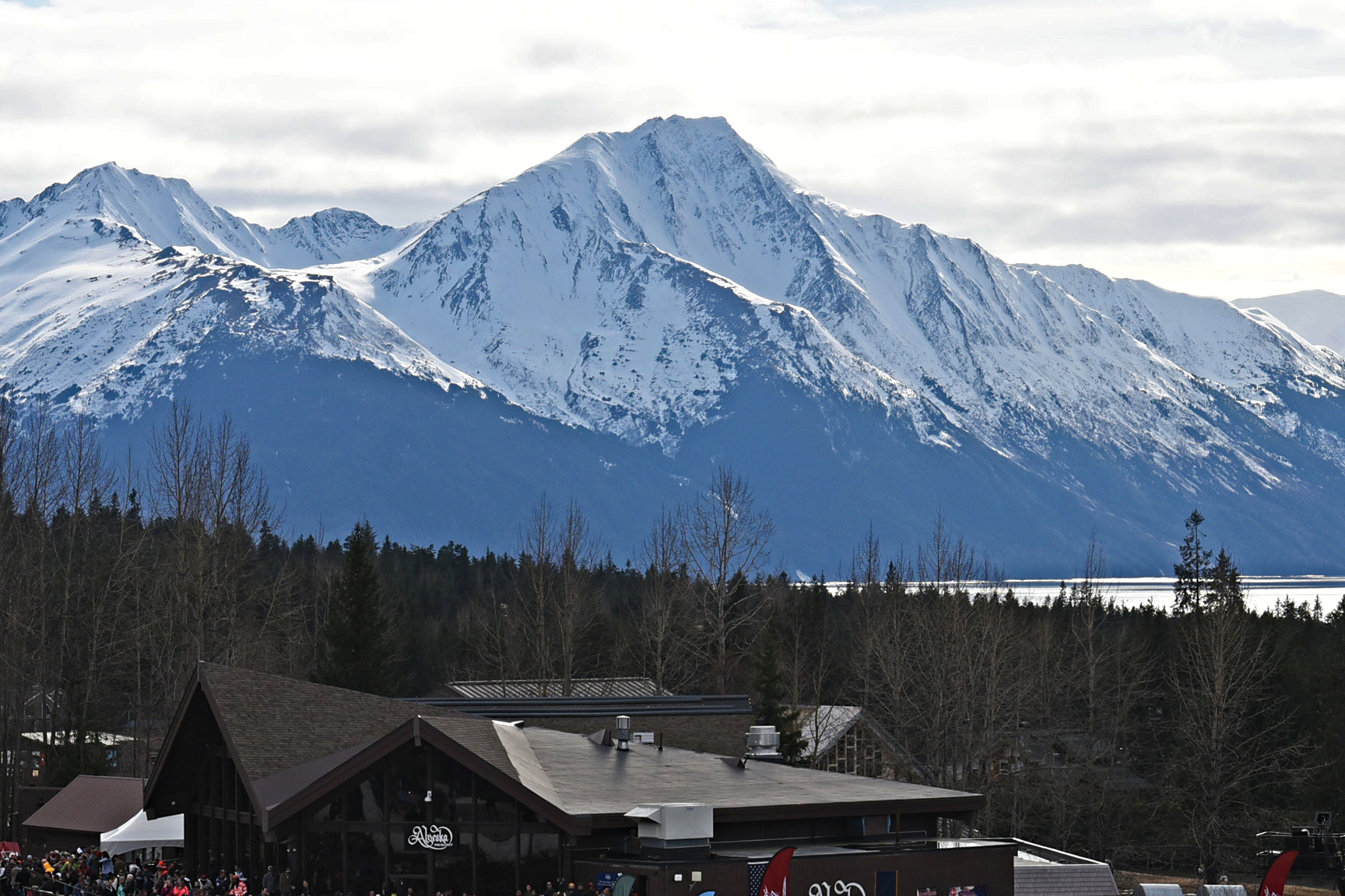
Mount Alpenglow seen from Alyeska Resort

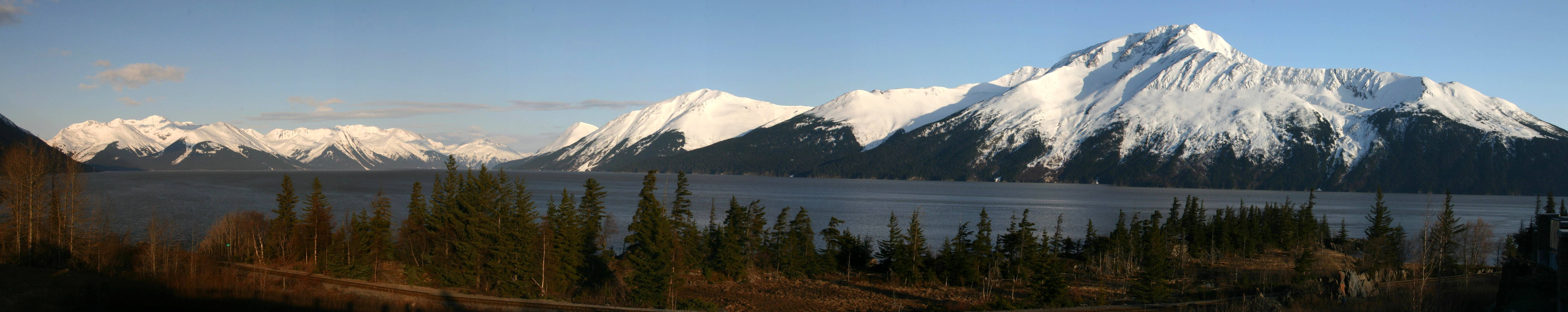
Mt. Alpenglow (right) from Bird Point

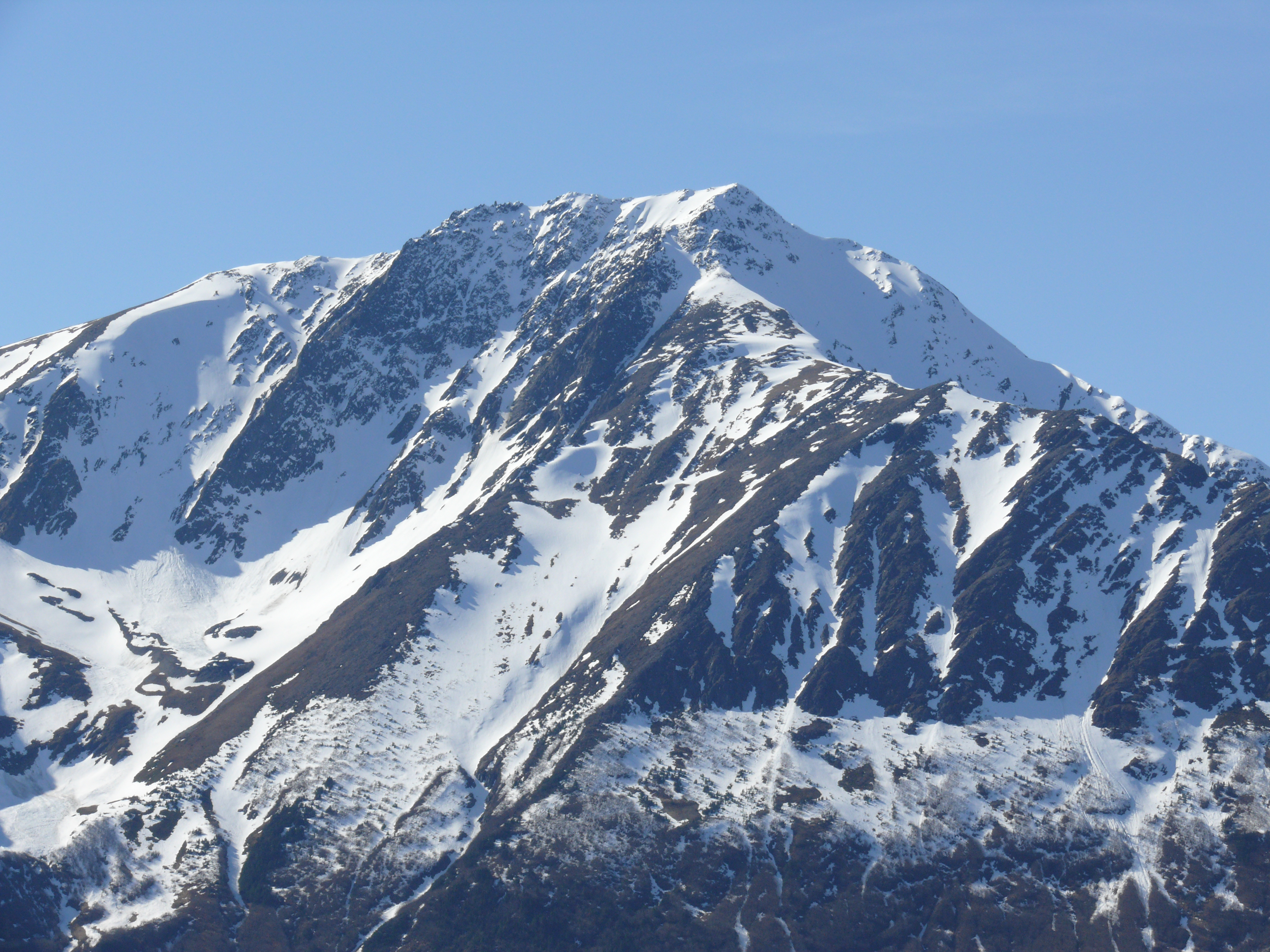
Mount Alpenglow

== See also ==
- List of mountain peaks of Alaska
- Geography of Alaska
