= Indian Valley Mine =

Mine in Alaska, United States

- U.S. National Register of Historic Places
- U.S. Historic district
- Alaska Heritage Resources Survey
- Location: Address restricted
- Nearest city: Indian, Anchorage, Alaska
- Area: 5 acres (2.0 ha)
- Built: 1920
- NRHP reference No.: 89001762
- AHRS No.: SEW-412
- Added to NRHP: October 25, 1989

The Indian Valley Mine is a historic quartz mine located at 27301 Seward Highway (mile marker 104) near the community of Indian in the Municipality of Anchorage, Alaska, between the main area of Anchorage and the city of Seward on the north shore of Turnagain Arm.

== Location and Discovery ==
The mine sits on a 5-acre site along the north side of Turnagain Arm, between Anchorage and Seward. It was discovered in 1910 by Peter Strong, who arrived in Alaska during the Klondike Gold Rush of 1898. Strong initially staked a small gold claim in the area before discovering the quartz vein that would become the Indian Valley Mine. He operated the mine through the 1920s and 1930s, during which time he built a cabin and an assay house. These buildings are considered the oldest known structures in the Turnagain Arm region.

The mine has been listed on the National Register of Historic Places since October 25, 1989.

== See also ==
- Indian, Anchorage
- National Register of Historic Places listings in Anchorage, Alaska
