= Penguin Peak =

Mountain in Alaska, U.S.

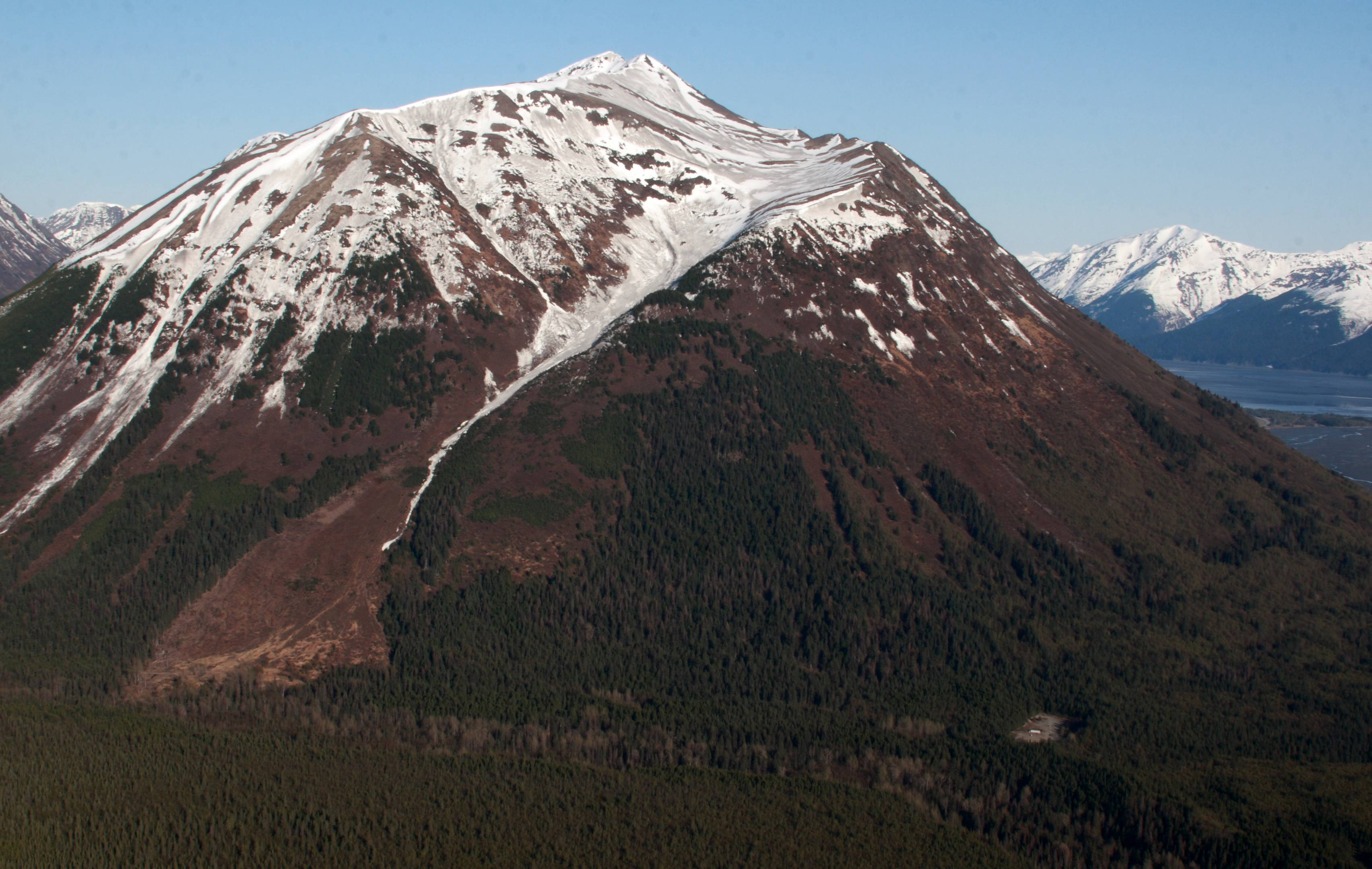
- Penguin Peak seen from Bird Ridge

Highest point
- Elevation: 4,331 ft (1,320 m)
- Prominence: 1,437 ft (438 m)
- Coordinates: 60°57′55″N 149°22′31″W

Geography
- Location within Alaska
- Interactive map of Penguin Peak
- Location: Chugach National Forest; Anchorage Municipality, Alaska; United States
- Parent range: Chugach Mountains
- Topo map: USGS Seward D-7

Climbing
- Easiest route: Hiking class 2

Penguin Peak is a 4,331-foot (1,320 m) mountain summit located in the Chugach Mountains, in Anchorage Municipality in the U.S. state of Alaska. The peak is situated in Chugach State Park, 30 mi (48 km) southeast of downtown Anchorage, and 8 mi (13 km) east of the Alyeska Resort and Girdwood area. The peak is the dominant feature along the north shore of Turnagain Arm when traveling the Seward Highway, and the summit offers a good view of Mount Alpenglow, 6 mi (10 km) directly across Turnagain Arm to the south.

== Climate ==
Based on the Köppen climate classification, Penguin Peak is located in a subarctic climate zone with cold, snowy winters, and mild summers. Weather systems coming off the Gulf of Alaska are forced upwards by the Chugach Mountains (orographic lift), causing heavy precipitation in the form of rainfall and snowfall. Temperatures can drop below −20 °C with wind chill factors below −30 °C. Precipitation runoff from the mountain drains into Penguin Creek and Turnagain Arm.

== Gallery ==
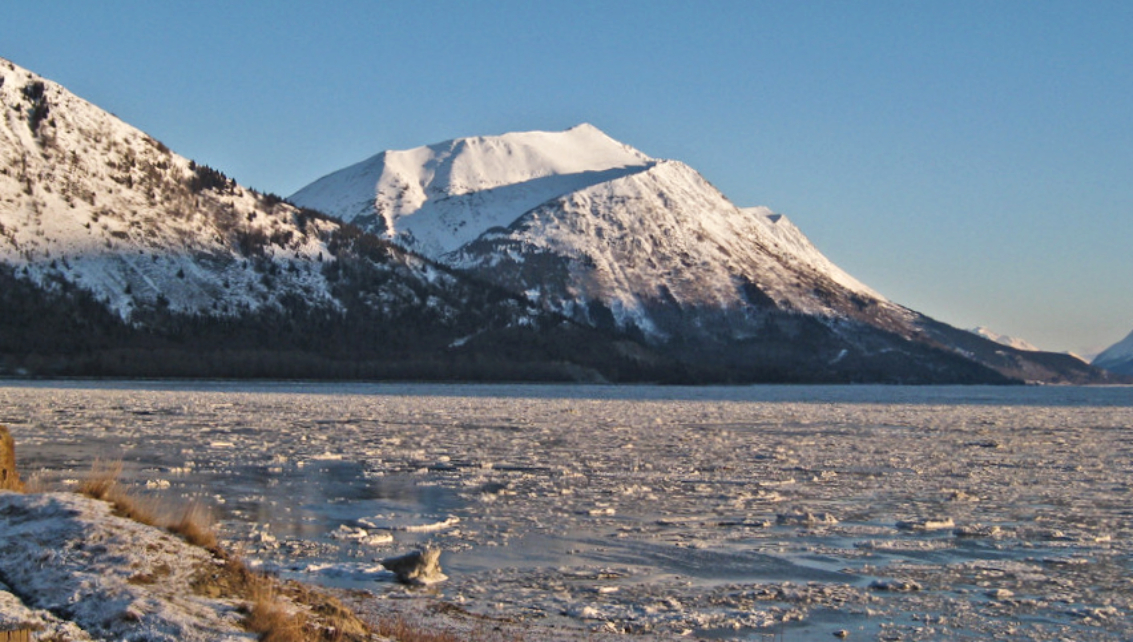
Penguin Peak seen from Seward Highway

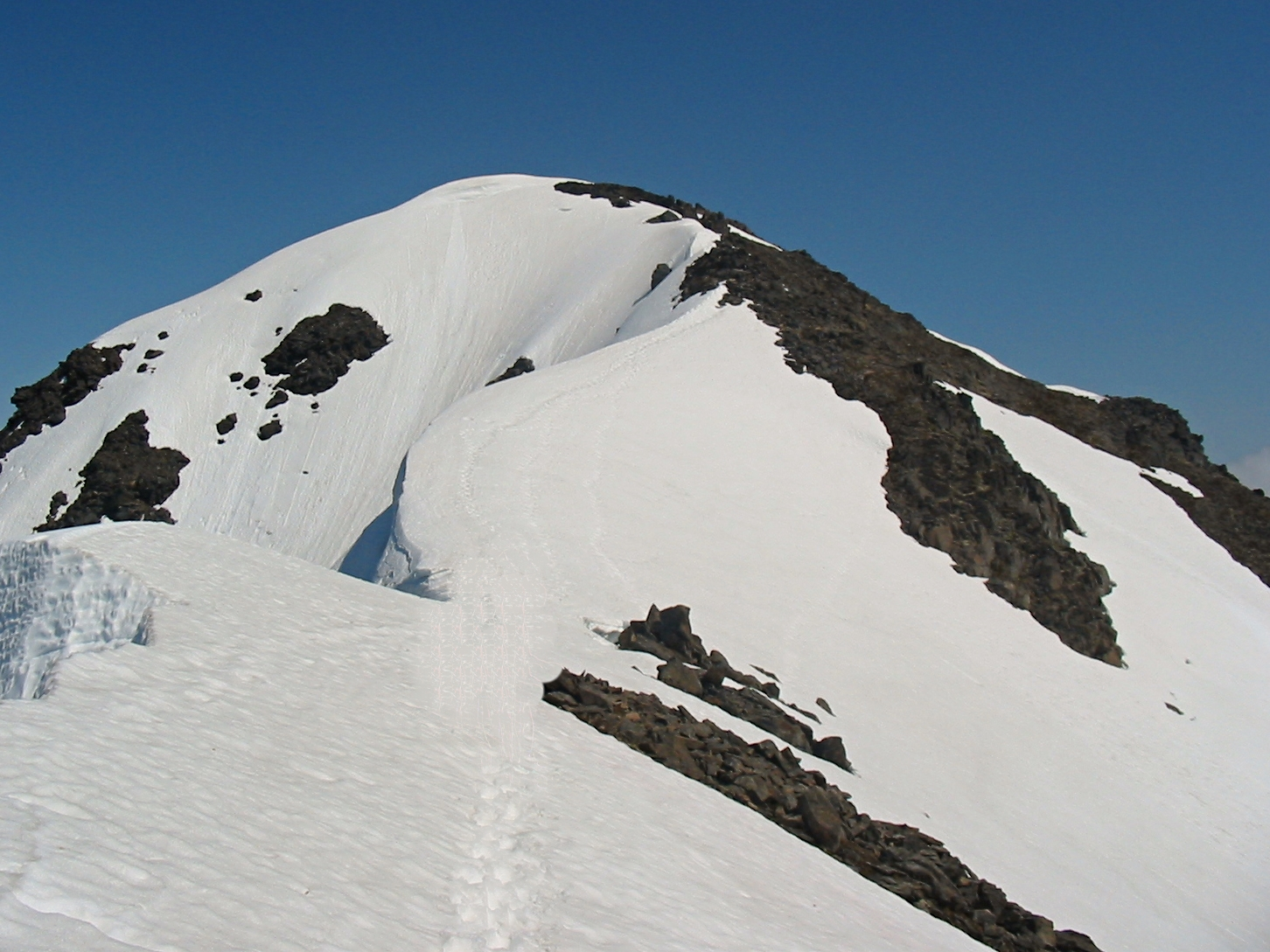
Summit detail

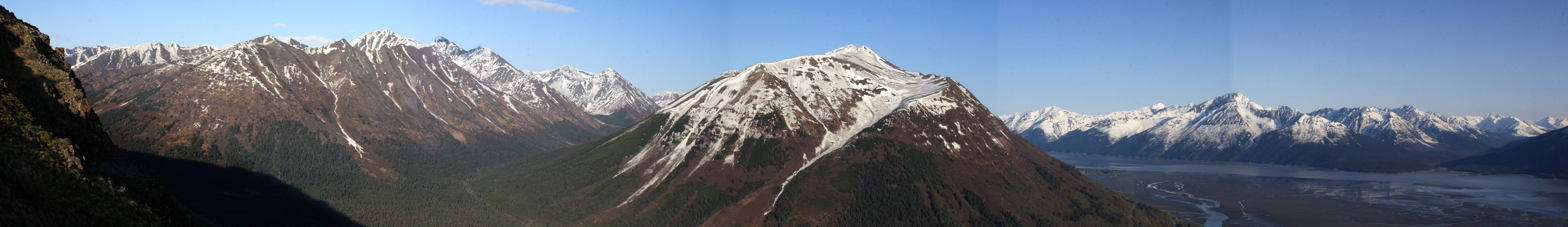
Panorama from Bird Ridge with Penguin Peak centered

== See also ==
- List of mountain peaks of Alaska
- Geology of Alaska
