= Indian, Anchorage =

Unincorporated community in the state of Alaska, United States

Coordinates: 60.99°N 149.51°W

Indian Indian Valley
- Unincorporated community
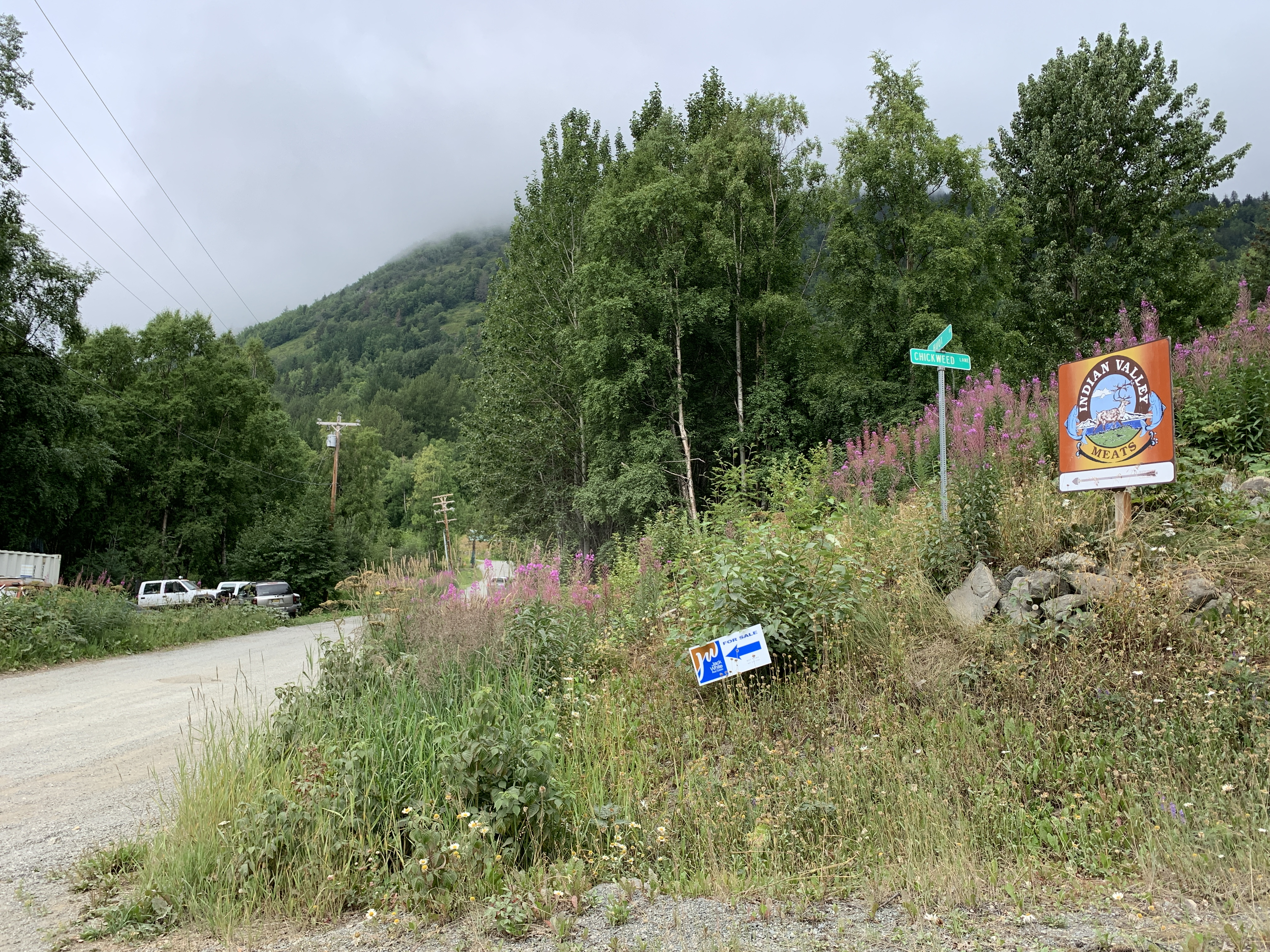
- Indian
- Interactive map of Indian
- Country: United States
- State: Alaska
- Borough: Municipality of Anchorage
- Time zone: UTC-9 (AKST)
  - Summer (DST): UTC-8 (AKDT)
- ZIP code: 99540
- Area code: 907

Indian (also known as Indian Valley) is a community in Anchorage, Alaska, United States. It lies in a valley in the Chugach Mountains near the middle of the north shore of the Turnagain Arm of Cook Inlet. It is about 24 miles (39 km) southeast of downtown Anchorage and about 3 miles (4.8 km) northwest of Bird, and about 13 miles (21 km) west-northwest of Girdwood.

== Description ==
The community is located just west of Indian Creek and north of the Seward Highway within the Indian Valley. (The Seward Highway provides the only roadway access to Indian.) Although not part of the Chugach State Park, the community is entirely surrounded by the park.

Although the Alaska Railroad passes through the southern edge of the community (and has a siding that runs most of the length of community) none of the railroad's regular passenger trains stop in Indian. However, there are two special event trains that operate out of the Anchorage station that turn around (reverse direction) in Indian before returning to Anchorage. These two trains include the annual Easter Train and the Holiday Train (which runs twice each day on selected Saturdays in December). Neither train allows passengers to disembark in Indian.

The origin of the community (and currently one of the main attractions) is the Indian Valley Mine. The mine was established 1920 and is currently listed on the National Register of Historic Places.

== Climate ==
Indian Creek Pass rises out of Indian to the north, up the Indian Valley and into the Chugach Mountains. Indian Creek Pass has a subarctic climate (Köppen Dsc), with much more precipitation than Anchorage as it is less shielded by the mountains from Pacific storms.

Climate data for Indian Pass, Alaska (elevation 2,350 feet or 716 meters), 1991–2020 normals, 1981–2020 extremes
Month	Jan	Feb	Mar	Apr	May	Jun	Jul	Aug	Sep	Oct	Nov	Dec	Year
Record high °F (°C)	54 (12)	48 (9)	53 (12)	64 (18)	72 (22)	79 (26)	82 (28)	82 (28)	68 (20)	53 (12)	46 (8)	46 (8)	82 (28)
Mean maximum °F (°C)	36 (2)	37 (3)	43 (6)	52 (11)	63 (17)	70 (21)	72 (22)	69 (21)	57 (14)	46 (8)	38 (3)	36 (2)	72 (22)
Mean daily maximum °F (°C)	23.7 (−4.6)	25.5 (−3.6)	30.5 (−0.8)	40.7 (4.8)	50.1 (10.1)	56.8 (13.8)	59.4 (15.2)	56.9 (13.8)	48.2 (9.0)	35.6 (2.0)	27.1 (−2.7)	25.6 (−3.6)	40.0 (4.5)
Daily mean °F (°C)	18.8 (−7.3)	20.3 (−6.5)	23.0 (−5.0)	32.5 (0.3)	41.8 (5.4)	48.6 (9.2)	52.3 (11.3)	50.2 (10.1)	42.3 (5.7)	31.0 (−0.6)	22.4 (−5.3)	20.7 (−6.3)	33.7 (0.9)
Mean daily minimum °F (°C)	13.7 (−10.2)	15.2 (−9.3)	15.5 (−9.2)	24.3 (−4.3)	33.5 (0.8)	40.4 (4.7)	45.4 (7.4)	43.4 (6.3)	36.3 (2.4)	26.3 (−3.2)	17.5 (−8.1)	15.8 (−9.0)	27.3 (−2.6)
Mean minimum °F (°C)	−9 (−23)	−5 (−21)	−1 (−18)	11 (−12)	25 (−4)	33 (1)	39 (4)	36 (2)	27 (−3)	11 (−12)	−1 (−18)	−2 (−19)	−14 (−26)
Record low °F (°C)	−36 (−38)	−27 (−33)	−18 (−28)	−8 (−22)	16 (−9)	28 (−2)	34 (1)	29 (−2)	14 (−10)	−6 (−21)	−18 (−28)	−13 (−25)	−36 (−38)
Average precipitation inches (mm)	3.75 (95)	3.95 (100)	3.25 (83)	2.69 (68)	1.56 (40)	1.40 (36)	2.99 (76)	6.13 (156)	6.71 (170)	5.10 (130)	4.76 (121)	4.75 (121)	47.04 (1,196)
Source 1: XMACIS2
Source 2: NOAA (Precipitation)

== See also ==
- Alaska Railroad
- Chugach State Park
- Indian Valley Mine
- Seward Highway
- Turnagain Arm
