= Napartok Bay =

- Location within Newfoundland and Labrador
- Coordinates: 57.985°N 62.306°W
- Max. length: 15 miles (24 km)
- Max. width: 1.3 miles (2.1 km)

Napartok Bay

Napartok Bay is a long narrow inlet or bay in Labrador, Canada. From its head to the sea it is about 15 miles (24 km) long. It contains the northernmost boreal forest along the eastern coast of North America.
