= 1978 Algonquin Provincial Park bear attack =

Bear attack in Ontario, Canada

- Location: Algonquin Provincial Park, Ontario, Canada
- Date: May 13, 1978
- Attack type: Bear attack
- Victims: 3

On May 13, 1978, a male American black bear killed three teenage boys in Algonquin Provincial Park, Ontario, Canada. The boys were fishing near Radiant Lake in the northeastern section of the park. The incident is widely regarded as the deadliest black bear attack in North America.

== Location ==
The attack occurred in the northeastern region of Algonquin Provincial Park near the Achray Road area, reportedly around Lone Creek and Radiant Lake. This region is heavily forested and known for brook trout fishing.

== Victims ==
- George Halfkenny, 16, male
- Mark Halfkenny, 12, male
- Billy Rhindress, 15, male

A fourth teenager, Richard Rhindress, survived because he returned to the vehicle and alerted authorities after the others failed to return.

== Attack ==
On May 13 1978 four boys entered the park for a trout fishing trip. According to later reconstructions by investigators, they spent most of the day fishing in various streams. George Halfkenny had reportedly caught multiple trout and carried them in his pocket.

Late in the day, George went ahead alone and Mark and Billy later followed. Richard Rhindress stayed behind near the vehicle to sleep. When the others failed to return, he searched unsuccessfully and alerted the authorities.

Searchers later found the bodies of the three boys. Reports state that an approximately 275 pound black bear was found guarding the bodies and was subsequently shot by authorities.

Investigators initially suspected the trout carried by George Halfkenny attracted the bear, although later investigation revealed that the trout were intact, suggesting the attack was predatory rather than food-conditioned scavenging behavior.
