= H. Louis Duhring Jr. =

American architect (1874-1953)

Herman Louis Duhring Jr.
- Born: March 24, 1874; Philadelphia, Pennsylvania, U.S.
- Died: July 18, 1953 (aged 79); Philadelphia, Pennsylvania, U.S.
- Resting place: West Laurel Hill Cemetery, Bala Cynwyd, Pennsylvania, U.S.
- Education: University of Pennsylvania
- Occupation: architect

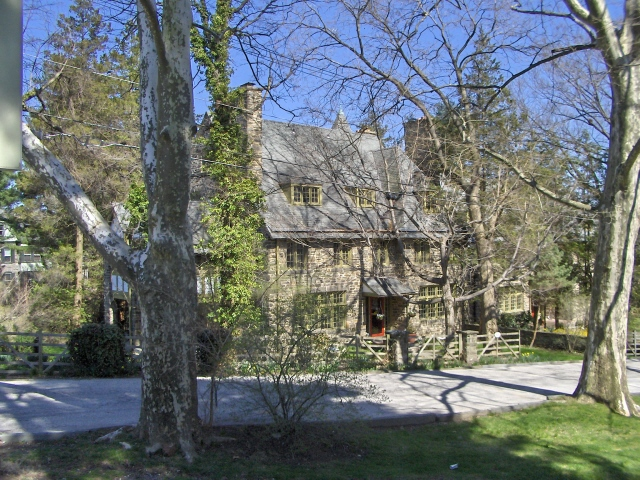
300-06 West Willow Grove Avenue, Chestnut Hill, Philadelphia (1913), Durhing, Okie & Ziegler, architects. One of Duhring's Cotswold-style houses.

Herman Louis Duhring Jr. (March 24, 1874 - July 18, 1953) was an American architect. He co-founded the architectural firm Duhring, Okie & Ziegler in 1899, which became Duhring & Ziegler from 1918 to 1924, after which Duhring worked independently. Between 1910 and 1930, he designed 180 houses in the Chesnut Hill neighborhood of Philadelphia. He worked on historical renovations including the Rocky Mills mansion in Virginia and the Powel House in Philadelphia. Several of his buildings are listed on the U.S. National Register of Historic Places.

== Early life and education ==
He was born March 24, 1874, in Philadelphia to Reverend Herman L. and Lucy (Bryant) Duhring. He attended local public schools and graduated from Central Manual Training School in 1891. He received a B.S. degree in architecture from the University of Pennsylvania in 1904.

== Career ==
He worked in the architectural offices of Mantle Fielding in 1892, Furness, Evans & Co. in 1893, and Frank Miles Day in 1896. He was the winner of the first Stewardson Traveling Scholarship which funded his travel to Venice, Italy. His measured drawings of St Mark's Campanile were used in the rebuild of the tower after its collapse in 1902. He returned to Philadelphia in 1898, and opened his own office. In 1899, he formed a partnership with R. Brognard Okie and Carl Ziegler – Duhring, Okie & Ziegler. Okie left the firm in 1918, and the partnership continued as Duhring & Ziegler until 1924, after which Duhring worked independently.

Between 1910 and 1930, Dr. George Woodward commissioned about 180 houses in the Chestnut Hill neighborhood of Philadelphia, using mostly architects Edmund B. Gilchrist, Robert Rodes McGoodwin and Duhring. Among the earliest were Duhring's innovative "Quadruple Houses" (1910) – four attached houses huddled together so that each shared one long and one short wall. These provided tenants with more privacy than row houses, and were cheaper to build than detached houses. Woodward built two sets of "Quads" on Benezet Street, and later three more sets on Nippon Street in Mount Airy. Duhring also designed dozens of Cotswold-style houses for Woodward. A replica of Sulgrave Manor, the English ancestral home of George Washington, was an attraction at the 1926 Sesquicentennial Exposition in Philadelphia. Woodward bought its interiors, and had them installed in his own replica, designed by Duhring, that stands at 200 West Willow Grove Avenue in Chestnut Hill.

Duhring managed the disassembly, relocation, reassembly, and restoration of two Georgian mansions – "Whitby Hall" in West Philadelphia was relocated to Haverford, Pennsylvania, in 1922–24; and Rocky Mills near Ashland, Virginia was relocated to Richmond, Virginia in 1928. Whitby's magnificent staircase – a smaller-scale version of the staircase at Independence Hall – and other interiors were sold to the Detroit Institute of Arts to pay for the costly project. Duhring modernized the relocated "Rocky Mills" in a particularly sensitive way – by increasing the building's depth, he was able to insert bathrooms and closets between its unaltered front and back halves.

In 1931, the Philadelphia Society for the Preservation of Landmarks hired Duhring to restore the Powel House (built c. 1765). Once one of the grandest Georgian houses in Philadelphia, it was then being used as a warehouse and commercial building, and was facing demolition. Its ornate parlor had been removed and installed in the Metropolitan Museum of Art, and its ballroom had been removed and installed in the Philadelphia Museum of Art. The building was restored, its lost rooms were re-created, and the Society opened it as a house museum.

Duhring was a member of the Philadelphia Chapter of the American Institute of Architects, and was elected a Fellow in 1952. He served on the board of directors for the Pennsylvania Academy of Fine Arts.

He died July 18, 1953, in the Germantown neighborhood of Philadelphia, and was interred at West Laurel Hill Cemetery in Bala Cynwyd, Pennsylvania.

== Selected works ==
- St. Peter's by-the-Sea Episcopal Church (1899), 611 Lincoln Street, Sitka, Alaska, designed by Duhring Jr., NRHP-listed.
- See House (1899), 611 Lincoln Street, Sitka, Alaska, designed by Duhring Jr., NRHP-listed. The residence of the first Episcopal bishop of Alaska.
- Church of the Redeemer (1908, burned and demolished 2012, re-creation under construction 2014), 20th and Atlantic Avenues, Longport, New Jersey, designed by Duhring, Okie & Ziegler, NRHP-listed. Duhring probably was the principal designer. His father was a friend of the donor of the land.
- "Quadruple Houses" (1910), Benezet Street, Chestnut Hill, Philadelphia, Dr. George Woodward, client. A contributing property in Chestnut Hill Historic District.
- Relocation of Whitby Hall (1922–24). Duhring managed the relocation of the 1754 Georgian mansion from 1601 South 58th Street, Philadelphia, Pennsylvania to Tunbridge Road, Haverford, Pennsylvania. It is now renamed "Whitby New."
- Sulgrave Manor (1927), 200 West Willow Grove Avenue, Chestnut Hill, Philadelphia, Pennsylvania, Dr. George Woodward, client. The interiors came from a replica built for the 1926 Sesquicentennial Exposition.
- Relocation of Rocky Mills (1928), NRHP-listed. Duhring managed the relocation of the circa-1750 Georgian mansion from outside Ashland, Virginia to 211 Ross Road, Richmond, Virginia. It is now renamed "Fairfield."
- Restoration of the Powel House (1931–33), 244 South 3rd Street, Philadelphia, Pennsylvania.
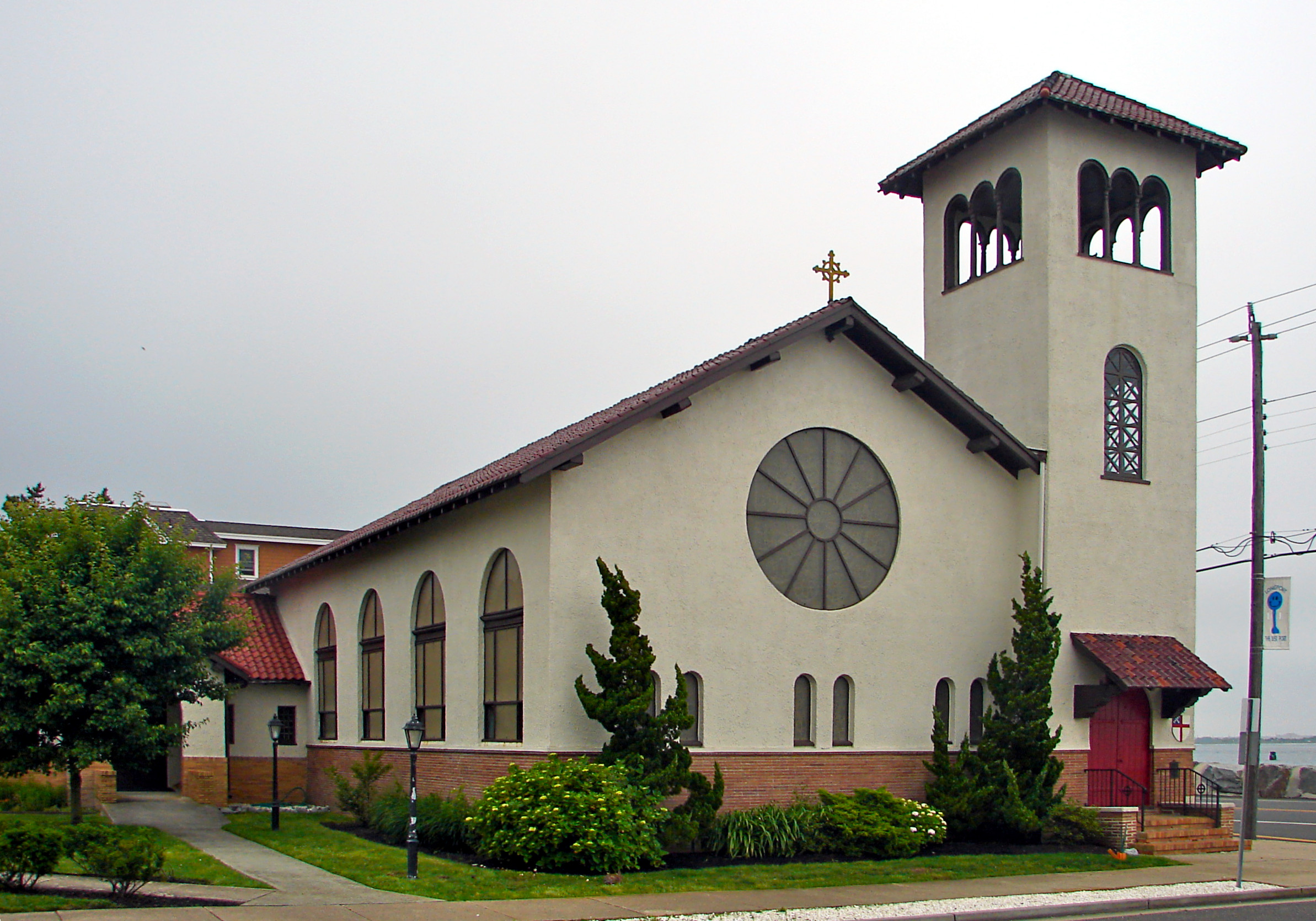
Church of the Redeemer (1908, burned and demolished 2012, re-creation under construction 2014), Longport, New Jersey.

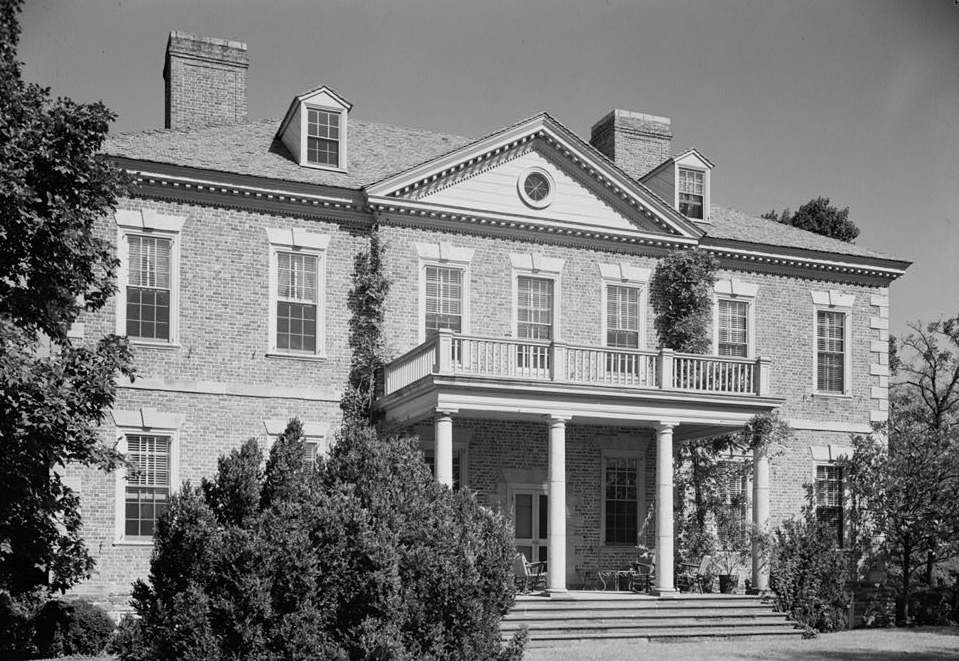
Rocky Mills, Richmond, Virginia. Durhing managed the 1928 relocation and expansion of the mansion.

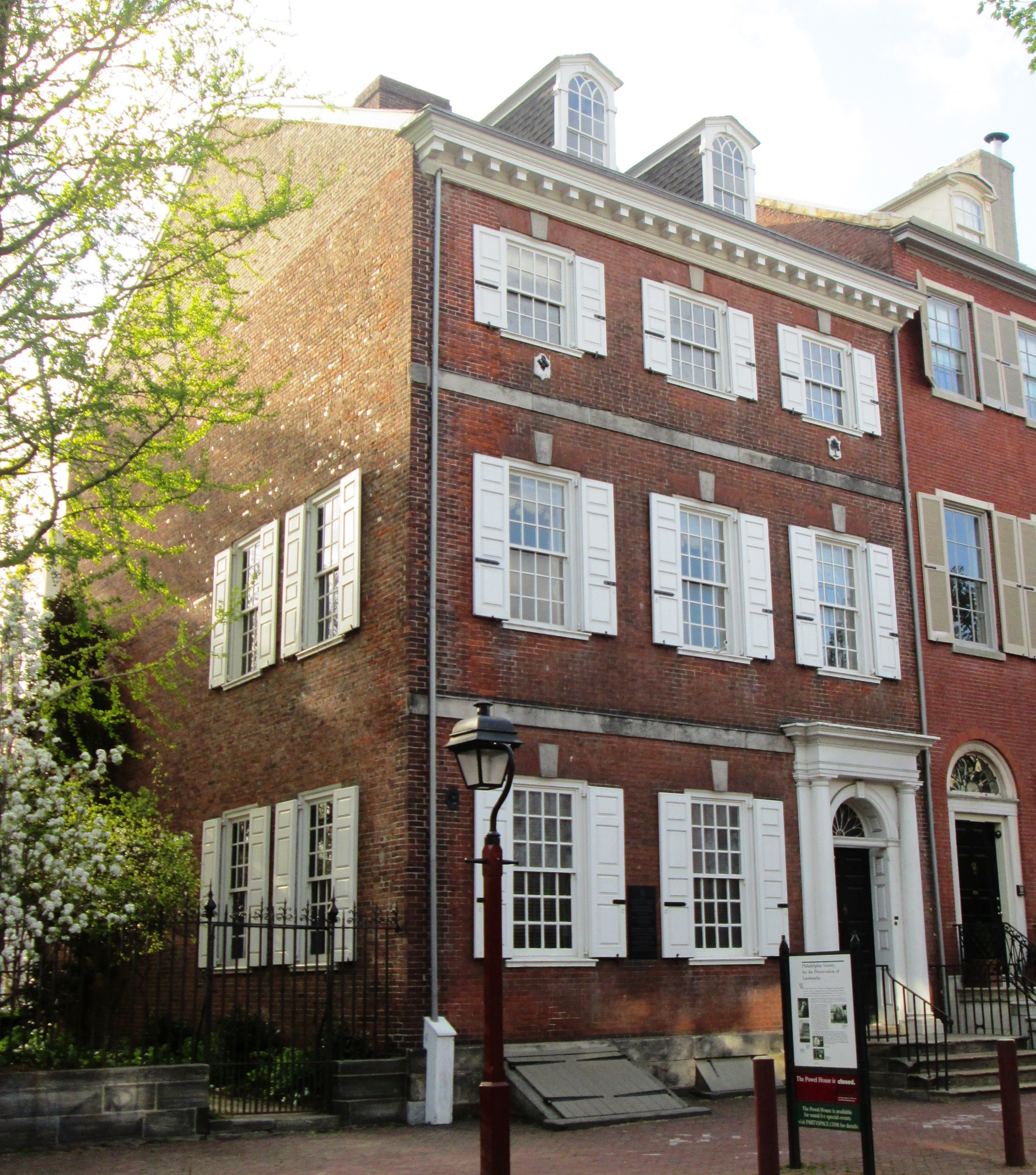
Powel House, Philadelphia, Pennsylvania. Restored by Duhring, 1931–33.
