= KCAW =

Radio station in Sitka, Alaska

- Sitka, Alaska; United States
- Broadcast area: Alaska Panhandle
- Frequency: 104.7 MHz (HD Radio)
- Branding: Raven Radio

Programming
- Format: Public Radio

Ownership
- Owner: Raven Radio Foundation

History
- First air date: March 6, 1982

Technical information
- Class: A
- ERP: 3,600 watts
- HAAT: -186 meters
- Transmitter coordinates: 57°3′13″N 135°21′7″W

Links
- Website: www.kcaw.org

KCAW is a non-commercial radio station in Sitka, Alaska, on 104.7 FM, which airs public radio programming. It first went on air in 1982.

== History ==
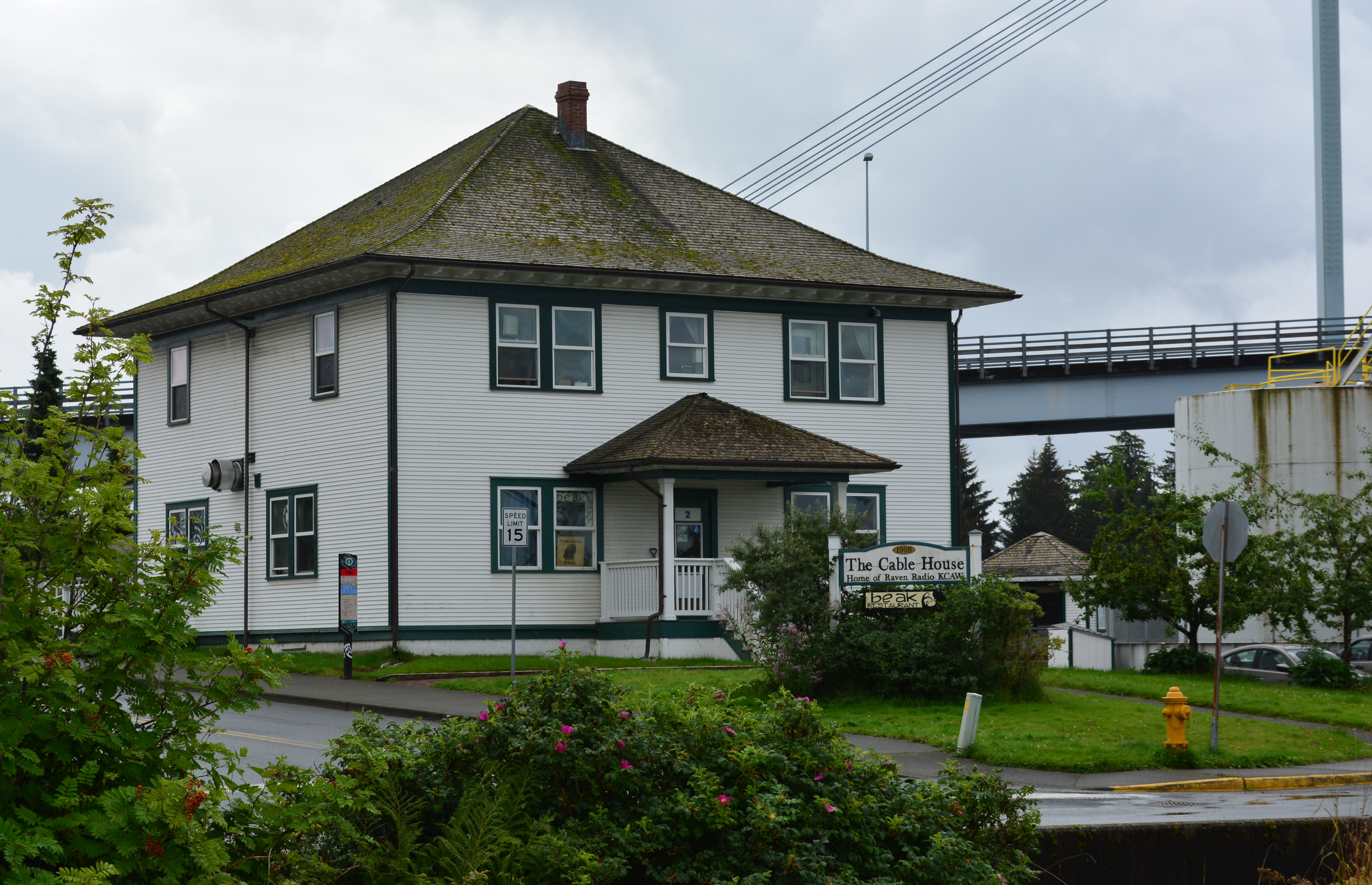
Cable House and Station photographed in August 2023, with signage showing that KCAW studios are housed in the building.

KCAW first began daily broadcasts on March 6, 1982 after a sign-on broadcast on February 19. During the years the Sitka Pulp Mill operated, Raven Radio News broadcast opposing perspectives to those of Alaska's national representatives on the issue of resource development. The Anchorage Times, after at first defending resources developers, eventually investigated the issue and found that Raven Radio was presenting an overall unbiased account of Sitka's issues.

Original materials from KCAW have been contributed to the American Archive of Public Broadcasting.

== Programming ==
KCAW is Sitka's only public radio station and offers a wide variety of programming. News for the station includes local news coming from Raven Radio's two paid reporters, Southeast Alaska news from CoastAlaska, statewide news from the Alaska Public Radio Network, national news from National Public Radio, and international news from the BBC World Service. KCAW also airs a variety of American Public Media and Public Radio International programming as well as its own variety of locally produced shows, including the critically acclaimed soul and funk show, "Powerful Love".

KCAW also previously syndicated Encounters, a nature and wildlife-themed show hosted by Richard Nelson, statewide.

== Listening area ==
KCAW has a large listening area, by the means of translators, which include much of the western and northern portions of the Alaska Panhandle including Sitka, Angoon, Elfin Cove and the Fairweather fishing grounds, Kake, Pelican, Port Alexander, Tenakee Springs, and Yakutat. Raven Radio has roughly a 1,200-strong member base (listeners who donate money to the station).

== Translators ==
Broadcast translators of KCAW
Call sign	Frequency (MHz)	City of license	Facility ID	Class	ERP (W)
K288CZ	105.5	Angoon, Alaska	55221	D	23
K221EP	92.1	Elfin Cove, Alaska	141875	D	199
K296CX	107.1	Kake, Alaska	55218	D	30
K219BA	91.7	Pelican, Alaska	55222	D	51
K220CH	91.9	Port Alexander, Alaska	55215	D	37
K220BR	91.9	Tenakee Springs, Alaska	55212	D	66
K211BY	90.1	Yakutat, Alaska	55217	D	250

== See also ==
- List of community radio stations in the United States
