= Murray Apartments and Cottages =

Historic residential buildings in Alaska, United States

- U.S. National Register of Historic Places
- U.S. Historic district
- Alaska Heritage Resources Survey
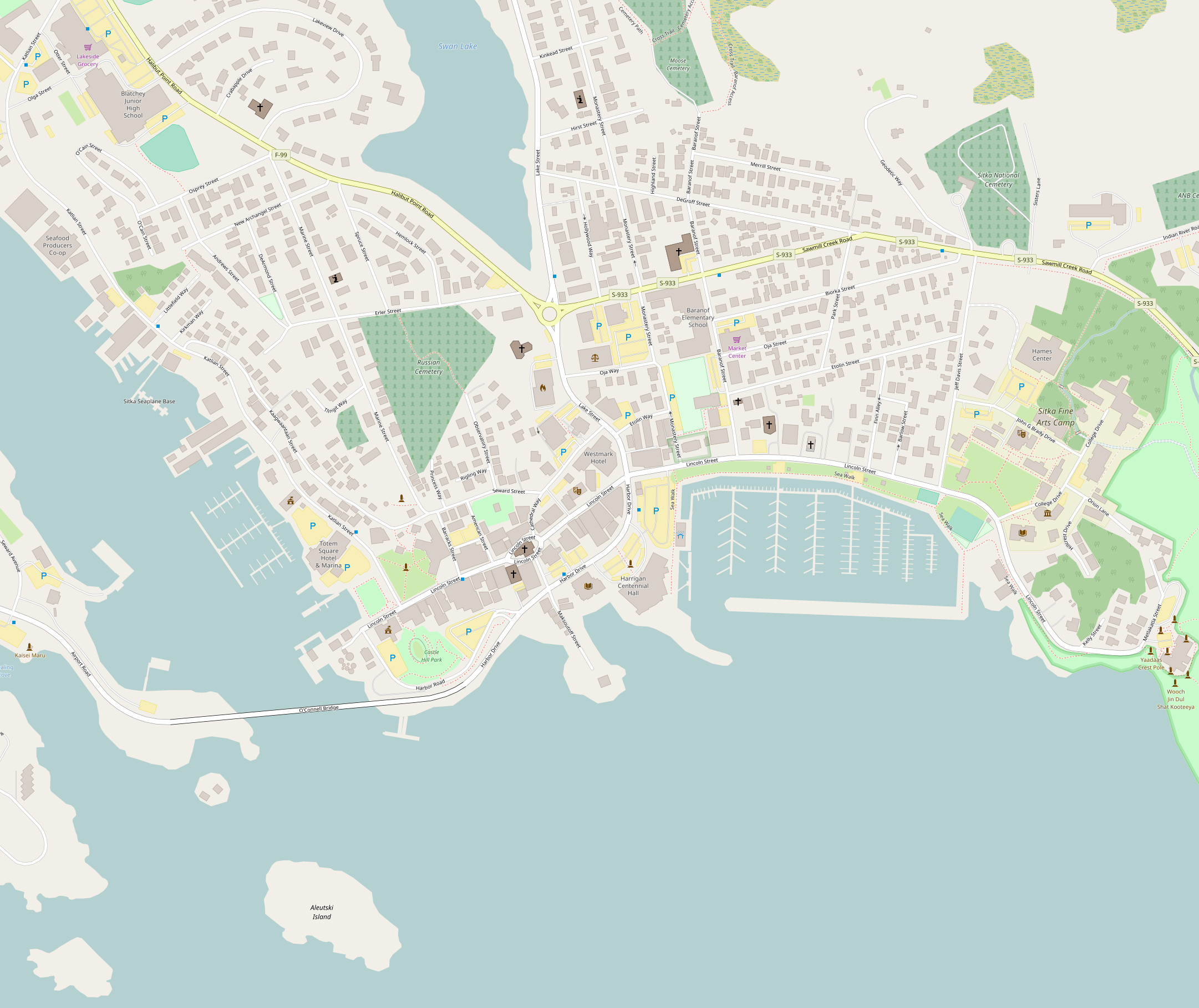
- Location within Downtown Sitka Location within Alaska
- Location: 200, 204 and 206 Seward Street, Sitka, Alaska
- Coordinates: 57°03′02″N 135°20′13″W
- Area: 1 acre (0.40 ha)
- Built: 1921
- Built by: Abner Murray
- NRHP reference No.: 92000402
- AHRS No.: SIT-208; SIT-209; SIT-210
- Added to NRHP: April 27, 1992

The Murray Apartments and Cottages are a small cluster of historic residential properties at 200, 204, and 206 Seward Street, on the edge of the business district of Sitka, Alaska. Two of the buildings are 1 1/2-story frame cottages, while the third (206 Seward), also known as the Murray Flats and the Baranof Apartments, is a 2 1/2-story frame structure housing four apartments. These buildings originally stood in Douglas, Alaska, and were disassembled and moved to Sitka in 1921 by Abner Murray. They represent the first buildings erected in Sitka specifically intended as residential housing rental units; the apartment house was the first multi-unit residential unit in Sitka to be built since the Alaska Purchase in 1867.

The properties were listed on the National Register of Historic Places in 1992.

== See also ==
- National Register of Historic Places listings in Sitka City and Borough, Alaska
