= US Coast and Geodetic Survey Seismological and Geomagnetic House =

Historic house in Alaska, United States

- U.S. National Register of Historic Places
- Alaska Heritage Resources Survey
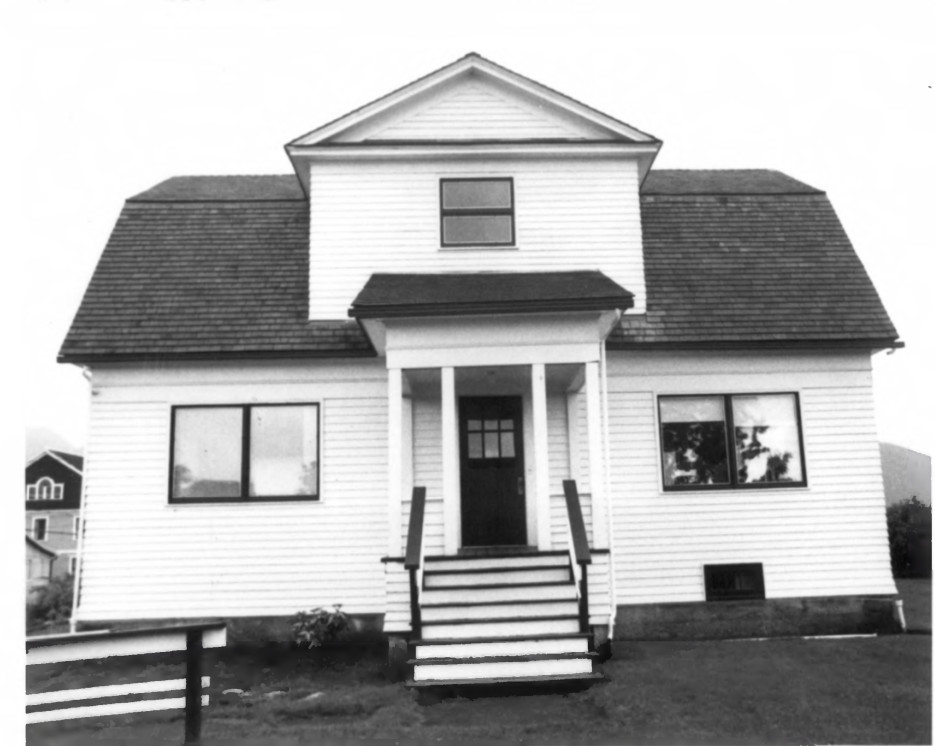
- 1985 United States Forest Service photo

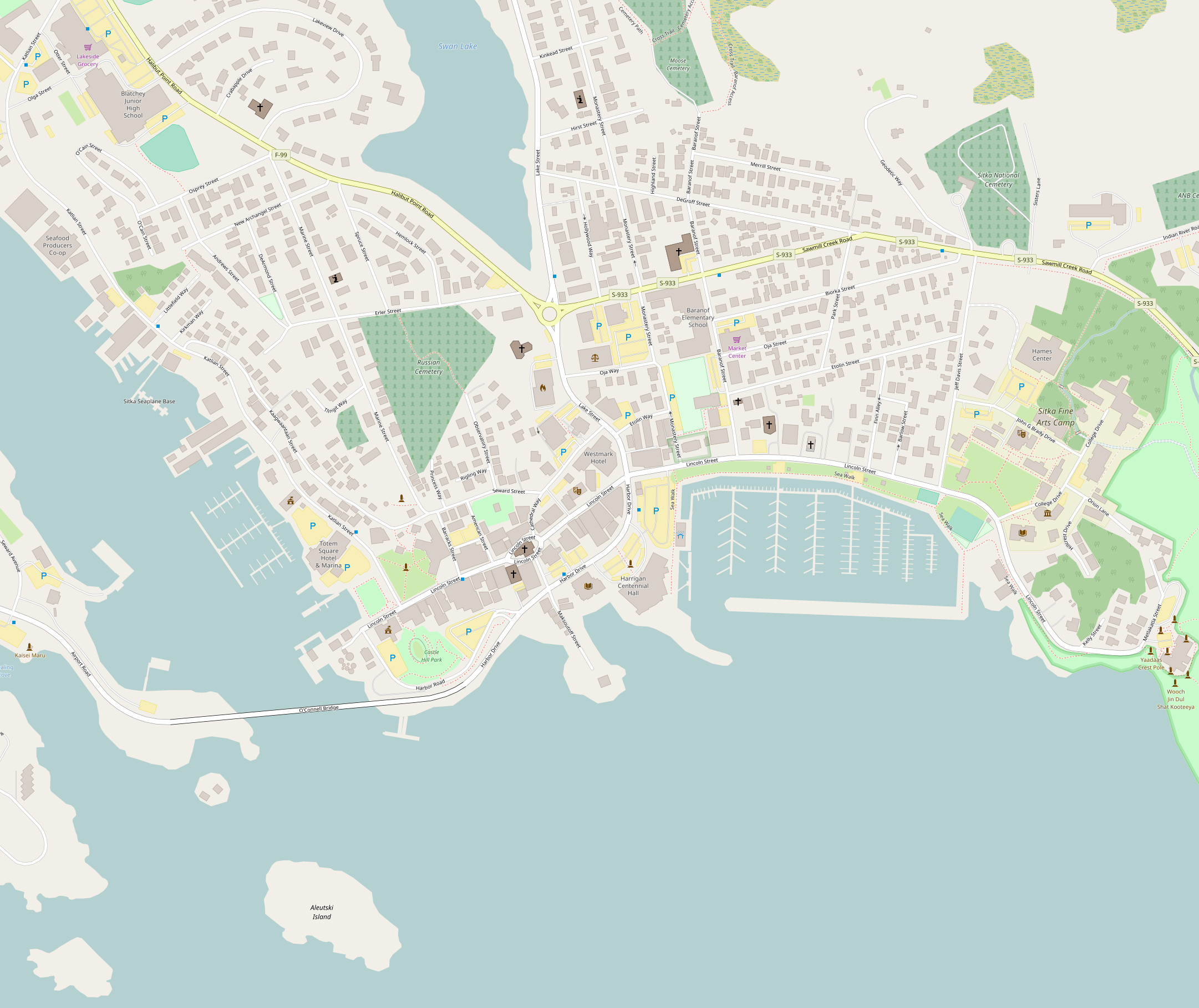
- Location within Downtown Sitka Location within Alaska Location within United States
- Location: 210 Seward Street, Sitka, Alaska
- Coordinates: 57°03′02″N 135°20′09″W
- Area: less than 1 acre (0.4 ha)
- Built: 1916
- Architectural style: Gambrel-roofed cottage
- NRHP reference No.: 86003234
- AHRS No.: SIT-194

Significant dates
- Added to NRHP: November 25, 1986
- Designated AHRS: March 7, 1977

The US Coast and Geodetic Survey Seismological and Geomagnetic House, also known as the Forest Service House, is a historic house at 210 Seward Street in Sitka, Alaska. Constructed by the United States Coast and Geodetic Survey in 1916, it has seen a variety of uses by the Coast and Geodetic Survey, United States Army Signal Corps, and United States Forest Service. It was placed on the National Register of Historic Places in 1986.

== Description ==
The house is a 26-by-36-foot (7.9 by 11.0 m) two-story wood-frame clapboard structure. The last surviving example of early-20th century cottage-style, gambrel-roofed architecture in Sitka, it has a full concrete basement built in bedrock. The roof has a dormer on its east and west sides. The house has a 7-by-8-foot (2.1 by 2.4 m) front porch and a 4-by-4-foot (1.2 by 1.2 m) back porch, both covered. Its exterior remains virtually unchanged from when it was constructed, and as of 1986 it was painted white with brown trim. As of 1986, some of the house's windows were original.

The house has seven rooms. It has three bedrooms and a bathroom in its upper story and a lower story with a kitchen, a combination living and dining room, and a room once used as a combination office and darkroom. There is now a half bath where the darkroom was. The living-dining room has a fireplace served by a single brick chimney. Apparently heated originally by a coal furnace, the house later was converted to oil heat.

== History ==
Before the United States purchased Russian America from the Russian Empire in 1867, a public garden known as the Russian Tea Garden occupied the site. In 1901, the Sitka Magnetic Observatory was established in Sitka in what by then was the District of Alaska as the first permanent geomagnetic observatory in Sitka, and in the summer of 1916 the United States Coast and Geodetic Survey, a component of the United States Department of Commerce, constructed the house to provide office space and living quarters for the observatory's staff. In 1922, the Coast and Geodetic Survey connected the house to the observatory with cables, allowing the observatory's staff to monitor the observatory's magnetometer from the house. In 1929, the Coast and Geodetic Survey moved the observatory's seismometer from the observatory, where it had operated since 1904, to the northwest corner of the house's basement. Capable of detecting movements in the earth's crust in the North Pacific Ocean, the seismometer gave the house a direct role in seismology as well.

The observatory, its offices, and the seismometer moved to a new site in Sitka farther to the northwest in 1940, and that year the house came under the control of the United States Army, whose Signal Corps used it in the Alaska Communications System. In 1954, the house was formally transferred to the Alaska Communications System, which remodeled it in 1958 for use as housing.

In 1961, the house was deeded to the United States Department of Agriculture, which used it to provide office space and living quarters for United States Forest Service personnel assigned to the Tongass National Forest, leading to the house's alternative name "Forest Service House." The Forest Service has used the building in a variety of ways since then; in 1986, for example, it was in use as a medical educational facility.

The house was listed on the National Register of Historic Places in on November 25, 1986.

== See also ==
- National Register of Historic Places listings in Sitka City and Borough, Alaska
