= W.P. Mills House =

Historic house in Alaska, United States

- W. P. Mills House
- U.S. National Register of Historic Places
- Alaska Heritage Resources Survey
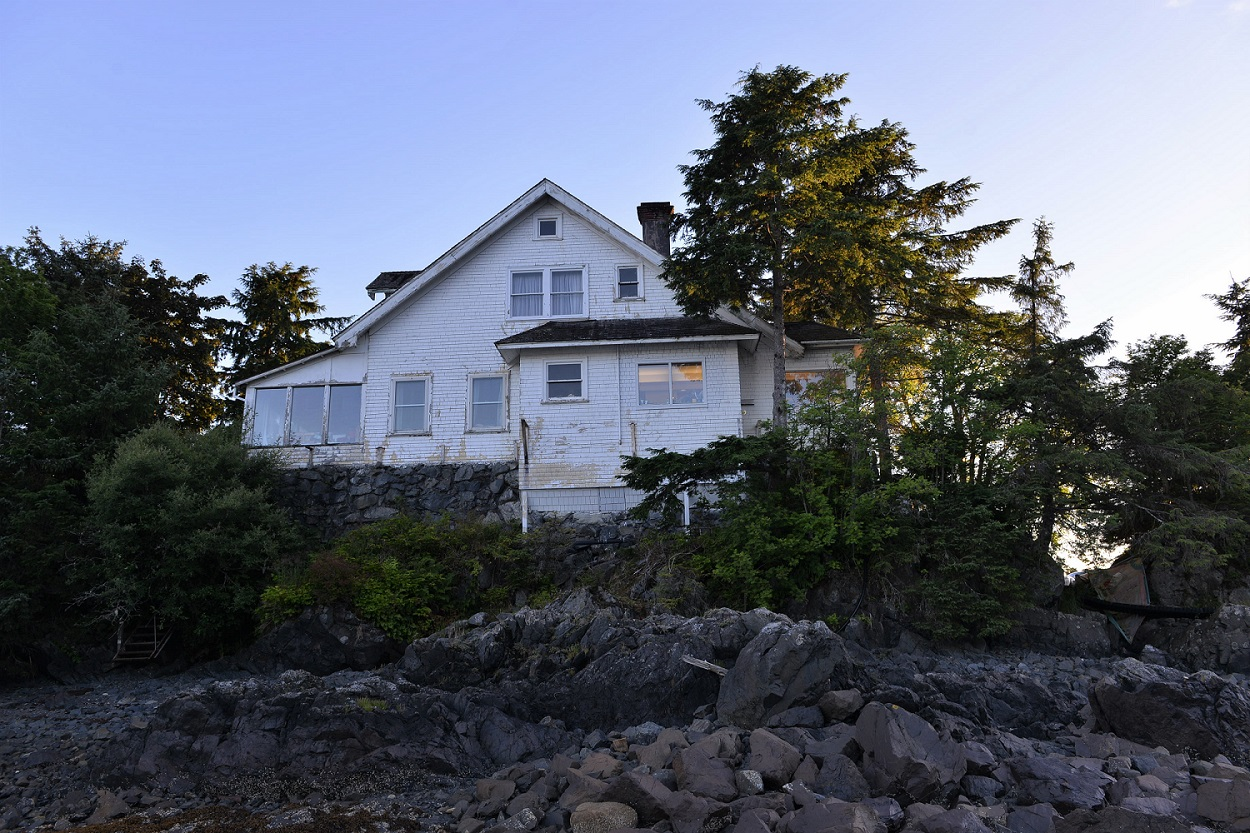

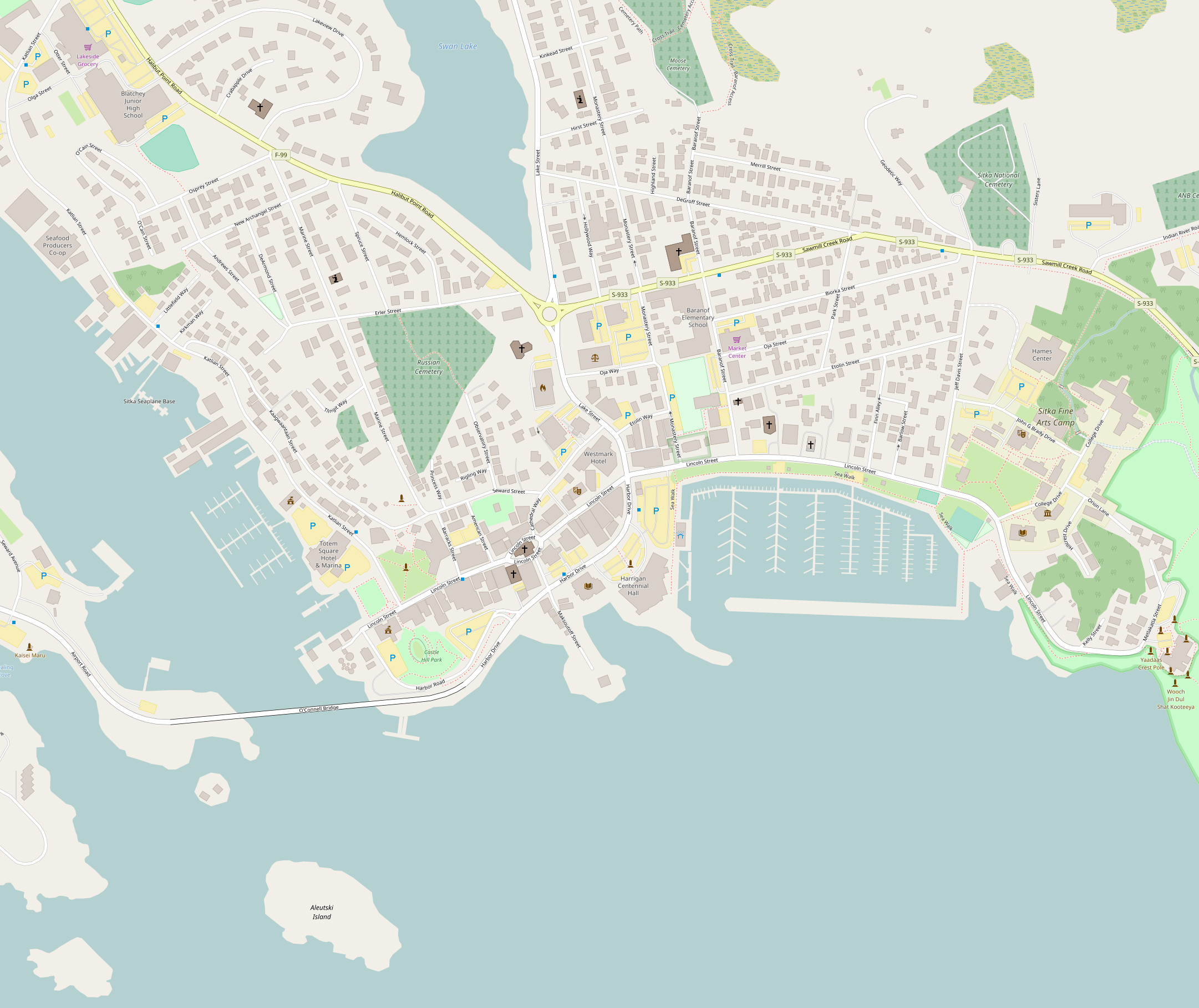
- Location within Downtown Sitka Location within Alaska
- Location: 1 Maksoutoff Street, Sitka, Alaska
- Coordinates: 57°02′54″N 135°20′00″W
- Area: less than one acre
- Built: 1916
- Built by: Tim Demedoff
- Architect: Louis L. Mendal
- NRHP reference No.: 77000226
- AHRS No.: SIT-025

Significant dates
- Added to NRHP: December 16, 1977
- Designated AHRS: October 27, 1972

The W.P. Mills House, also known as Cushing House, Longenbaugh House, Poulson House and Island House, is a historic house at 1 Maksoutoff Street in Sitka, Alaska. It occupies a prominent site in Sitka, located on a small island in the harbor at the end of a 400-foot (120 m) causeway. The house is located on the site where, during the Russian period in the early nineteenth century, a fish-packing operation was located. In 1915, W. P. Mills, son of one of the former American owners of the saltery after the Alaska Purchase, hired Seattle-based architect Louis L. Mendal to design a house to stand on the old saltery's foundation. The design, which used the foundation as well as the massive wooden door of the saltery, adapted the foundation to provide a sheltered and private courtyard space, and to take advantage of the expansive views available.

The house was listed on the National Register of Historic Places in 1977.

== See also ==
- National Register of Historic Places listings in Sitka City and Borough, Alaska
