= Sitka National Historical Park =

National Historical Park of the United States

- IUCN category V (protected landscape/seascape)
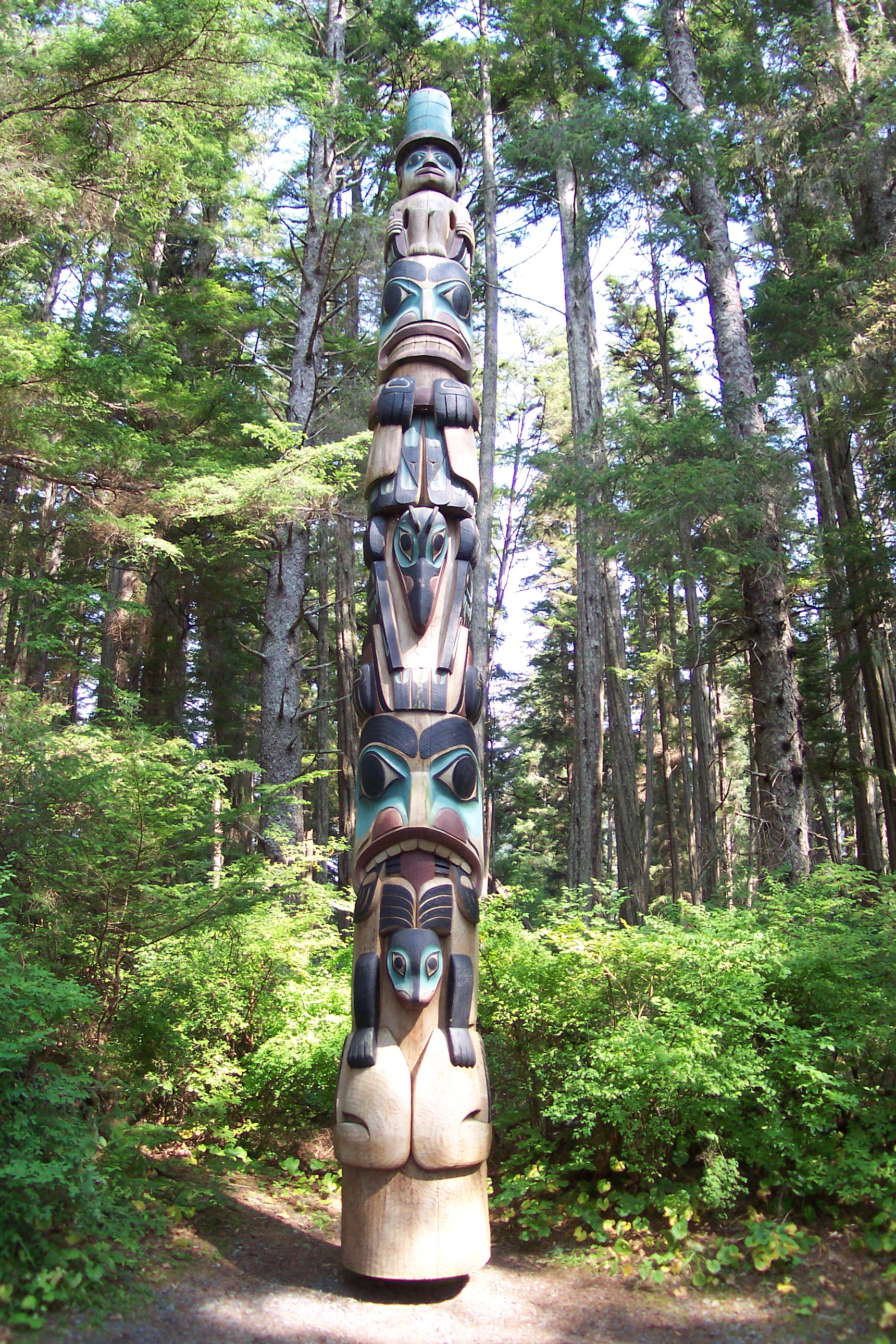
- The Yaadas Crest Corner Pole, one of the many replica totem poles on display at the Sitka National Historical Park. The figures (from top to bottom) are: the Village Watchman, the Raven in Human Form, the Raven, and a Bear.

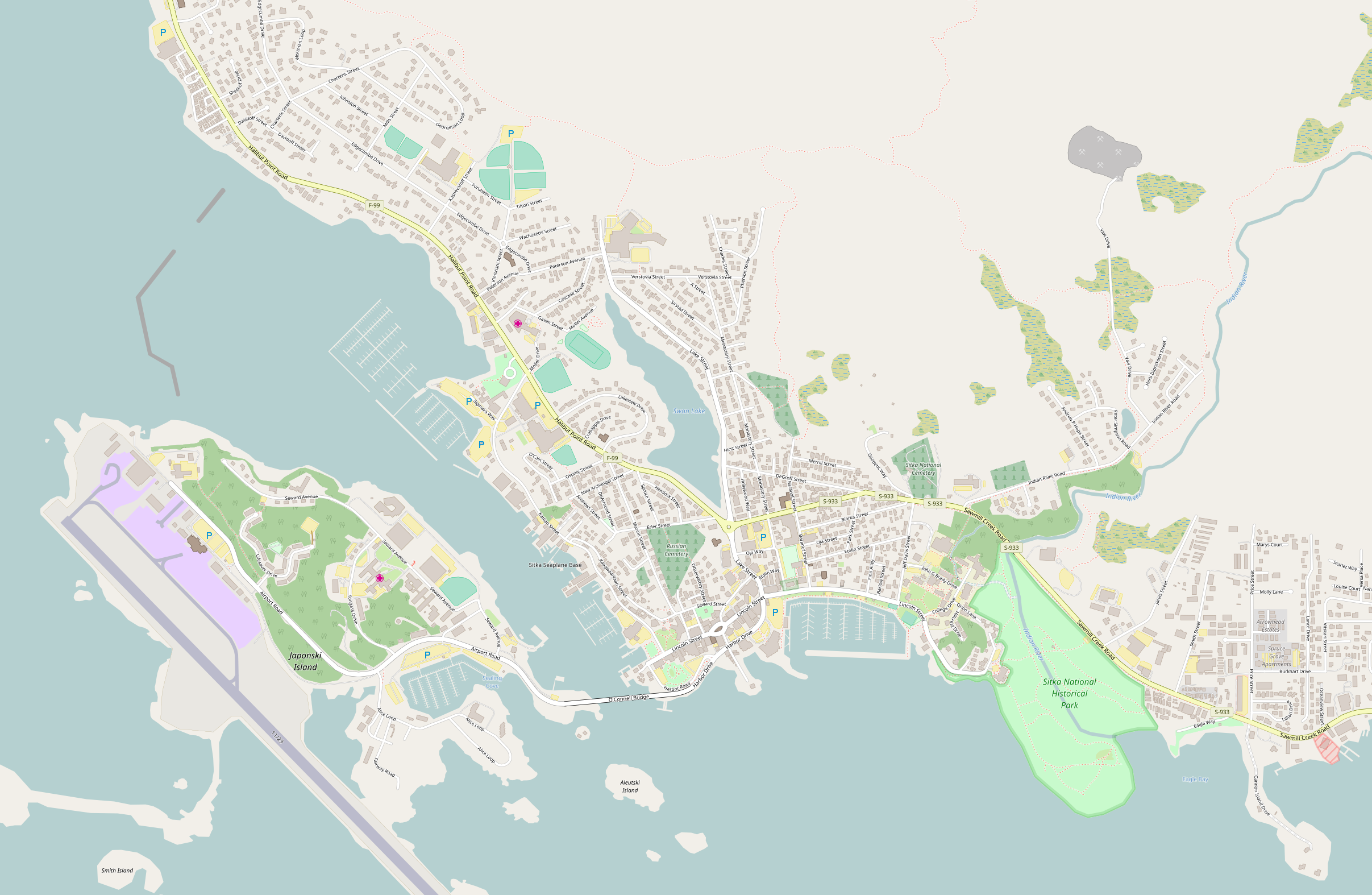
- Location within Alaska Location within Sitka
- Location: City and Borough of Sitka, Alaska, United States
- Coordinates: 57°02′56″N 135°18′57″W
- Area: 112 acres (45 ha)
- Established: October 18, 1972
- Visitors: 332,964 (in 2025)
- Governing body: National Park Service
- Website: Sitka National Historical Park
- Sitka National Historical Park
- U.S. National Register of Historic Places
- U.S. Historic district
- Alaska Heritage Resources Survey
- Location: 106 Metlakatla Street, Sitka, Alaska
- NRHP reference No.: 66000164
- AHRS No.: SIT-012
- Added to NRHP: October 15, 1966

Sitka National Historical Park (earlier known as Indian River Park and Totem Park) is a national historical park in Sitka, Alaska. It was redesignated as a national historical park from its previous status as national monument on October 18, 1972. The park in its various forms has sought to commemorate the Tlingit and Russian experiences in Alaska.

== History ==
The history of Alaska's oldest federally designated cultural and historic park dates back to June 21, 1890, when President Benjamin Harrison set aside the site of the Tlingit fort Shis'kí Noow (Tlingit for "Sapling Fort") for public use. The site, located near the mouth of the Indian River, served in 1804 as the location of an armed conflict between the native Tlingit people and Russian fur hunters (accompanied by their Aleut allies), known today as the Battle of Sitka.

From 1903 to 1905, District Governor John G. Brady set about acquiring Native totem poles from all over Alaska for display at the park; the majority of the poles came from Haida villages located on Prince of Wales Island, while others had been on display at the 1904 Louisiana Purchase Exposition. Shortly thereafter, a group of influential Sitkans concerned about vandalism and the poor condition of the park in general pressured the federal government to declare the site a national monument.

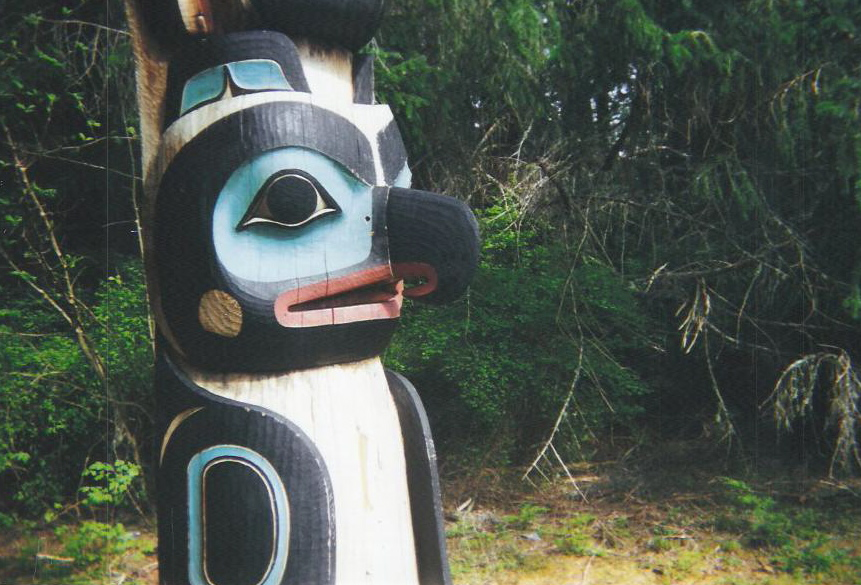
Detail of a raven head on a totem pole

The Sitka National Monument was proclaimed by President William H. Taft under the Antiquities Act on March 23, 1910 to preserve the fort site and totem pole collection and protect them from further harm. With the creation of the National Park Service in 1916, the monument fell under the new agency's care, though no significant appropriation was made until 1921. Many of the poles exhibited today along the park's two miles (3.2 kilometers) of wooded pathways are replicas of the deteriorating originals, now held in protective storage. Interspersed among the giant Sitka spruce trees are a variety of ferns, shrubs and flowers. Salmon can be seen swimming up Indian River during spawning season.

The 112-acre (45-hectare) park was placed under the control of the U.S. Army in 1942 and briefly occupied for defensive purposes, during which a series of military construction projects resulted in the removal of massive amounts of gravel from the park's river, shoreline and estuary. Environmental impacts from the gravel removal were to be a major resource issue for decades after. Responsibility for the park was formally returned to the Department of the Interior in 1947. In 1965, a new visitor center (the park's first true visitor facility which provides space for exhibits and demonstrations of Alaska Native arts and crafts) was opened. The park was added to the National Register of Historic Places in 1966.

In a groundbreaking arrangement, the Alaska Native Brotherhood assumed control of the demonstration program and established its focus on Southeast Alaska Native cultural arts in 1969; the Southeast Alaska Indian Cultural Center celebrated its 30th anniversary in January 2000. Many of the remarkable Tlingit artifacts in the collection were loaned or donated by local clans under agreements designed to ensure ongoing, traditional use.

== Russian Bishop's House ==
Located approximately one–half mile from the Park, the Russian Bishop's House was constructed out of native spruce in 1841-43 by Tlingit workers overseen by Finnish builders. It is one of only four surviving examples of Russian Colonial Style architecture in the Western Hemisphere.^{A} Bishop Innocent (Ivan Evseyevich Popov Veniaminov) of the Russian Orthodox Church, a clergyman, teacher and linguist, occupied the residence until 1853. The Church operated the facility as a school, residence, and place of worship for another century, until the dilapidated condition forced its abandonment in 1969 and sale in 1973 to the Park Service.

In 1973, the Park Service embarked on a 16–year restoration project to return the property to its former glory. Modern plumbing, heating, and electrical systems were installed, while at the same time keeping the structure as authentic as possible. The second floor was restored to its 1853 appearance, based on archaeological evidence and early diaries and drawings. Today, numerous exhibits and lavish icons in the Chapel of the Annunciation convey the legacy of Russian America.

The Russian Bishop's House is a National Historic Landmark; both it and the main area of the park are listed on the National Register of Historic Places.

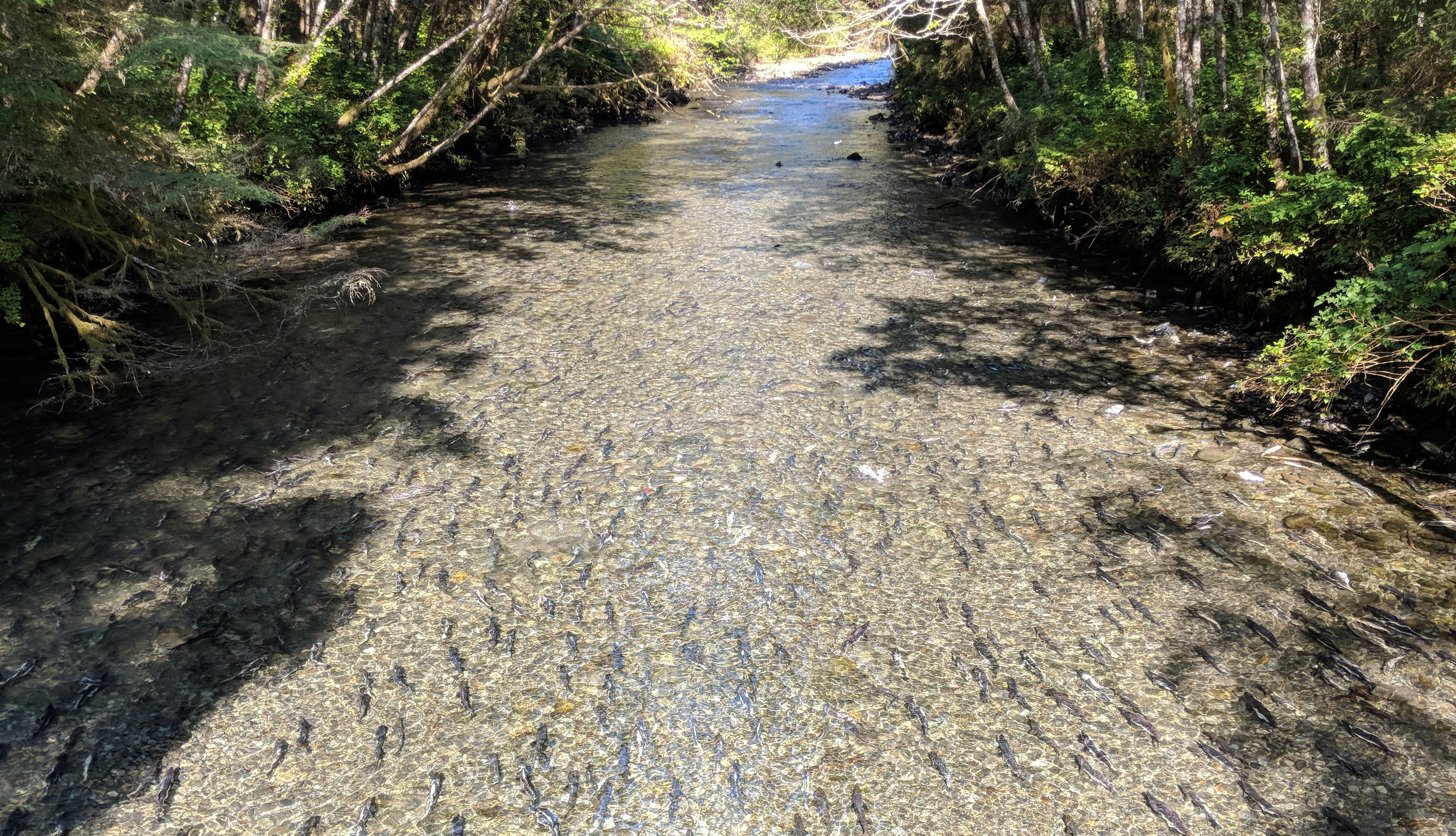
Pink salmon spawning in the Indian River, Sitka, AK, September 2018

== See also ==
- List of National Historic Landmarks in Alaska
- National Register of Historic Places listings in Sitka City and Borough, Alaska

== Note ==
^{A} Though some sources indicate that the Bishop's house is one of "four" remaining examples of Russian Colonial architecture in North America, the National Park Service more ambiguously suggests it is one of "few" remaining such examples.
