= Rocky Mills =

Historic house in Virginia, United States

- U.S. National Register of Historic Places
- Virginia Landmarks Register
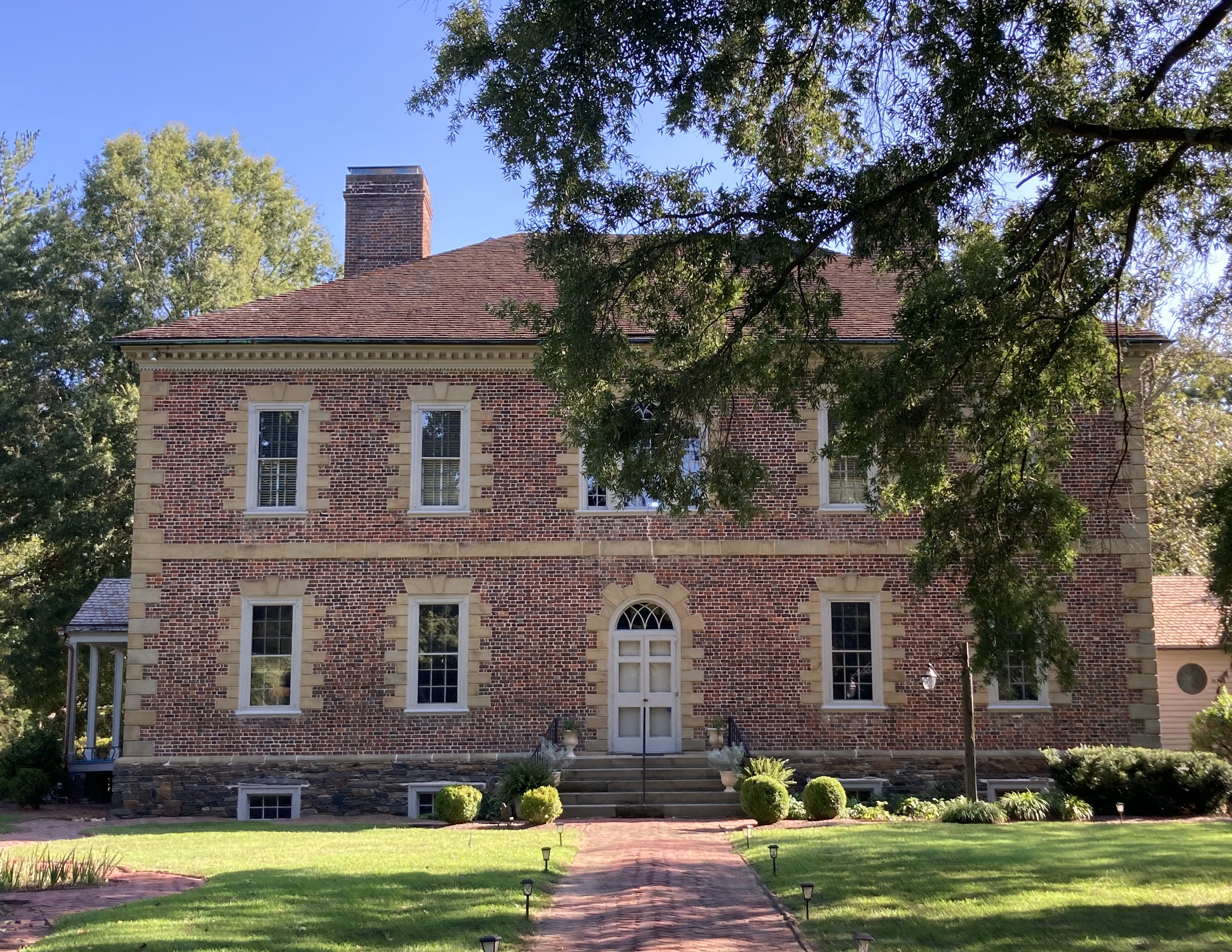
- North Face of Fairfield in 2023

- Location within Virginia Location within the United States
- Nearest city: 211 Ross Road; Richmond, Virginia
- Coordinates: 37°33′56″N 77°33′14″W
- Area: 7.8 acres (3.2 ha)
- Built: c. 1750; Relocated 1928
- Architect: H. Louis Duhring Jr.
- Architectural style: Georgian; Colonial Revival
- NRHP reference No.: 02000513
- VLR No.: 043-0005

Significant dates
- Added to NRHP: May 13, 2002
- Designated VLR: December 5, 2001

Rocky Mills, built c. 1750, was a Georgian mansion in Hanover County, Virginia. Disassembled and relocated about 21 miles to Henrico County, Virginia in 1928, it was reassembled and expanded by architect H. Louis Duhring Jr.

The woodwork and paneling of its rooms is particularly fine.

Now renamed "Fairfield," the property, including four contributing buildings, was listed on the National Register of Historic Places in 2002.

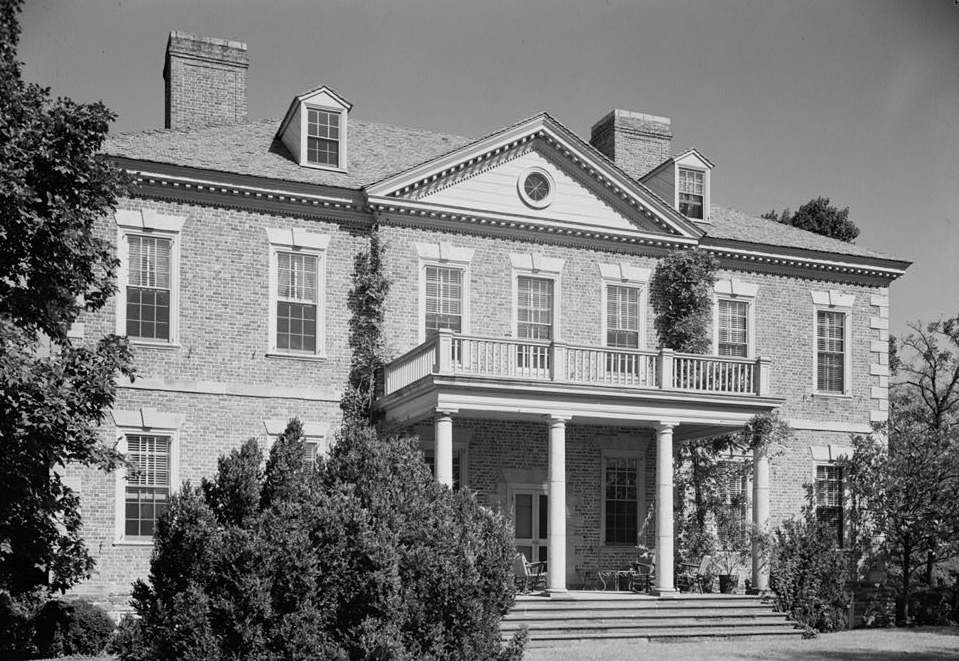
South Face of Fairfield in 1940
