= Sitka United States Post Office and Court House =

- Sitka U.S. Post Office and Court House
- U.S. National Register of Historic Places
- Alaska Heritage Resources Survey
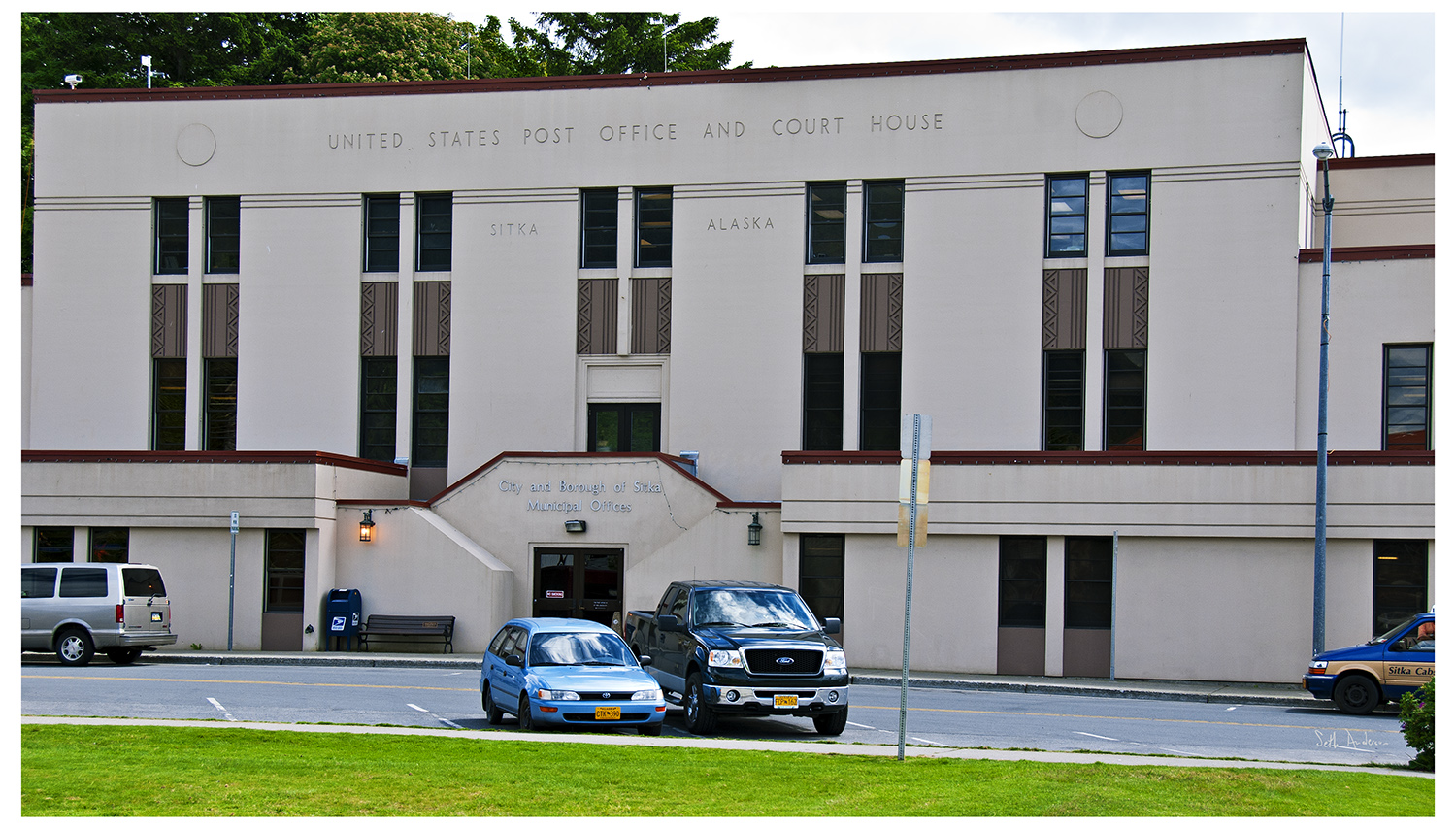

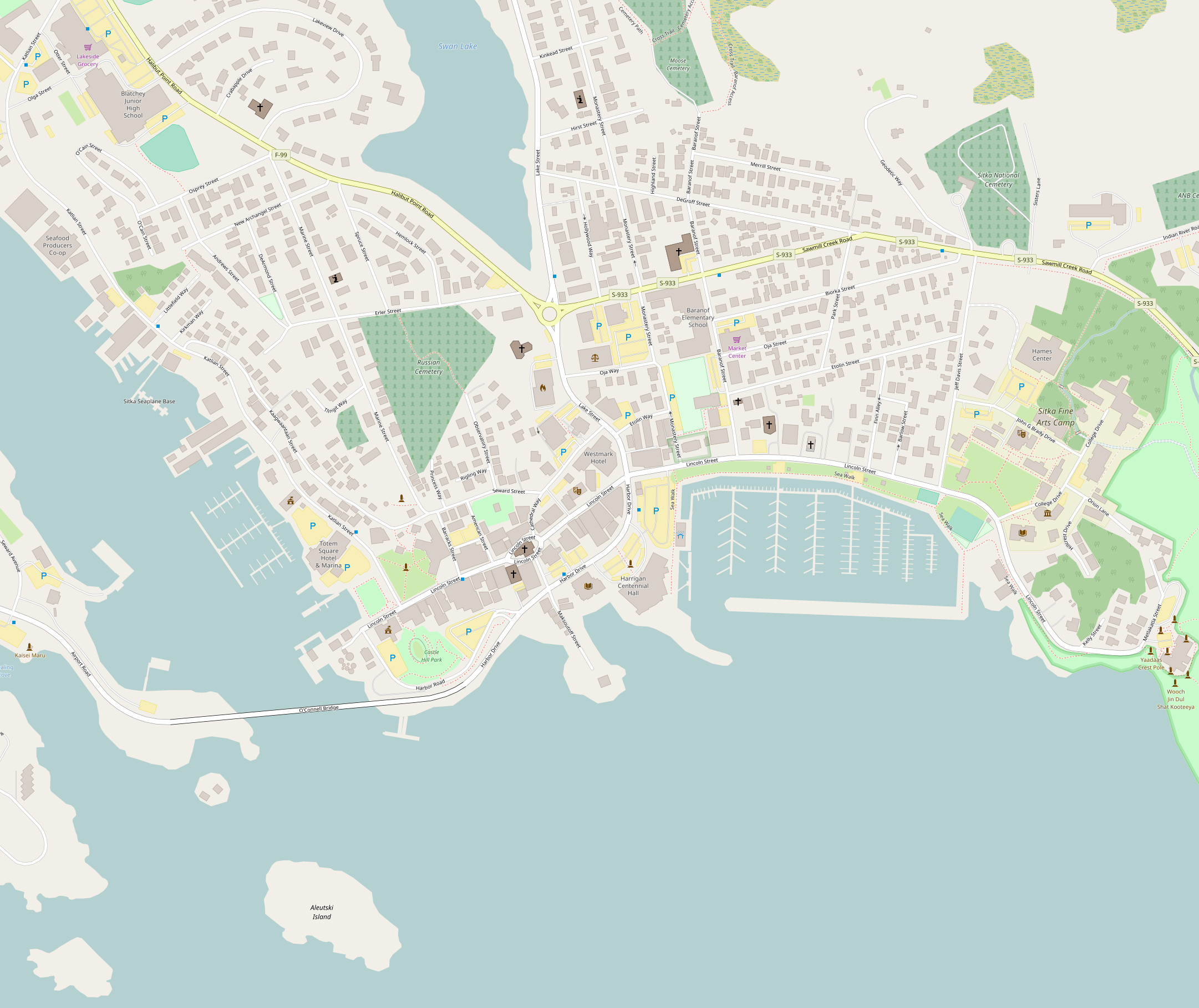
- Location within Downtown Sitka Location within Alaska
- Location: 100 Lincoln Street, Sitka, Alaska
- Coordinates: 57°02′56″N 135°20′19″W
- Area: less than one acre
- Built: 1938
- Built by: J.B. Warrack Company
- Architect: Gilbert Stanley Underwood
- Architectural style: Modern Movement, Moderne, Art Deco
- NRHP reference No.: 97001584
- AHRS No.: SIT-313
- Added to NRHP: December 31, 1997

The Sitka U.S. Post Office and Court House, also known as the Sitka Post Office and now serving as Sitka City Hall, is a Moderne style building located at 100 Lincoln Street in the center of Sitka, Alaska. One of eight Federal buildings constructed in the Alaska Territory in the 1930s, it was listed on the National Register of Historic Places in 1997.

It is a poured-concrete structure that is rectangular in shape, set on a raised basement. The reduced-width second level gives the building the appearance of having wings on either side. The building was historically accessed through an entry on the first floor, about 10 feet above street level, and accessed via symmetrically placed stairways. Its main entrance has since been relocated to the basement level. The main block is divided into five bays, each of which has slightly recessed windows, with a decorative panel between the first and second levels.

The building housed a number of federal offices, and housed the Sitka Public Library as well between 1938 and 1943. The post office took over the entire first floor in 1963, and was moved in 1986 to a location outside the city center, despite public protests. The building then sat vacant until the city took it over for use as city hall in 1993.

== See also ==
- National Register of Historic Places listings in Sitka City and Borough, Alaska
- List of United States post offices
