= Emmons House =

Historic house in Alaska, United States

- U.S. National Register of Historic Places
- Alaska Heritage Resources Survey
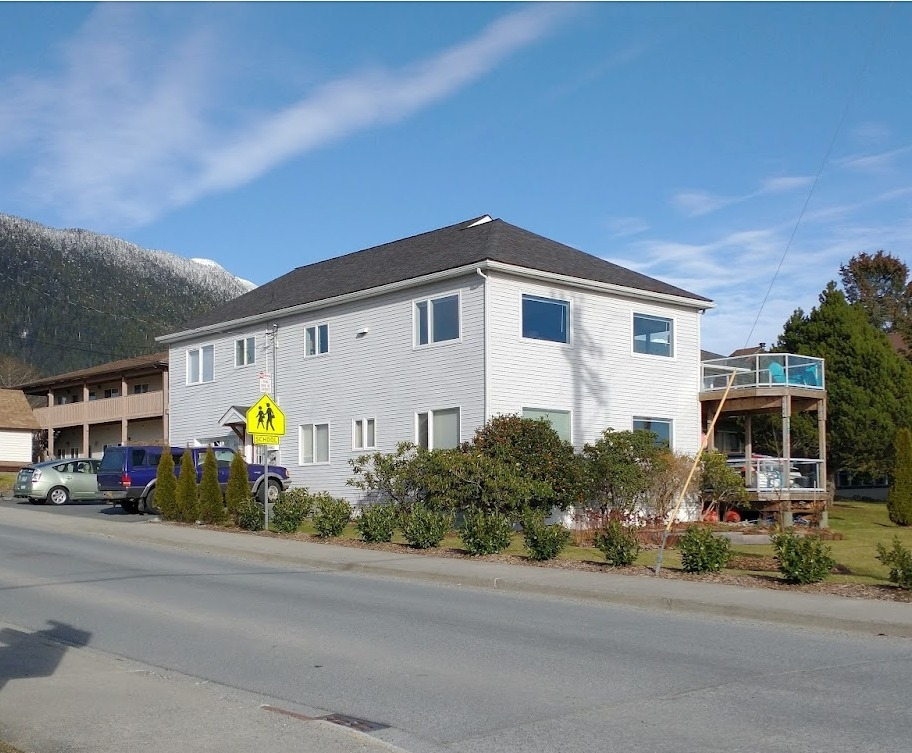
- Emmons House in 2023

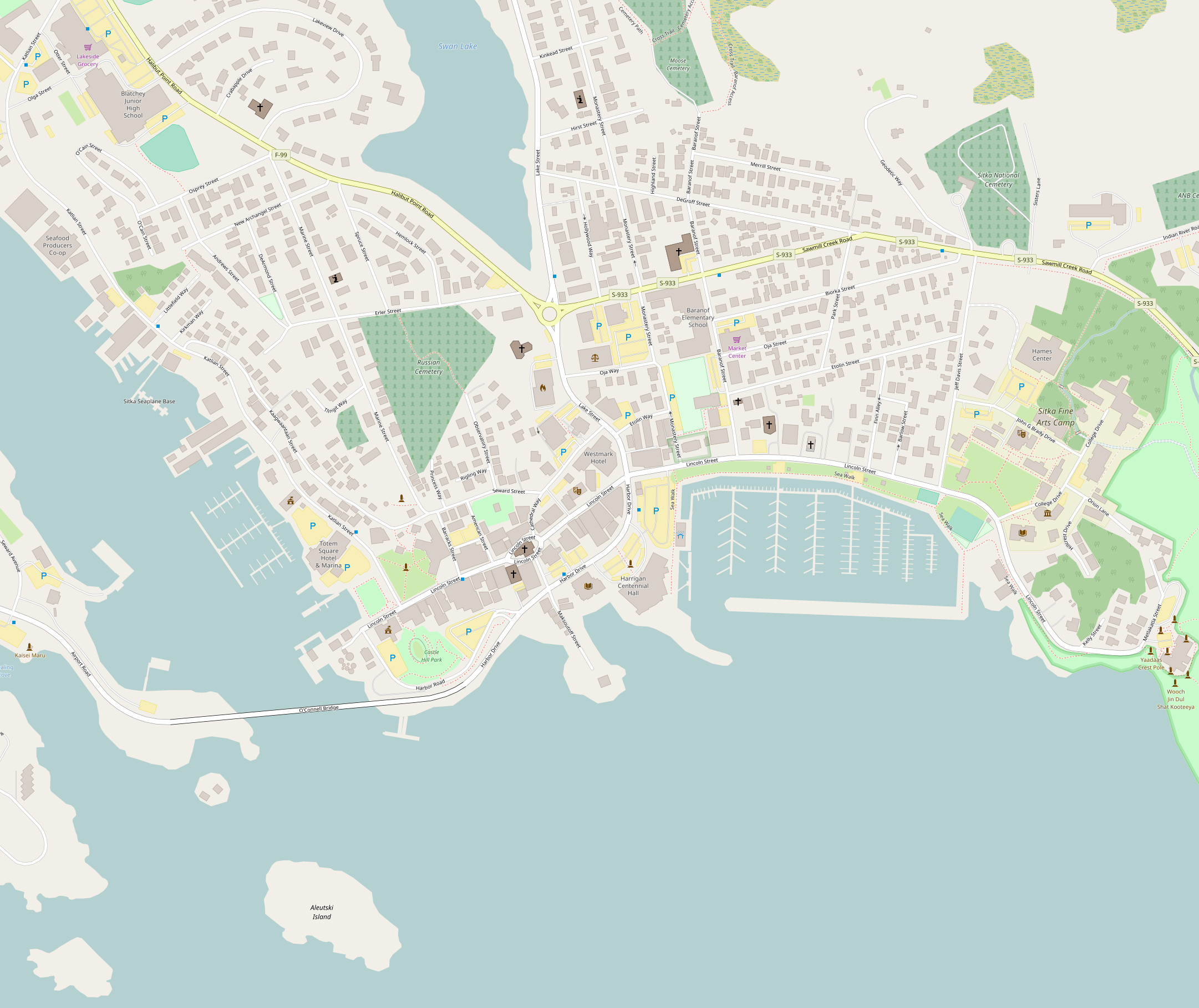
- Location within Downtown Sitka Location within Alaska
- Location: 601 Lincoln St. Sitka, Alaska
- Coordinates: 57°03′06″N 135°19′47″W
- Area: less than one acre
- Built: 1895
- Built by: Mr. Calsen
- NRHP reference No.: 77000224
- AHRS No.: SIT-030

Significant dates
- Added to NRHP: December 16, 1977
- Designated AHRS: February 11, 1977

The Emmons House is a historic house at 601 Lincoln Street in Sitka, Alaska. It is a two-story wood-frame structure, roughly 25 feet (7.6 m) square, with a hip roof. The house was built in 1895 by Lieutenant George T. Emmons, who became one of the foremost anthropologists of the Tlingit people. Emmons served in Sitka for only four years, but he amassed a large number of Tlingit artifacts, and frequently returned to the area to continue his research. This house is the only place in Alaska closely associated with his life.

The house was listed on the National Register of Historic Places in 1977.

== See also ==
- National Register of Historic Places listings in Sitka City and Borough, Alaska
