= Mills House (Sitka, Alaska) =

Historic house in Alaska, United States

- U.S. National Register of Historic Places
- Alaska Heritage Resources Survey
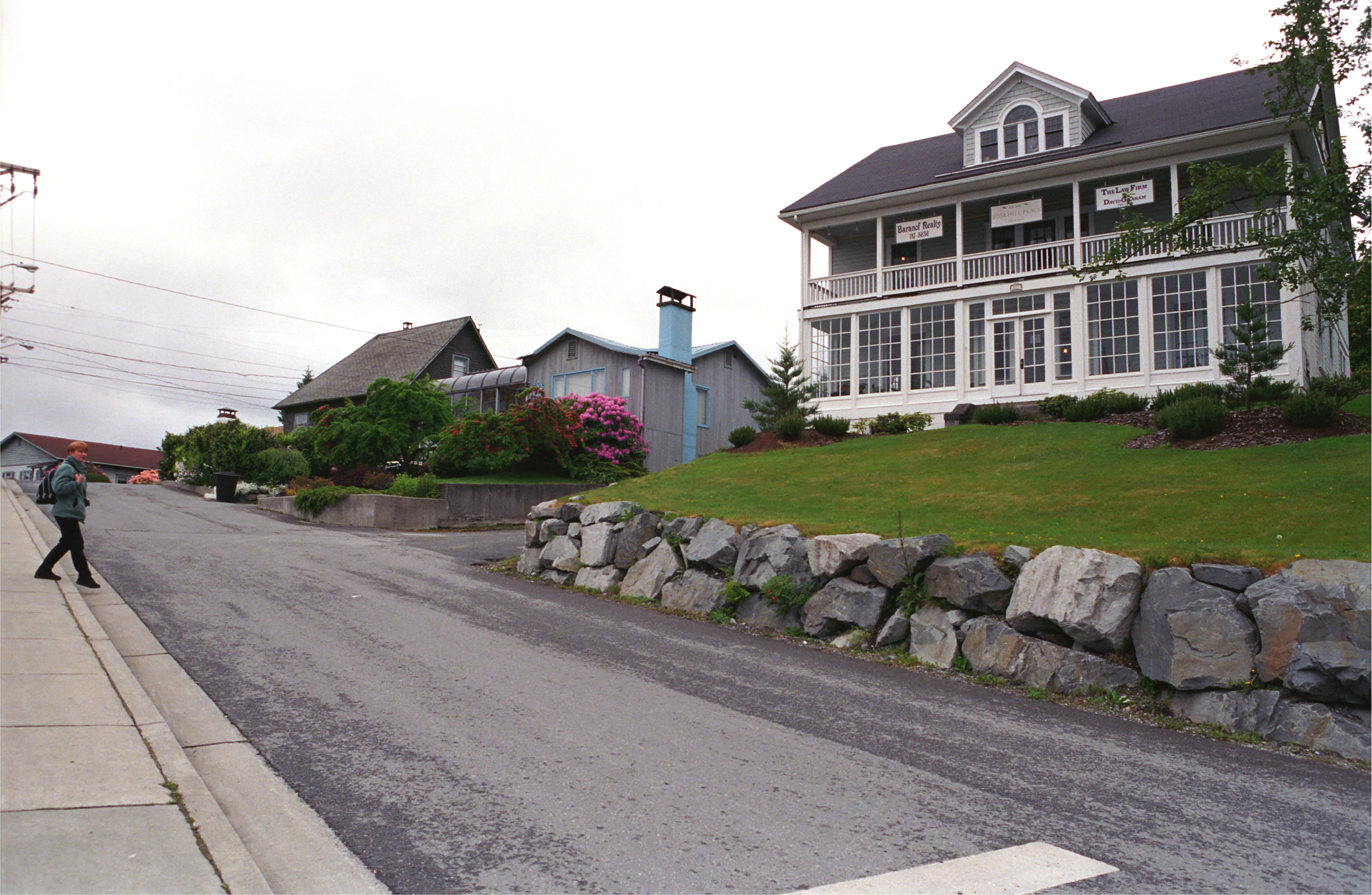

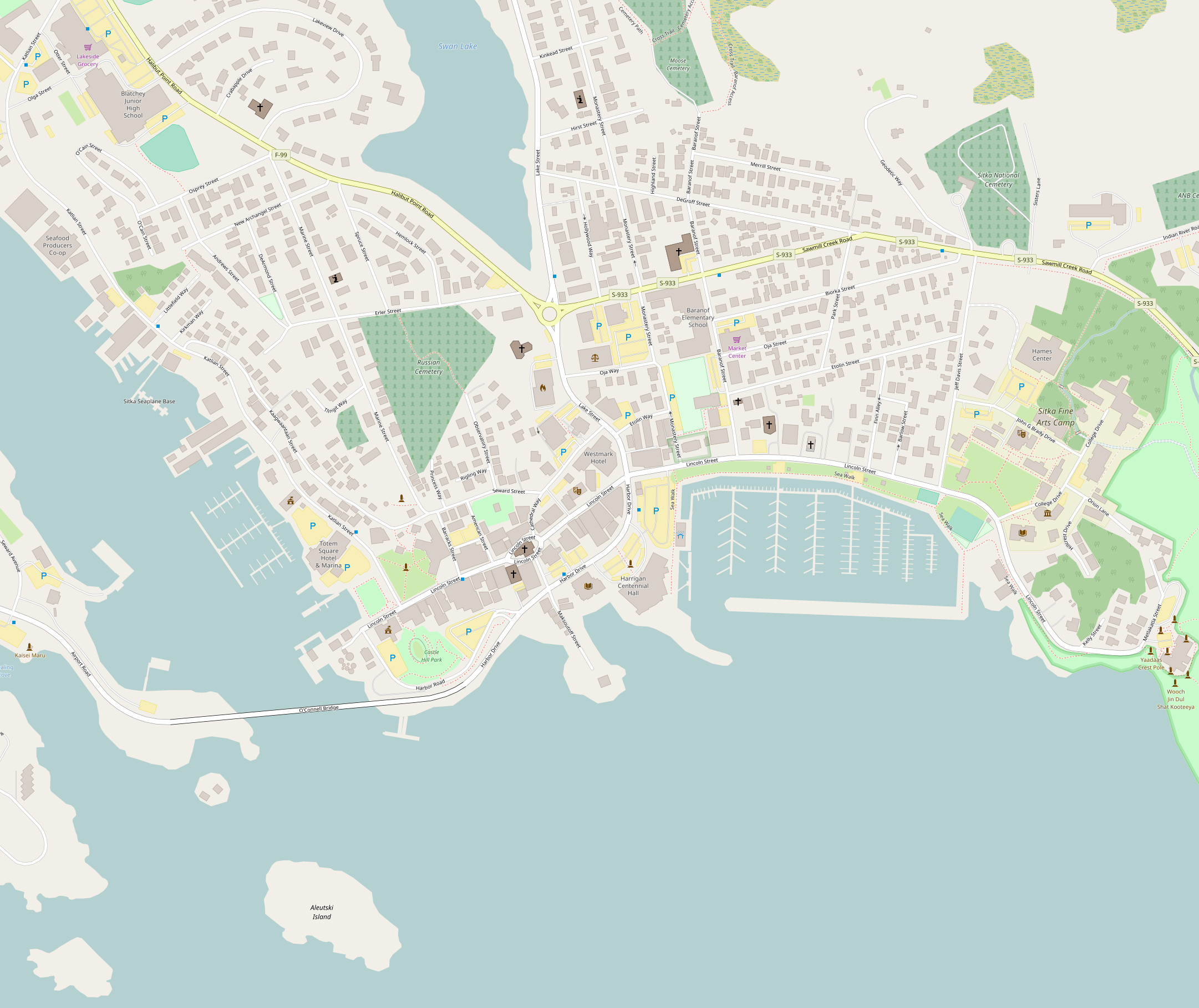
- Location within Downtown Sitka Location within Alaska
- Location: 315 Seward Street, Sitka, Alaska
- Coordinates: 57°03′04″N 135°20′07″W
- Area: less than one acre
- Built: 1913
- Architect: Clyde A. Maclaren
- Architectural style: early 20th-century cottage
- NRHP reference No.: 78000536
- AHRS No.: SIT-189

Significant dates
- Added to NRHP: January 31, 1978
- Designated AHRS: March 7, 1977

The Mills House, also known as the May Mills House and Rose Hill, is a historic house at 315 Seward Street in Sitka, Alaska. It is a two-story wood-frame structure, designed by Clyde Maclaren of Seattle, Washington for May Mills, the sister of businessman W. P. Mills, and built 1911–13. It is an excellent local example of Colonial Revival design, using the latest technologies of the day and well-adapted to a site offering expansive views of the area. Its internal technology includes an illumination system that could operate either on carbide gas or electricity, and it still has some of its original light fixtures.

The house was listed on the National Register of Historic Places in 1978.

== See also ==
- National Register of Historic Places listings in Sitka City and Borough, Alaska
