= St. Peter's by-the-Sea Episcopal Church (Sitka, Alaska) =

- St. Peter's Church
- U.S. National Register of Historic Places
- Alaska Heritage Resources Survey
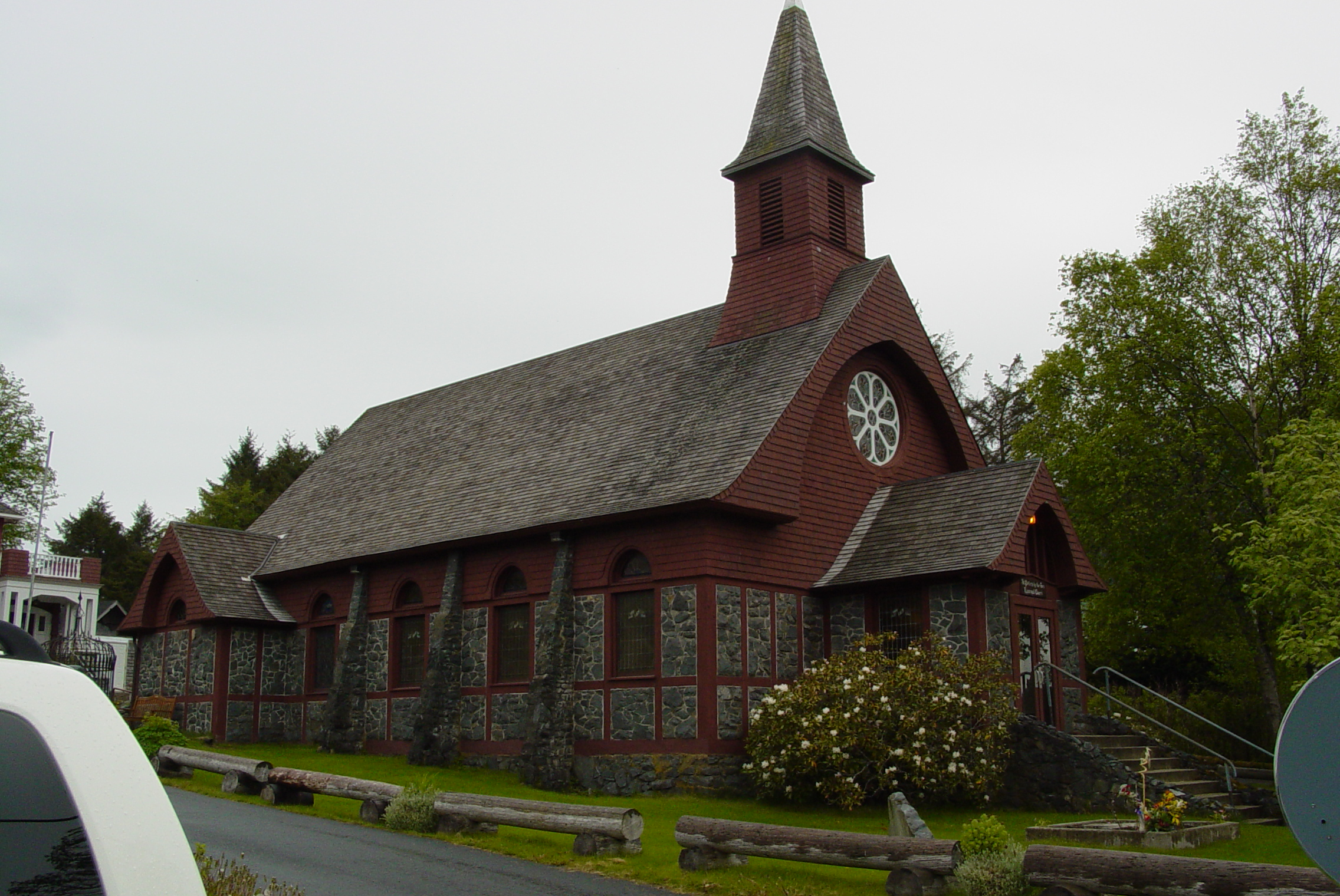

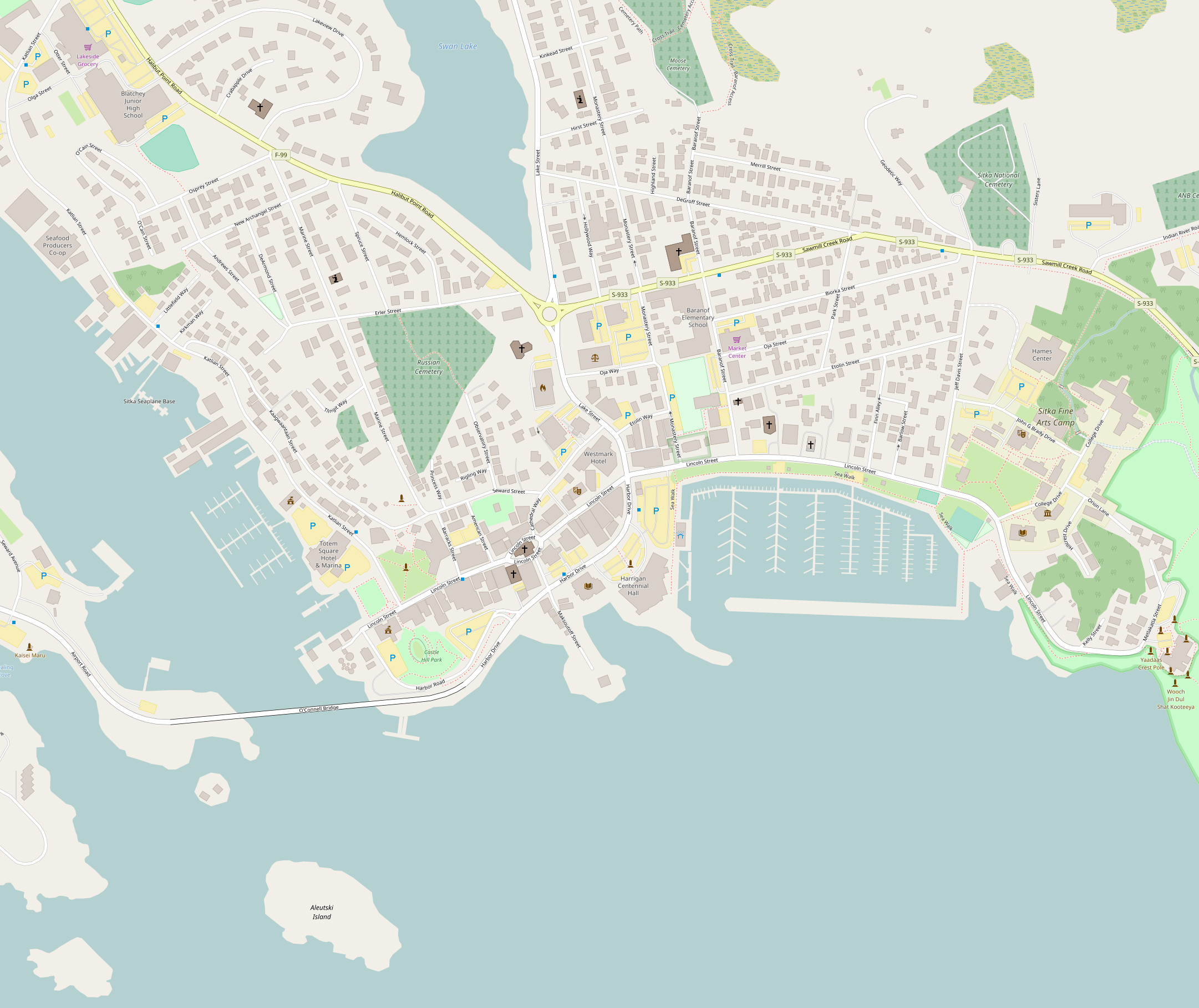
- Location within Downtown Sitka Location within Alaska
- Location: 611 Lincoln Street, Sitka, Alaska
- Coordinates: 57°03′05″N 135°19′41″W
- Area: less than one acre
- Built: 1899
- Built by: John W. Dudley
- Architect: H. Louis Duhring Jr.
- Architectural style: Gothic style
- NRHP reference No.: 78000538
- AHRS No.: SIT-029

Significant dates
- Added to NRHP: January 31, 1978
- Designated AHRS: October 24, 1972

St. Peter's by-the-Sea Episcopal Church, also known as St. Peter's by the Sea or St. Peter's Episcopal Church, is a historic church building at 611 Lincoln Street in Sitka, Alaska. The church reported 116 members in 2017 and 85 members in 2023; no membership statistics were reported in 2024 parochial reports. Plate and pledge income for the congregation in 2024 was $150,765 with average Sunday attendance (ASA) of 30.

It is a Gothic Revival structure, built of stone and wood, with a modest bell tower topped by a pyramidal roof. The basement and more than half of the main floor's height are fieldstone with timbered elements, above which is wood framing clad in wooden shingles. Three stone buttresses line the side of the church, separating four rectangular windows with half-round windows directly above. The rose window of the church includes a Star of David. The church was built in 1899, and was the first substantial Episcopal church in Sitka, which had previously held services in smaller locations.

The church was listed on the National Register of Historic Places (as "St. Peter's Church") in 1978. The adjoining See House is separately listed on the National Register.

== See also ==
- National Register of Historic Places listings in Sitka City and Borough, Alaska
