= Hanlon-Osbakken House =

Historic house in Alaska, United States

- U.S. National Register of Historic Places
- Alaska Heritage Resources Survey
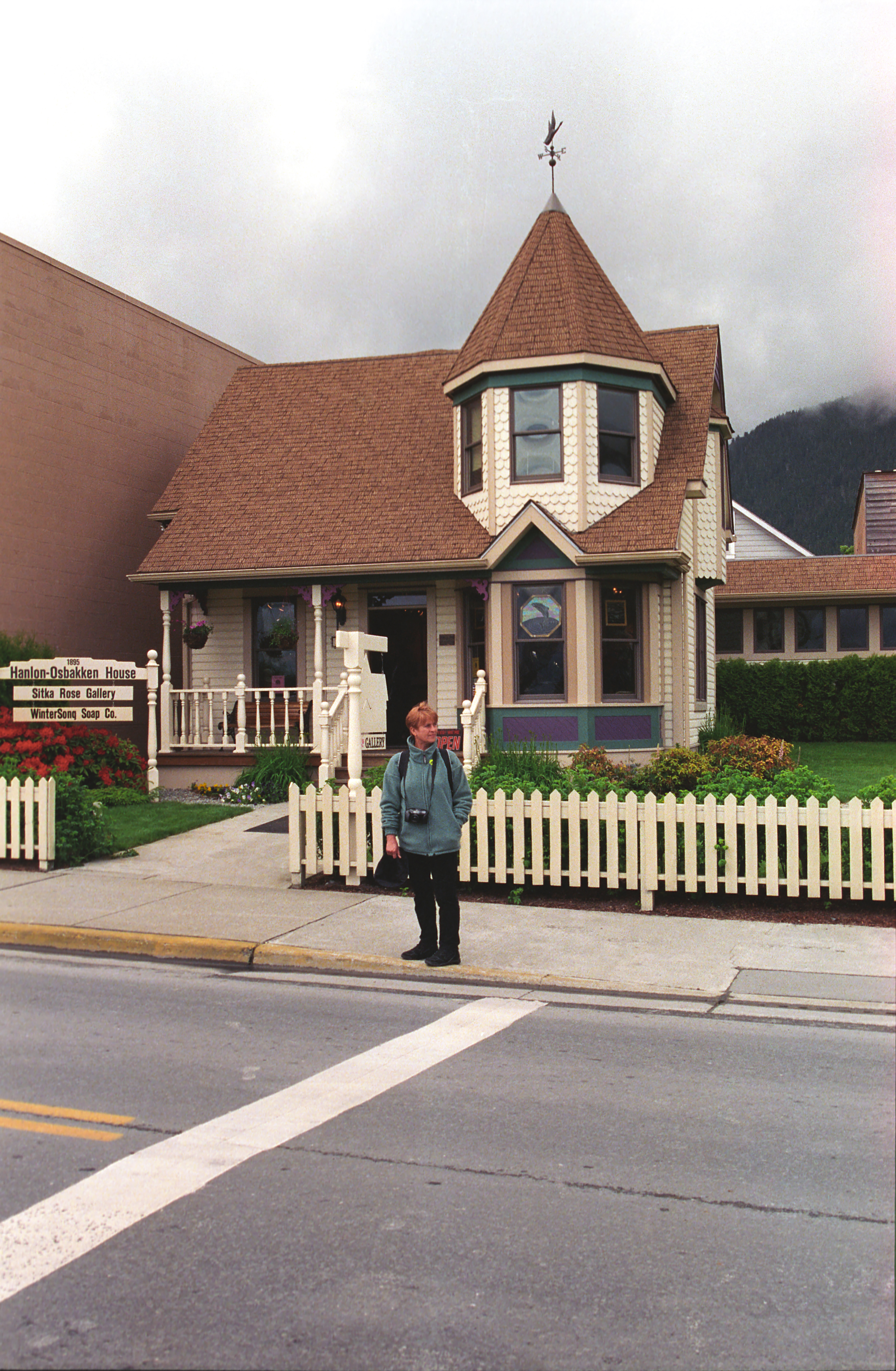

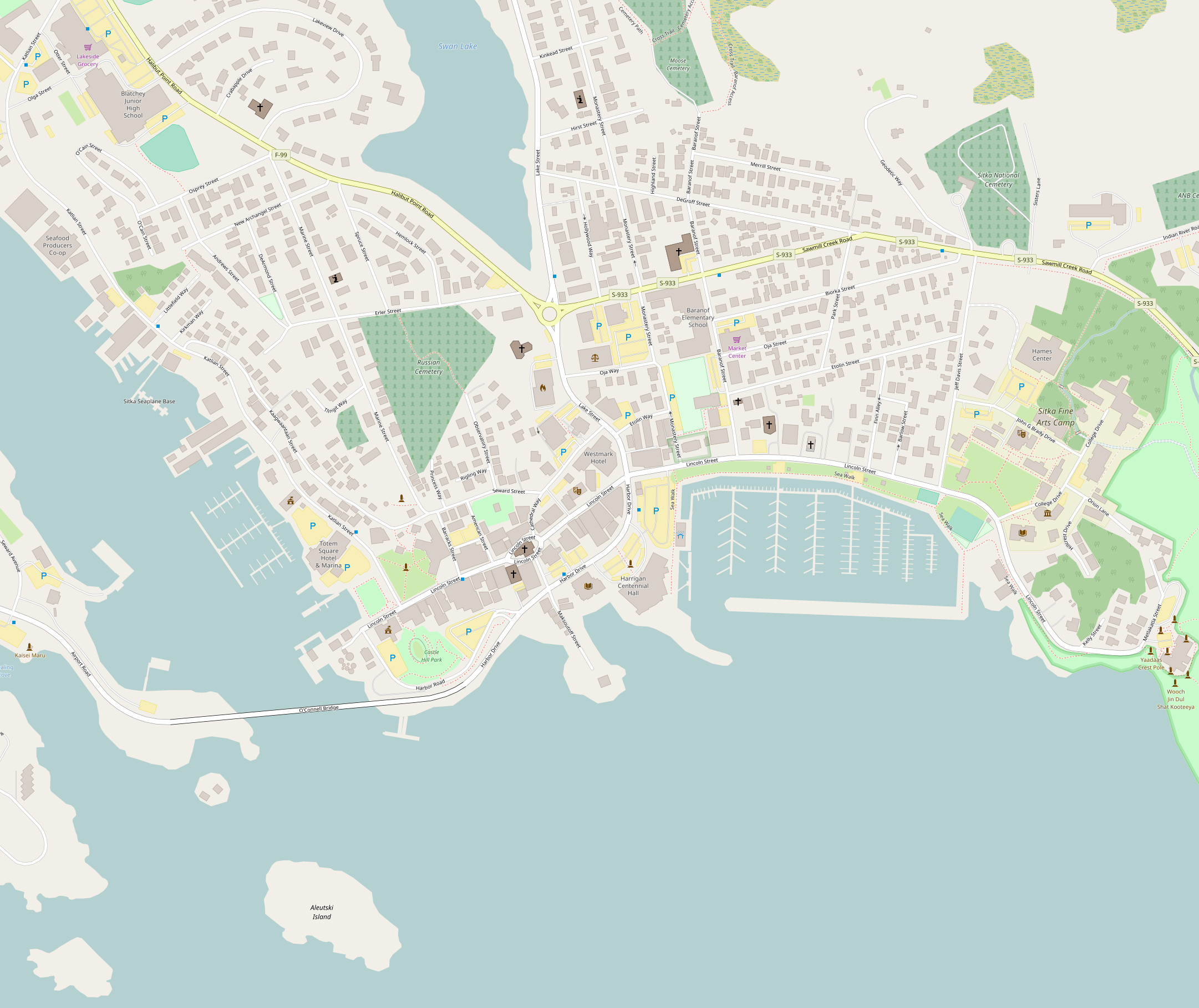
- Location within Downtown Sitka Location within Alaska
- Location: 419 Lincoln Street, Sitka, Alaska
- Coordinates: 57°03′05″N 135°19′54″W
- Area: less than one acre
- Built: 1896
- Built by: William Basil Sherigan
- Architectural style: Queen Anne
- NRHP reference No.: 92000404
- AHRS No.: SIT-191
- Added to NRHP: April 27, 1992

The Hanlon-Osbakken House, also known as the Osbakken House, is a historic house at 419 Lincoln Street in Sitka, Alaska. Built c. 1892–1896, this two-story wood-frame structure is one only two surviving Queen Anne Victorian buildings in the city. It has a side-gable roof which extends down to the first floor on the left side of the main facade, sheltering a porch. On the right side, there is a projecting bay window on the first floor, above which rises an octagonal tower-like dormer topped by a pyramidal roof. The house was originally built as a rectangular block with a center hall plan, but this was turned into an L shape by an 1896 addition at the rear. The house was built by William Basil Sherigan for his sister-in-law Anna and her husband, John Hanlon. Their daughter, Margaret Hanlon Osbakken, lived in the house until 1991.

The house was listed on the National Register of Historic Places in 1992.

== See also ==
- National Register of Historic Places listings in Sitka City and Borough, Alaska
