= National Register of Historic Places listings in Sitka, Alaska =

Location of Sitka in Alaska

This is a list of the National Register of Historic Places listings in Sitka, Alaska.

This is intended to be a complete list of the properties and districts on the National Register of Historic Places in Sitka, Alaska, United States. The locations of National Register properties and districts for which the latitude and longitude coordinates are included below, may be seen in an online map.

There are 22 properties and districts listed on the National Register in the city and borough, including 8 National Historic Landmarks. Another property was once listed but has been removed.

This National Park Service list is complete through NPS recent listings posted September 18, 2026.

== Current listings ==
	Name on the Register	Image	Date listed	Location	City or town	Description
1	Alaska Native Brotherhood Hall	Alaska Native Brotherhood Hall	February 23, 1972 (#72000192)	235 Katlian Street; 57°03′03″N 135°20′28″W	Sitka	
2	American Flag Raising Site	American Flag Raising Site	October 15, 1966 (#66000162)	On Castle Hill; 57°02′55″N 135°20′16″W	Sitka	
3	Cable House and Station	Cable House and Station	June 4, 1979 (#79000412)	2 Lincoln Street; 57°02′55″N 135°20′21″W	Sitka	
4	Emmons House	Emmons House	December 16, 1977 (#77000224)	601 Lincoln Street; 57°03′06″N 135°19′47″W	Sitka	
5	Hanlon-Osbakken House	Hanlon-Osbakken House	April 27, 1992 (#92000404)	419 Lincoln Street; 57°03′05″N 135°19′54″W	Sitka	
6	Mills House	Mills House	January 31, 1978 (#78000536)	315 Seward Street; 57°03′04″N 135°20′07″W	Sitka	
7	W.P. Mills House	W.P. Mills House	December 16, 1977 (#77000226)	1 Maksoutoff Street; 57°02′54″N 135°20′00″W	Sitka	
8	Murray Apartments and Cottages	Murray Apartments and Cottages	April 27, 1992 (#92000402)	200, 204, and 206 Seward Street; 57°03′02″N 135°20′13″W	Sitka	
9	Old Sitka Site	Old Sitka Site	October 15, 1966 (#66000166)	Mile 6.9 of Halibut Point Road, about 6 miles (9.7 km) north of Sitka; 57°07′46″N 135°22′24″W	Sitka	Also known as the Redoubt St. Archangel Michael Site
10	Russian Bishop's House	Russian Bishop's House	October 15, 1966 (#66000025)	501 Lincoln Street; 57°03′05″N 135°19′52″W	Sitka	1841-1843 log house, built for the first Russian Orthodox Bishop of Alaska; now a unit of Sitka National Historical Park.
11	Russian-American Building No. 29	Russian-American Building No. 29	May 28, 1987 (#87001282)	202-206 Lincoln Street; 57°02′59″N 135°20′11″W	Sitka	
12	St. Michael's Cathedral	St. Michael's Cathedral	October 15, 1966 (#66000165)	240 Lincoln Street; 57°03′00″N 135°20′06″W	Sitka	
13	St. Peter's Church	St. Peter's Church	January 31, 1978 (#78000538)	611 Lincoln Street; 57°03′05″N 135°19′41″W	Sitka	
14	See House	See House	March 30, 1978 (#78000537)	611 Lincoln Street, behind St. Peter's Church; 57°03′07″N 135°19′41″W	Sitka	
15	Sheldon Jackson School	Sheldon Jackson School	February 23, 1972 (#72000193) (Note: While the form 72000193 contains 2001 NHLD designation for the entire Sheldon Jackson School, the asset detail page reference the original Sheldon Jackson Museum 1972 single-property enlistment.)	801 Lincoln Street; 57°03′03″N 135°19′25″W	Sitka	
16	Sitka National Cemetery	Sitka National Cemetery	March 7, 2012 (#12000057)	803 Sawmill Creek Road; 57°03′18″N 135°19′25″W	Sitka	
17	Sitka National Historical Park	Sitka National Historical Park	October 15, 1966 (#66000164)	106 Metlakatla Street; 57°02′56″N 135°18′57″W	Sitka	
18	Sitka Naval Operating Base and US Army Coastal Defenses	Sitka Naval Operating Base and US Army Coastal Defenses	August 11, 1986 (#86003559)	Japonski Island, Makhnati Island and the causeway connecting them 57°02′58″N 135°21′35″W	Sitka	
19	Sitka Pioneers' Home	Sitka Pioneers' Home	October 18, 1979 (#79000413)	120 Katlian Street; 57°03′00″N 135°20′15″W	Sitka	
20	Sitka US Post Office and Court House	Sitka US Post Office and Court House	December 31, 1997 (#97001584)	100 Lincoln Street; 57°02′56″N 135°20′19″W	Sitka	
21	Sitka Woman's Club Building		October 15, 2024 (#100010895)	300 Harbor Drive; 57°02′57″N 135°20′03″W	Sitka	
22	US Coast and Geodetic Survey Seismological and Geomagnetic House	US Coast and Geodetic Survey Seismological and Geomagnetic House	November 25, 1986 (#86003234)	210 Seward Street; 57°03′02″N 135°20′09″W	Sitka	

== Former listing ==
	Name on the Register	Image	Date listed	Date removed	Location	City or town	Description
1	Government School		December 12, 1977 (#77000225)	March 12, 1986	456 Katlian Street; 57°03′13″N 135°20′36″W	Sitka	Building now hosting the Sheet'ka Kwaan Naa Kahidi Tribal Community House.

== See also ==
- List of National Historic Landmarks in Alaska
- National Register of Historic Places listings in Alaska
