= Church of the Redeemer (Longport, New Jersey) =

Historic church in New Jersey, United States

- U.S. National Register of Historic Places
- New Jersey Register of Historic Places
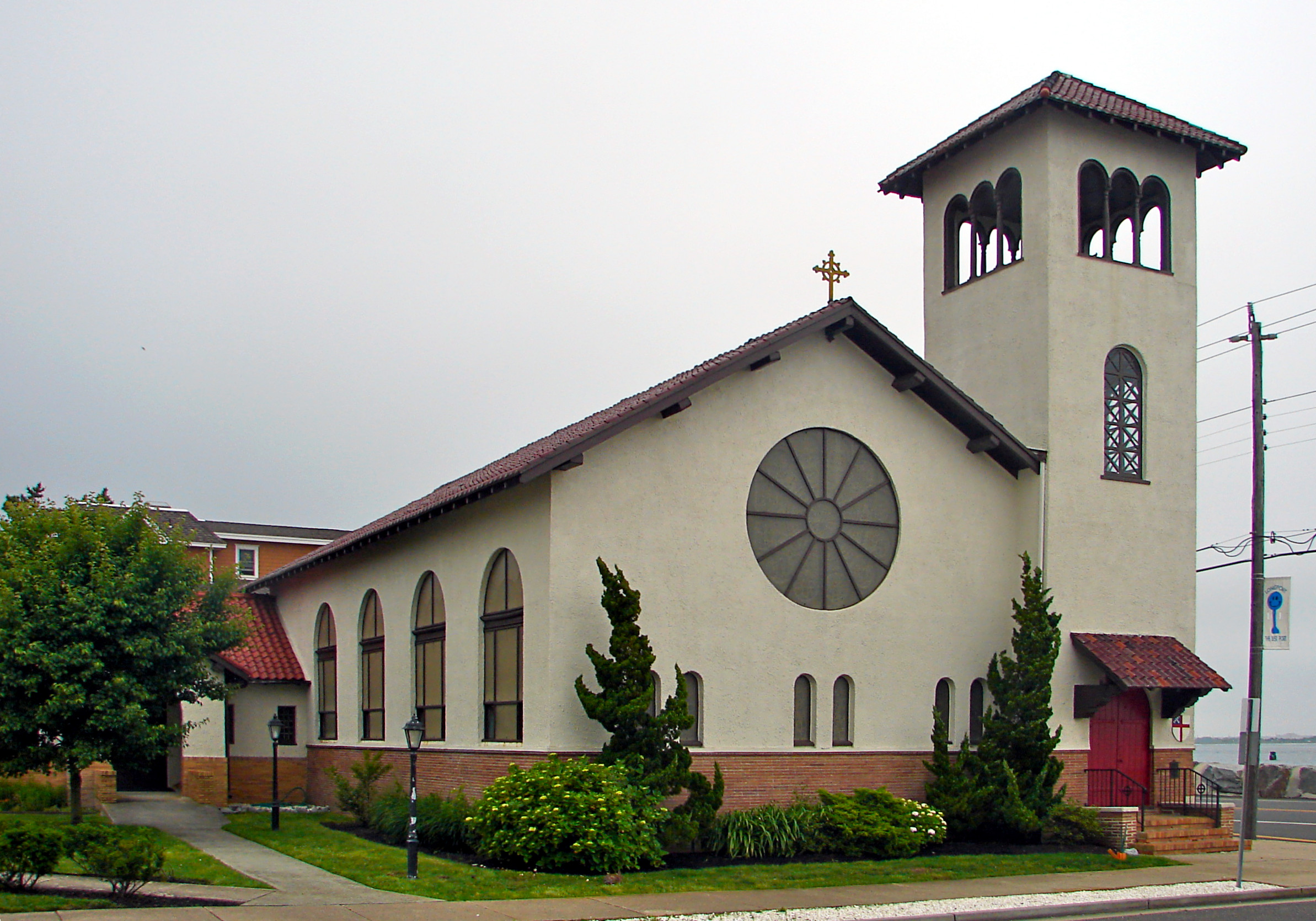
- In June 2011

- Location within Atlantic County, New Jersey Location within New Jersey Location within the United States
- Location: 20th and Atlantic Avenues; Longport, New Jersey
- Coordinates: 39°18′34″N 74°31′51″W
- Built: 1908
- Built by: W. S. Higbee, builder
- Architect: Duhring, Okie & Ziegler
- Architectural style: Mission/Spanish Revival, Spanish Colonial Revival
- NRHP reference No.: 92001179
- NJRHP No.: 382

Significant dates
- Added to NRHP: September 10, 1992
- Designated NJRHP: July 27, 1992

Church of the Redeemer, built in 1908, was a historic church located at 20th and Atlantic Avenues in the borough of Longport in Atlantic County, New Jersey, United States. The building was added to the National Register of Historic Places on September 10, 1992, for its significance in art. health/medicine and religion. It suffered a catastrophic fire in June 2012, and was demolished. A re-creation of the church is under construction and scheduled to open in June 2014.

== History and description ==
Designed by the firm of Duhring, Okie & Ziegler, the building likely was the work of architect H. Louis Duhring Jr. Duhring's father was a prominent Episcopal minister in Philadelphia, Pennsylvania, and a friend of Joseph P. Remington, the donor of the land for the church.

It was heavily damaged in a fire on June 30, 2012. The fire was thought to be started when the church was struck by lightning from a storm connected with the June 2012 North American derecho severe-weather event. The surviving structure was deemed unsafe and demolished on July 2, 2012.

== See also ==
- National Register of Historic Places listings in Atlantic County, New Jersey
