= Cable House and Station =

- U.S. National Register of Historic Places
- Alaska Heritage Resources Survey
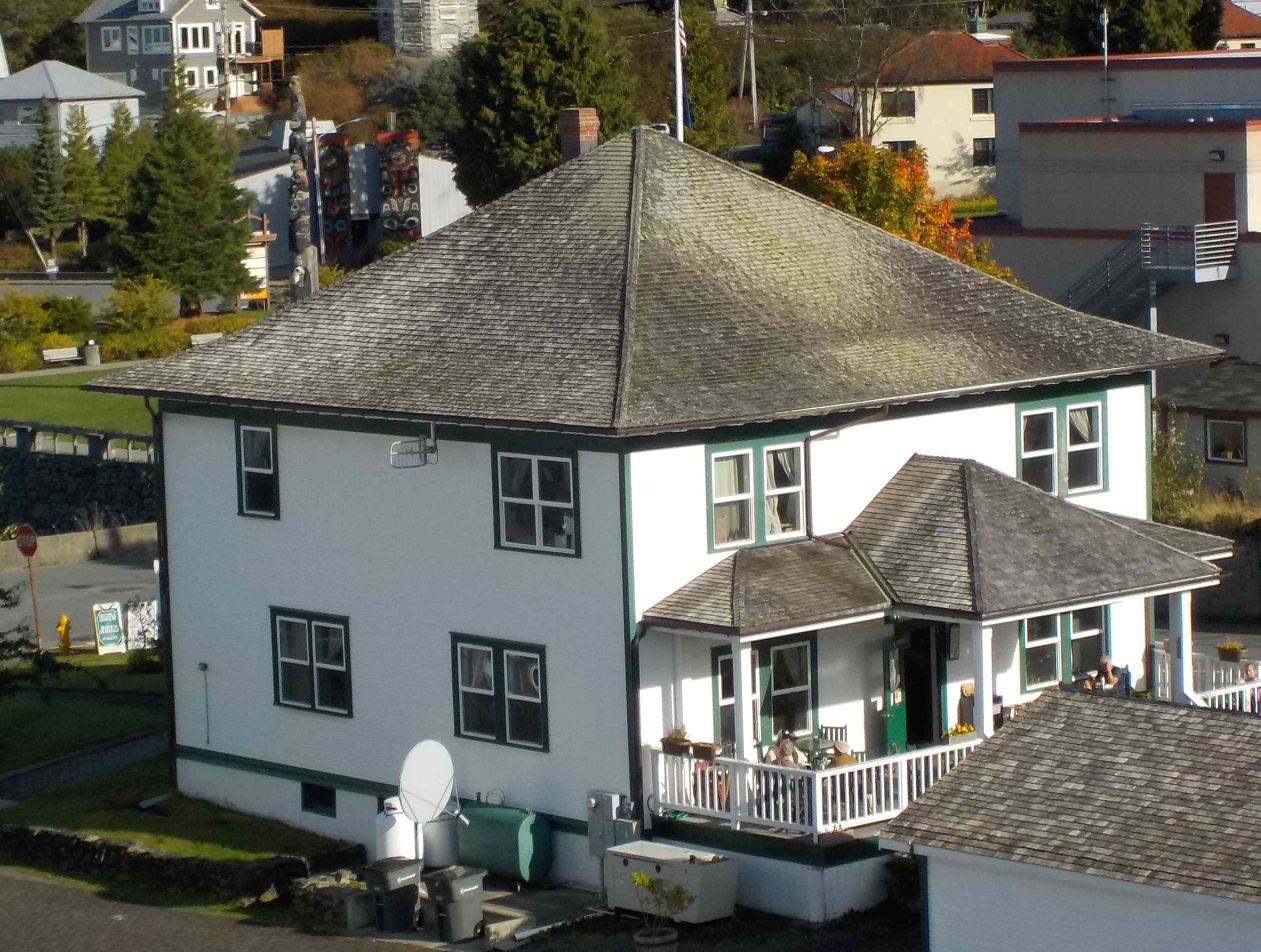

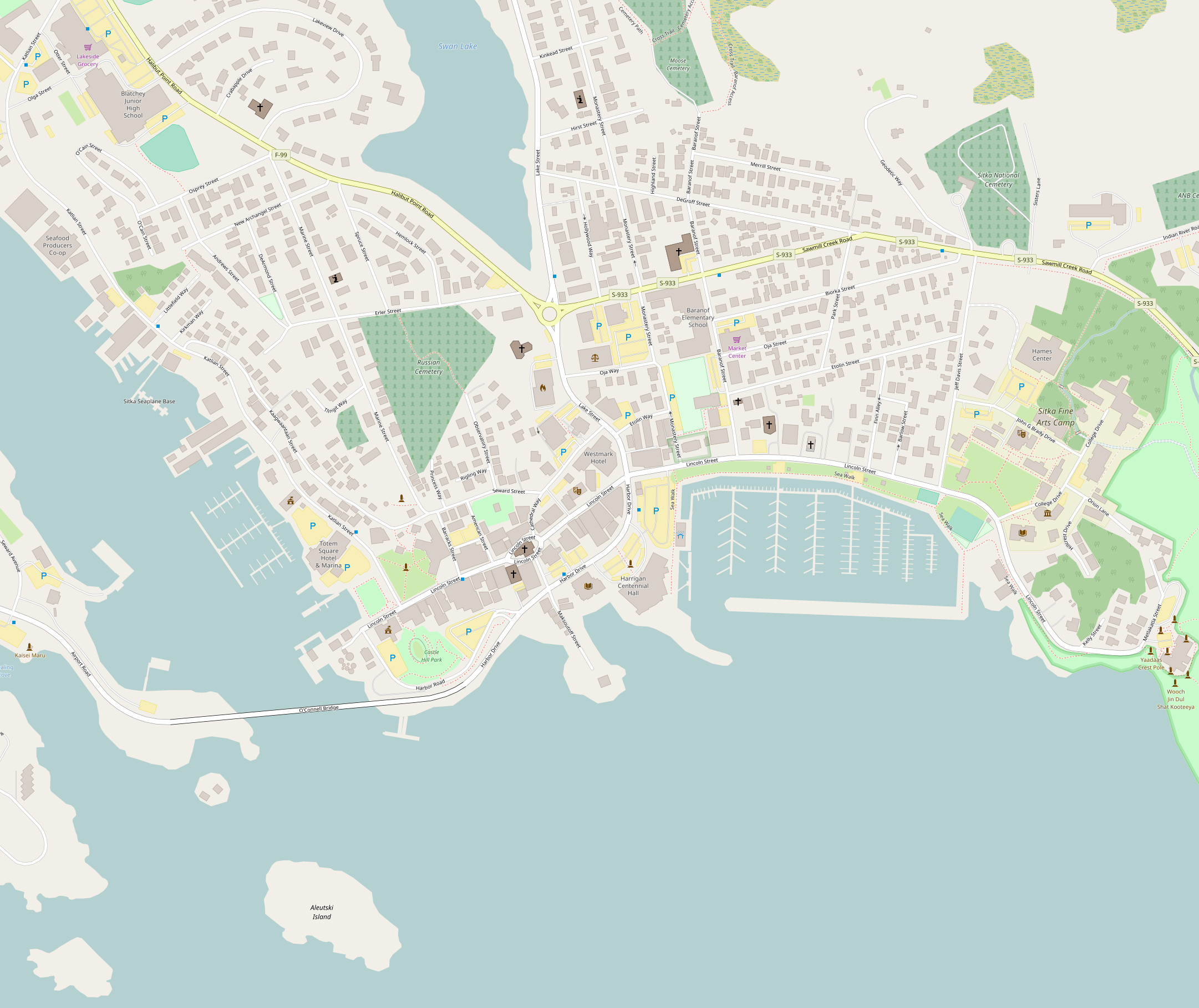
- Location within Downtown Sitka Location within Alaska
- Location: 2 Lincoln Street; Sitka, Alaska
- Coordinates: 57°02′55″N 135°20′21″W
- Area: 1.76 acres (0.71 ha)
- NRHP reference No.: 79000412
- AHRS No.: SIT-212

Significant dates
- Added to NRHP: June 4, 1979
- Designated AHRS: October 12, 1977

The Cable House and Station, also known as the Communications Center and Quarters, is a historic telecommunications building on Lincoln Street at Harbor Road in Sitka, Alaska. It is a modest two-story building, about 40 feet (12 m) square, with a hip roof. The building housed the telecommunications hub of the Washington-Alaska Military Cable and Telegraph System (WAMCATS), a military communications network established in the first decade of the 20th century, during the period of the Alaska boundary dispute with neighboring Canada.

The building was listed on the National Register of Historic Places in 1979.

== See also ==
- National Register of Historic Places listings in Sitka City and Borough, Alaska
