= See House =

Historic house in Alaska, United States

- U.S. National Register of Historic Places
- Alaska Heritage Resources Survey
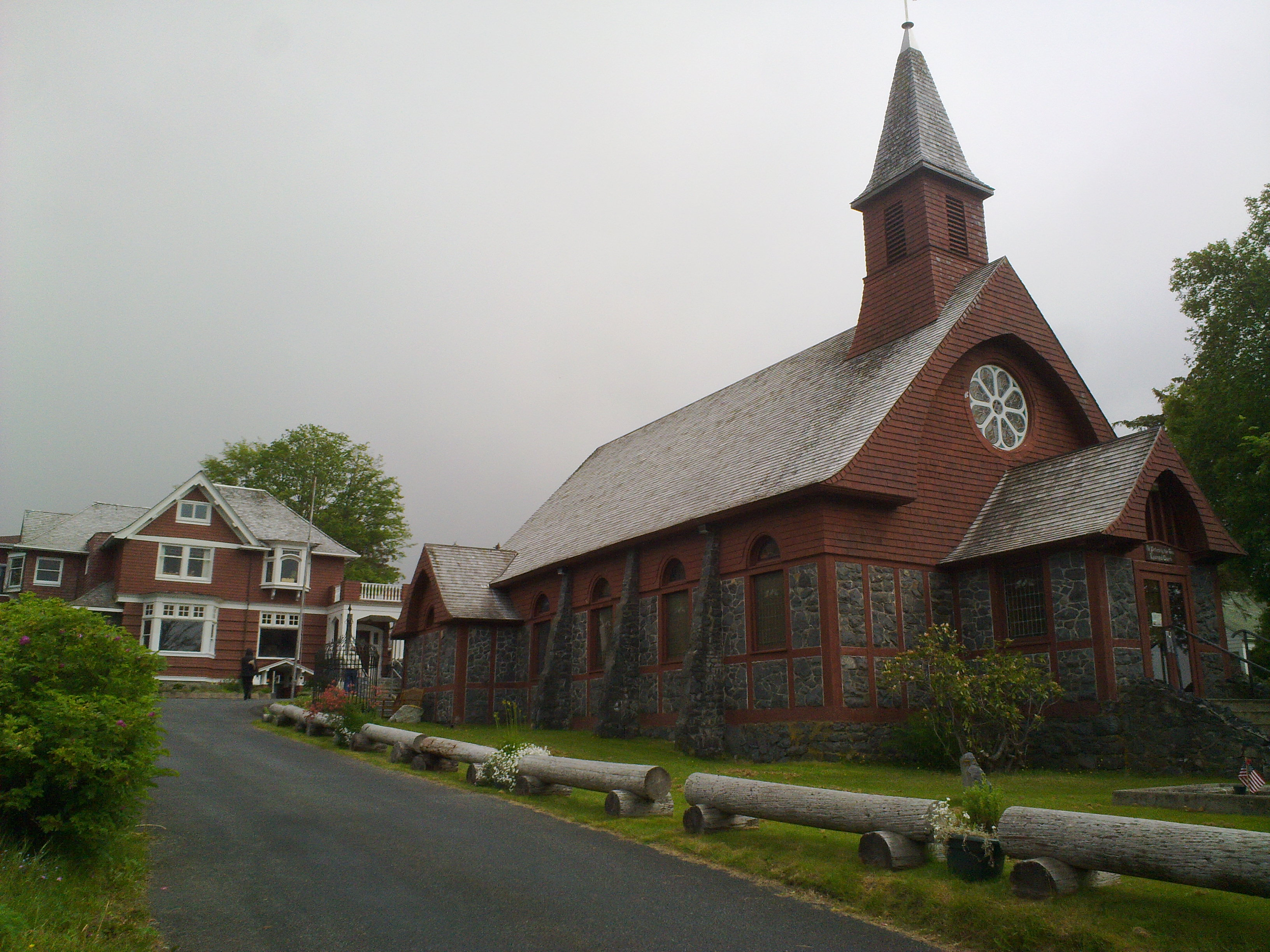
- Church (right) and See House (left)

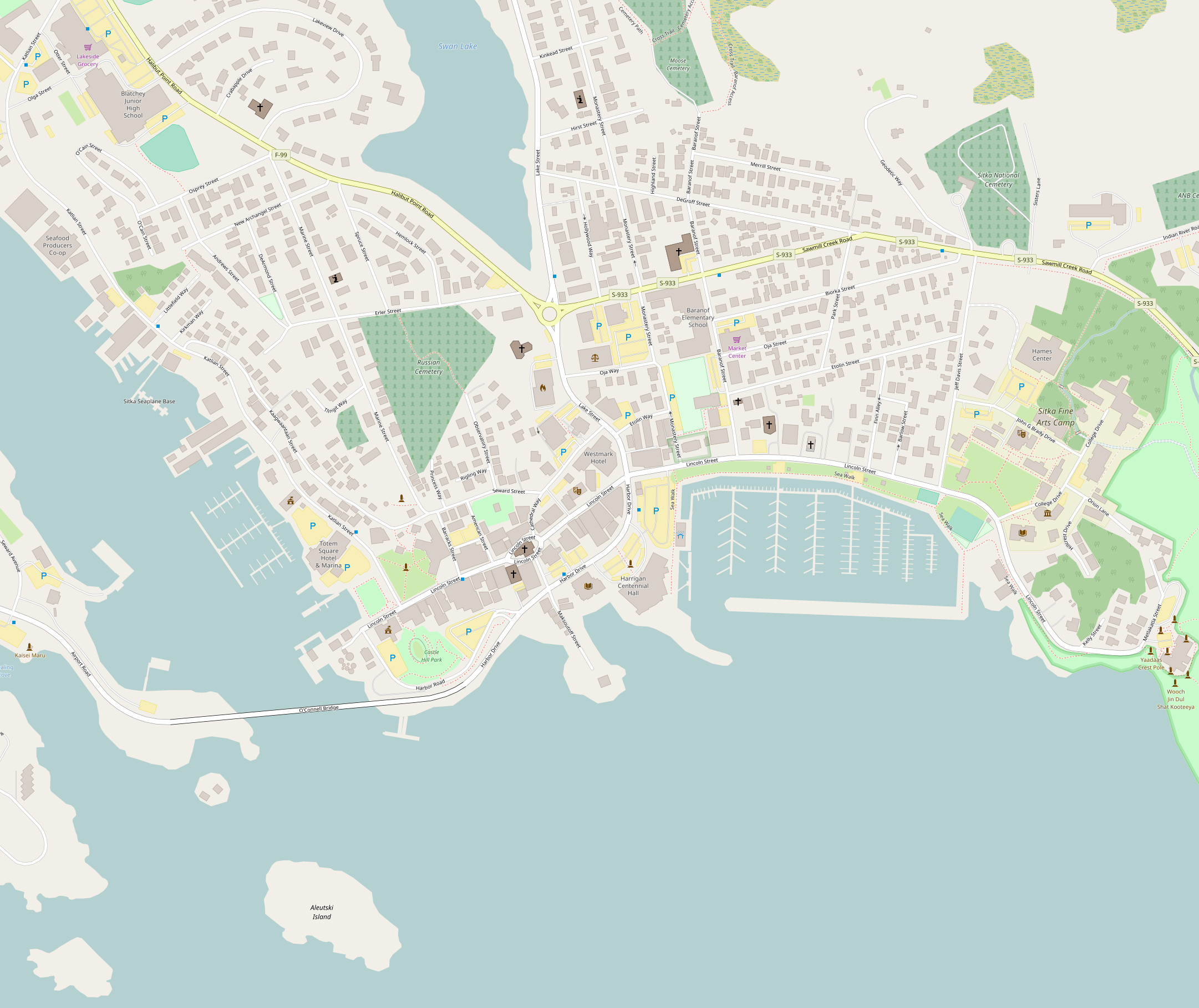
- Location within Downtown Sitka Location within Alaska
- Location: 611 Lincoln Street, behind St. Peter's Church, Sitka, Alaska
- Coordinates: 57°03′07″N 135°19′41″W
- Area: less than one acre
- Built: 1905
- Built by: Bishop Peter Trimble Rowe
- Architect: Bishop Peter Trimble Rowe; H.L. Duhring, Jr.
- NRHP reference No.: 78000537
- AHRS No.: SIT-195

Significant dates
- Added to NRHP: March 30, 1978
- Designated AHRS: March 7, 1977

The See House is the rectory of St. Peter's Church, at 611 Lincoln Street in Sitka, Alaska. It is a two-story wood-frame structure, designed by H. L. Duhring, Jr. of Philadelphia, Pennsylvania, and built in 1905 for Peter Trimble Rowe, the first Episcopal bishop of Alaska. The design was completed in 1899, when the church was built, but a lack of funding prevented its immediate construction. The house is, like the church, a fine local example of Gothic Revival architecture.

The house was listed on the National Register of Historic Places in 1978.

== See also ==
- National Register of Historic Places listings in Sitka City and Borough, Alaska
