= Manley & Mayer =

American architectural firm

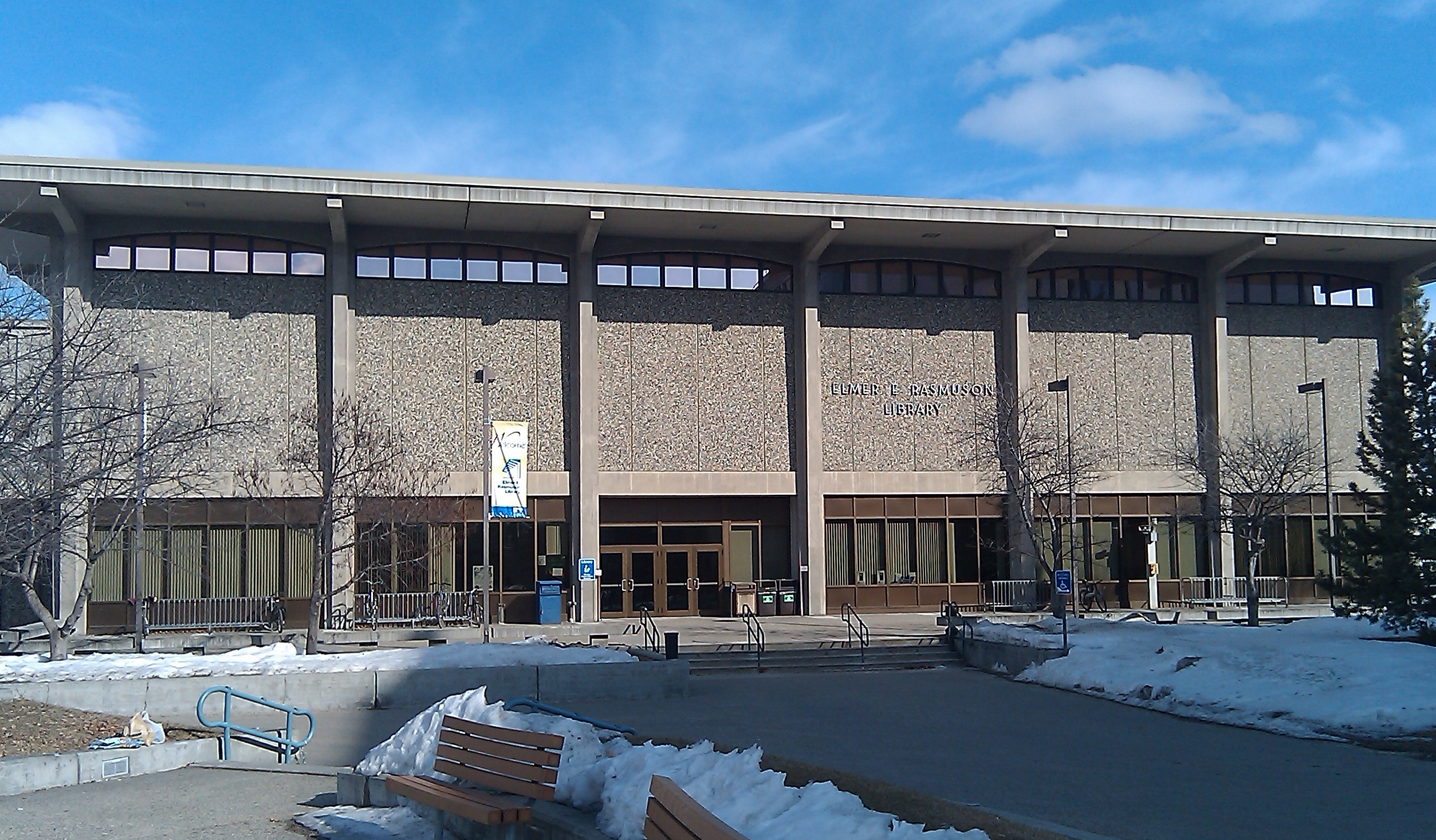
Rasmuson Library, Fairbanks, 1967.

Manley & Mayer was an American architectural firm in Alaska, and was the leading firm in Anchorage for several decades.

== History ==
The firm was established in 1941 by William A. Manley, who had been the Anchorage representative of N. L. Troast & Associates, of Juneau. Manley had been Troast's head draftsman from 1930, had been made a partner by 1935, and came to Anchorage in late 1937. In 1948, Manley added a partner, Francis B. Mayer, a native of Spokane, Washington. Mayer had been with Manley since 1947. Manley & Mayer became the leading firm in Anchorage, and designed many public buildings and schools there and in the surrounding region. Manley and Mayer remained associated until 1970.

== The partners ==
William A. Manley was born in Washington state in 1904. He was raised in Juneau, where his family had moved in 1913. He studied architecture at the University of Idaho at Moscow, later returning to Juneau. When architect N. Lester Troast moved his office to Juneau from Sitka, Manley was hired as a draftsman. In 1935 he was promoted to partner, the firm becoming N. Lester Troast & Associates. When pioneer Anchorange architect E. Ellsworth Sedille left the state, Troast & Associates opened an office there, with Manley in charge. Troast and Manley separated in 1941, when Troast moved to New Jersey.

Manley established the firm of Manley & Mayer in 1948, with Francis B. Mayer. He retired in 1967, but the partnership remained active until 1970. He died in 1979.

Francis Bernardo Mayer was born in Spokane, Washington in 1914. He joined Manley in 1947, becoming a partner in 1948. He died in 1985.

== Legacy ==
A number of their Anchorage buildings were demolished during the construction boom of the 1980s, which displaced large portions of the city. However, many, especially outside of Anchorage, still have prominent places in their communities.

== Selected works ==
=== William A. Manley, 1941-1948 ===
- 1946 - Central Building, 308 G St, Anchorage, Alaska
- 1947 - Loussac-Sogn Building, 425 D St, Anchorage, Alaska, listed on the National Register of Historic Places in 1998 as a rare example of Art Moderne in Anchorage
- 1948 - Fairbanks Main School (Addition), 800 Cushman S., Fairbanks, Alaska

=== Manley & Mayer, 1948-1972 ===
- 1949 - Turnagain Arms, 525 W 3rd Ave, Anchorage, Alaska
- 1950 - Denali School (former), Lathrop St, Fairbanks, Alaska
  - Demolished in 2005.
- 1951 - Government Hill Fire Station (former), 921 Hollywood Dr, Anchorage, Alaska
- 1952 - Sand Point School, Red Cove Rd, Sand Point, Alaska
- 1953 - Sidney Laurence Municipal Auditorium, 621 W 6th Ave, Anchorage, Alaska
  - Demolished in 1985.
- 1953 - Z. J. Loussac Public Library (former), 555 W 5th Ave, Anchorage, Alaska
  - Demolished in 1981.
- 1954 - Anchorage High School, Hillcrest Dr, Anchorage, Alaska
- 1954 - Woodland Park Elementary School (former), W 36th Ave, Anchorage, Alaska
  - Presently occupied as the headquarters of the Boys and Girls Clubs - Alaska.
- 1956 - Homer High School, E Fairview Ave, Homer, Alaska
- 1956 - Valdez High School, Empire & Sherman Sts, Valdez, Alaska
  - Destroyed in the 1964 earthquake.
- 1958 - Bunnell Building, University of Alaska, Fairbanks, Alaska
- 1958 - Grant Hall, Alaska Pacific University, Anchorage, Alaska
- 1960 - East Anchorage High School, E Northern Lights Blvd, Anchorage, Alaska
- 1962 - Commerce Building, 441 W 5th Ave, Anchorage, Alaska
- 1964 - Atwood Center, Alaska Pacific University, Anchorage, Alaska
  - Manley & Mayer served as the local representative of architect Edward Durell Stone, the primary designer.
- 1965 - A. J. Dimond High School (Old), W 88th Ave, Anchorage, Alaska
  - Demolished in 2005.
- 1965 - Seward City Hall, 410 Adams St, Seward, Alaska
- 1967 - Elmer E. Rasmuson Library, University of Alaska, Fairbanks, Alaska
- 1968 - North Terminal, Anchorage International Airport, Anchorage, Alaska
- 1968 - Simpson Building, 645 G St, Anchorage, Alaska
- 1969 - Mackay Building Annex, 323 E 4th Ave, Anchorage, Alaska. McKinley Tower Apartments, in which Manley & Mayer designed post-earthquake renovations, was listed on the National Register of Historic Places in 2008.

== Gallery ==
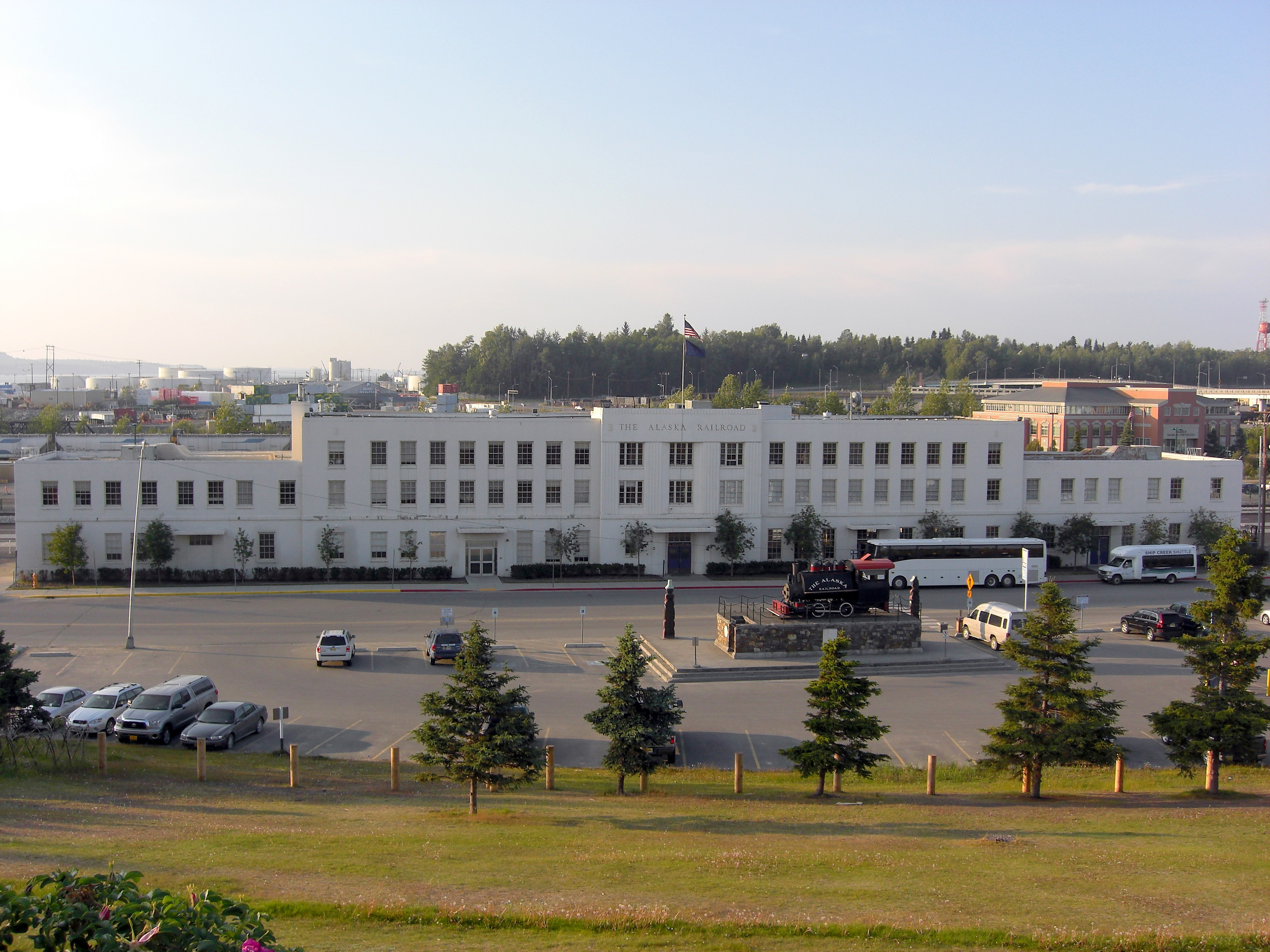
Alaska Railroad Depot, Anchorage, 1942.

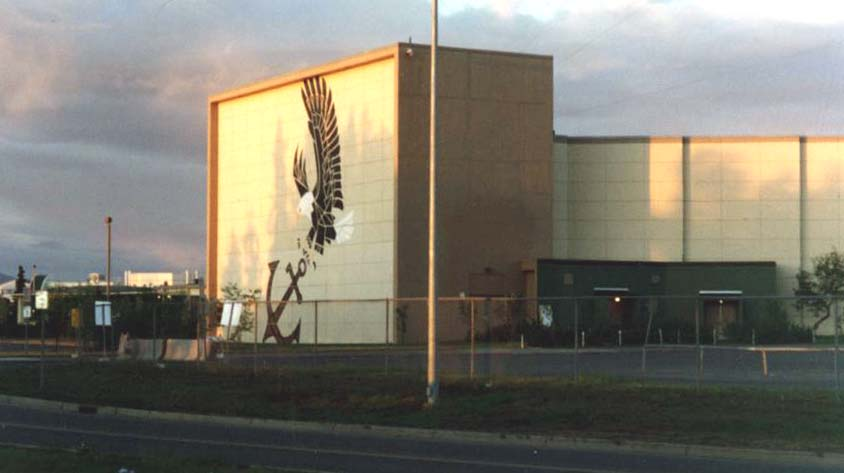
High School, Anchorage, 1954.

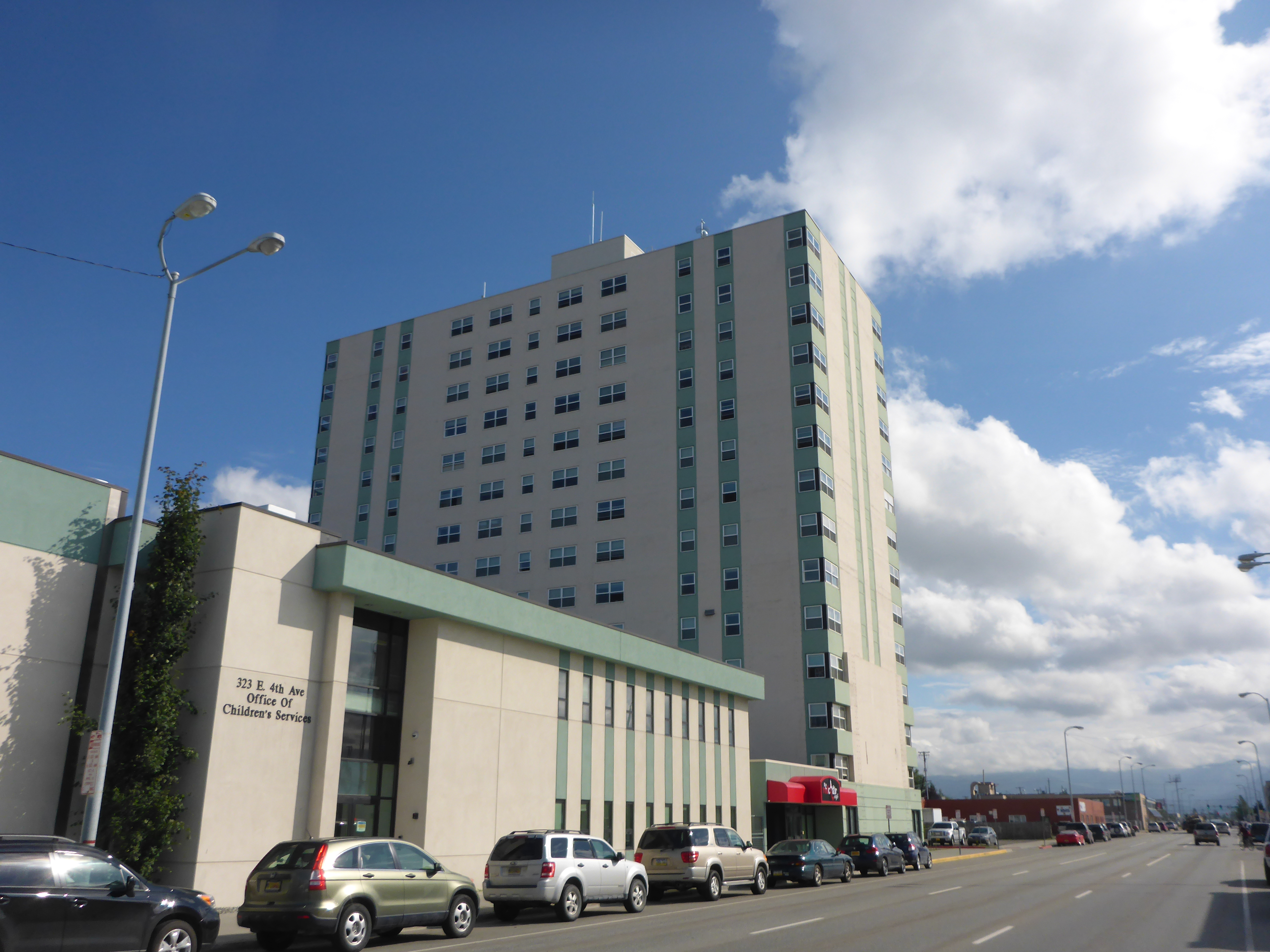
MacKay Building Annex, Anchorage, 1969.
