= Troast =

Troast is a surname. Notable people with the surname include:

- Chloe Troast (born 1997), American comedian and actress
- N. Lester Troast (1899–1958), American architect
- Paul L. Troast (1894–1972), American building contractor
