= Elmer E. Rasmuson Library =

Coordinates: 64°51′24″N 147°49′12″W

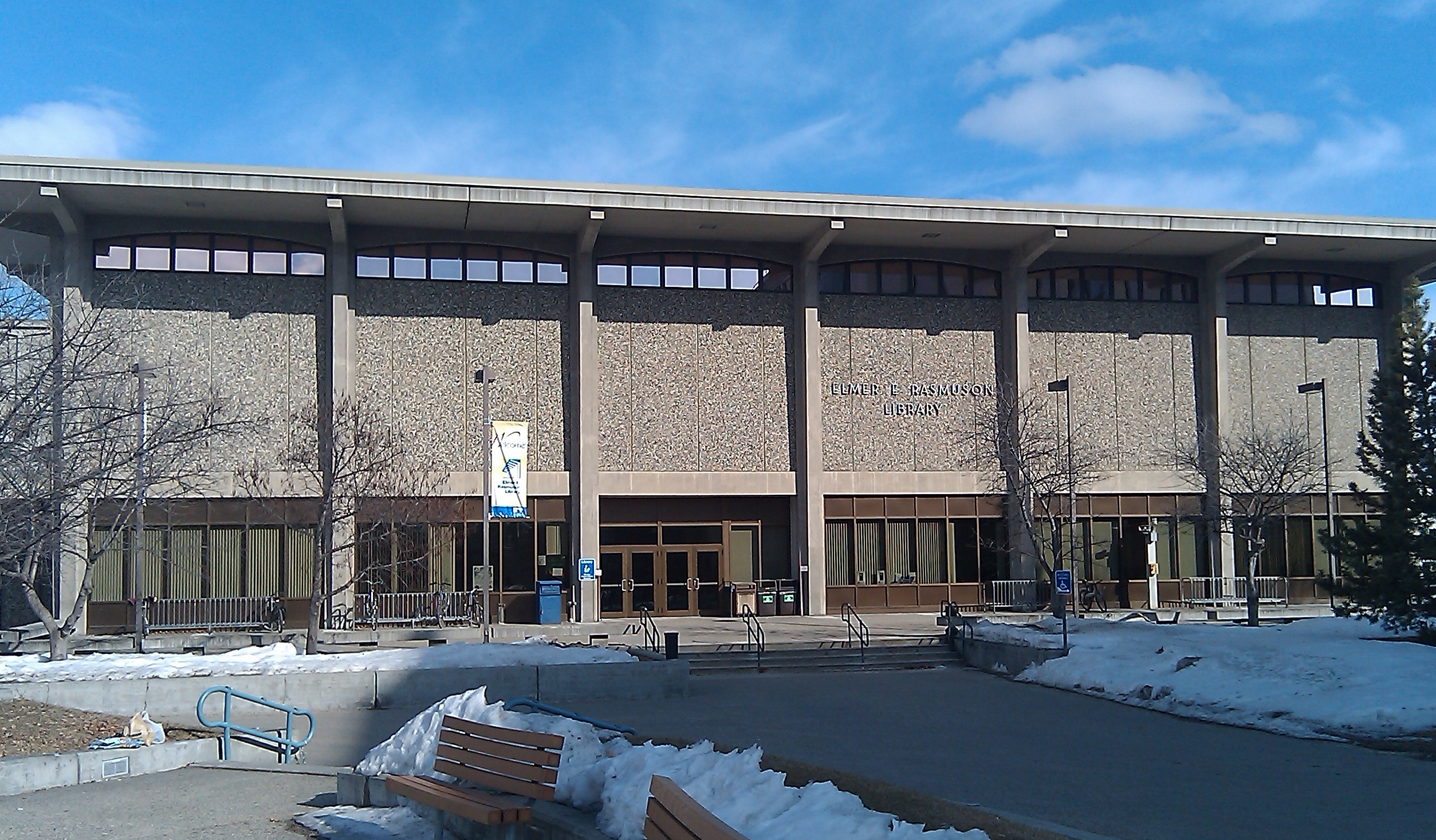
West elevation of the library building.

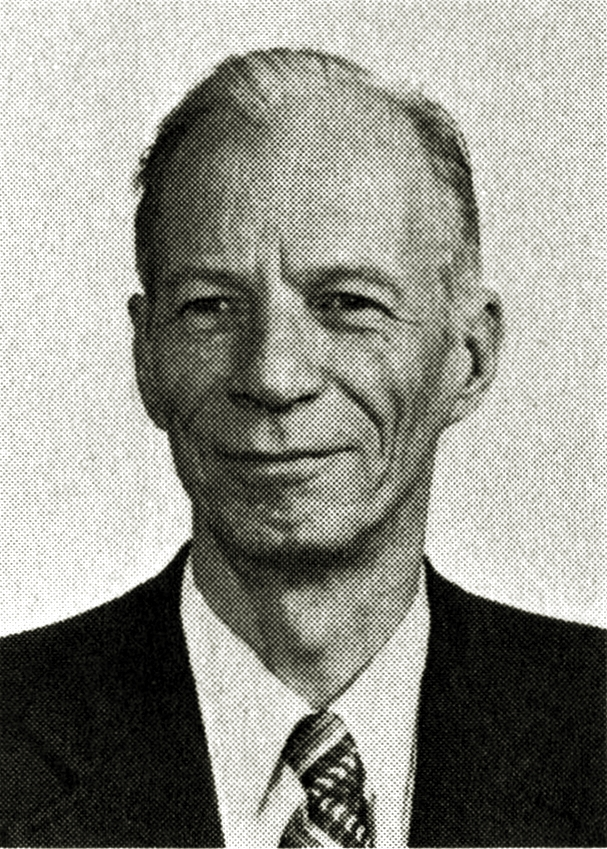
Charlie Parr (1918–2000) was the library's first Arctic bibliographer and later a member of the state house and state senate.

The Elmer E. Rasmuson Library (often referred to as Rasmuson Library) is the largest research library in the U.S. state of Alaska, housing just over one million volumes. Located on the University of Alaska Fairbanks campus, it is named in honor of Elmer E. Rasmuson, who served on the University of Alaska Board of Regents from 1950 to 1969 and was the board chair from 1956 to 1968. He was a major supporter of expanding the library and moving it to its present location.

The library houses the Alaska and Polar Regions Collections and Archives special collection. This encompasses historical books and periodicals, historical manuscripts and photographs, an oral history collection, rare books and maps, and the Alaska Film Archives. It hosts Project Jukebox, which presents oral history recordings, film clips, photos and documents on various themes,. The Alaska Film Archives is a major collection of historical film and video from and about Alaska and the polar regions. It hosts a YouTube channel and provides digital clips to patrons and the public. A special collection of Alaskana books is one of the largest in the world. Since the closing of the Sheldon Jackson College Stratton Library in 2007, the Rasmuson Library and the Alaska State Library in Juneau are the foremost publicly accessible repositories of historical information related to Alaska.

The library is a Federal Depository Library, housing federal government documents for the state of Alaska.

Rasmuson Library offers extensive online resources for UAF students, faculty, staff and others affiliated with the university. It is a gateway to more than 300 online resources, with broad coverage in the sciences, humanities and social sciences, management, and engineering. Web-based indexes and collections link to full-text articles from more than 60,000 periodical titles. Additional web-based resources include reference tools, electronic books, specialized sources for Arctic and polar information, and indexes to special formats such as government documents and dissertations. ScholarWorks@UA, the University of Alaska online institutional repository, makes theses, dissertations, articles and other scholarly works by University of Alaska students and faculty available to the public.

== History ==
The library was founded in 1922 with fewer than three thousand books, the same year classes began at UAF's predecessor, the Alaska Agricultural College and School of Mines. After moving from Old Main Building, the library was housed in a small building which doubled as the university's gymnasium and where the Constitution of Alaska was signed in 1956. The library moved to the Bunnell Building upon its completion in 1960, then to its present location in the Fine Arts Complex a decade later. Both buildings were designed by Anchorage architects Manley & Mayer. The library underwent a major expansion in 1984.
