= Alaska Cooperative Extension Service =

Agricultural extension service operated by the University of Alaska Fairbanks

University of Alaska Fairbanks Cooperative Extension Service is an outreach-based educational delivery system supported by a partnership between the United States Department of Agriculture (USDA) and the University of Alaska Fairbanks (UAF). The UAF Cooperative Extension Service annually serves approximately 80,000 Alaskans, “providing a link between Alaska's diverse people and communities by interpreting and extending relevant university, research-based knowledge in an understandable and usable form to the public.” Since 1930 the UAF Extension Service has partnered with many organizations across the state of Alaska in pursuit of fulfilling its land-grant university mission to disseminate agricultural research and other scientific information.

== Organization ==
UAF Cooperative Extension Service is part of the larger Cooperative Extension Service in the United States. At UAF, Extension is organized by program area. A UAF faculty member serves as the program chair in each of the four areas: agriculture and horticulture; health, home and family development; natural resources and community development; and 4-H and youth development. The program chairs report to the director of the organization. The director also serves as vice provost of outreach for the university. In addition to the four program areas, Extension has its own business office and communications unit within the university. Each of the program chairs oversees faculty and staff across the various districts in the state. District office locations include Anchorage, Bethel, Delta Junction, Fairbanks, Juneau, Nome, Palmer, Sitka and Soldotna, and affiliate offices are located at the Tanana Chiefs Conference, Eielson Air Force Base, Kodiak and Thorne Bay.

== Purpose ==
UAF Cooperative Extension Service brings research-based information to the public in an understandable and useful form. Its strategic plan identifies food safety and security, health, climate change, energy, economic development, and youth, family and communities as major themes. The faculty and staff of the Extension offices offer research-based expertise to the public on a wide variety of topics to a wide variety of audiences, from farmers and entrepreneurs to rural families and children. In Alaska, experts in agriculture and horticulture, integrated pest management, youth development, foods and nutrition, natural resources, community development, energy and more are employed by Extension. In order to make research-based information accessible to the public, UAF Extension offers many publications, from one-page fact sheets to the 482-page Master Gardener manual.

Experts with UAF Extension offer workshops and practical trainings to citizens in communities around Alaska. Regular topics include pesticide applicator certifications, Master Gardener and other gardening courses, and youth camps. Agents have worked on projects that affect Alaska statewide.

Fishing and hunting are popular in the state, and residents are often looking for information on how to preserve fish and game meat. UAF Extension has produced publications on topics especially of interest to Alaskans such as canning moose and caribou meat, canning walrus meat, preserving fireweed and harvesting and preparing Nereocystis luetkeana or bullwhip kelp from Alaska's coastal areas. UAF Extension agents also offer pressure canner gauge testing to help Alaskans ensure they are preserving foods safely.

== History ==
The United States purchased Alaska from Russia in 1867. Several events before and after the Alaska Purchase laid the groundwork for Extension's beginnings in the new U.S. territory. Firstly, the Morrill Act of 1862, signed by President Lincoln, granted federal lands to each state. The proceeds from the land were to be used to fund public colleges focused on engineering and agriculture. James Wickersham, judge and congressional delegate in the early 1900s, became aware of the Morrill Act and pushed for the creation of a college in the interior, submitting an education bill to Congress. The cornerstone for Alaska's land-grant college, Alaska Agricultural College and School of Mines, was presented in 1915. The college started classes in 1922. However, Alaska did not receive the full benefits of the Morrill Act. Though Alaska was entitled to about 360,000 acres (145,687 ha) of land from legislation passed in 1915, the implementation of the 1958 Alaska Statehood Act repealed the gift before 97 percent of the land could be surveyed and granted. During statehood negotiations, Congress felt that federal lands given to the state were sufficient to also provide for the university, and Alaska politicians felt that it would have more freedom in land choice by avoiding university-specific grants. Luckily, before statehood, a grant of land in 1929 that is still in effect today provided tens of thousands of acres dedicated to university use.

In addition to the land-grant process, the advent of agricultural research in Alaska contributed significantly to the development of Extension services. Starting at the turn of the century and continuing through 1915, seven federal agriculture experiment stations were established in Alaska. The agriculturalists from the experiment stations established the viability of farm and garden programs in Alaska. Their work was augmented by the addition of Extension agents with funding stemming from the Smith-Lever Act of 1914, fully extended to Alaska in 1929. The Alaska legislature designated the Alaska Agricultural College and School of Mines, which eventually became the University of Alaska, as administrator of the Cooperative Extension Service work that would be provided by experts in agriculture and home economics. Charles E. Bunnell, college president at the time, worked with USDA to organize the fledgling service in June 1930. Lydia Fohn-Hansen was made assistant director for home economics, and George W. Gasser became assistant director for agriculture. Starting in July 1930, the new appointees began working with Alaskans. They helped organize nine 4-H clubs and 12 home economics clubs. Travel was completed by whatever means necessary, which sometimes meant dogsled. Fohn-Hansen was on the road for months at a time as she "toured the state carrying teaching supplies, clothing, bulletins, pressure canner, can sealer, patterns, garden seeds, needles, yarn and probably a loom..."

In 1932 a veterinarian was added to the staff. In 1935, a full-time director was appointed for Extension, the same year that the federal government established the Matanuska Colony. The Matanuska Colony refers to 200 families selected from Michigan, Wisconsin and Minnesota to settle and farm the Matanuska Valley, building the local economy in Southcentral Alaska. The first Cooperative Extension Service field office in Alaska was established in 1936 in Palmer, located in the Matanuska Valley. Extension's agricultural and home demonstration agents placed there worked closely with colonists and homesteaders to establish viable farming practices in the valley. Lydia Fohn-Hansen was a key figure during this growth period. She worked out of a tent in the valley providing educational services to the colonists. In addition to teaching people how to can salmon and other Alaska resources, Fohn-Hansen was an accomplished weaver and helped women make gloves and other clothes. She was well educated, with a master's in home economics from Iowa State College, and she wrote hundreds of bulletins and circulars during her time with Extension.

The Alaska Agricultural College and School of Mines became the University of Alaska in 1935, and in 1937 a new joint director of experiment farms and Extension Service was appointed. With efforts centralized and appropriations to the territory increased, Extension expanded its size and reach over the next decade to include field offices in Juneau, Anchorage and Fairbanks. As World War II engulfed the nation, Extension home economists helped Alaskans learn to can food and cultivate vegetables. Over 1,300 Victory gardens were planted in Alaska. The national 4-H slogan during the war was "Food for Freedom." Extension's expansion efforts eventually coincided with military interests as the war brought an inquiry into the use of Alaska sites for defense against Russia. Military officials recognized that infrastructure was needed to address the fact that Alaska would be cut off from food deliveries if under attack; Alaska needed to be able to produce some of its own supplies. Thus, in 1947 as part of the Department of Agriculture Appropriation Act, $20,000 was made available for the study of agricultural development in the territory. However, the legislation also put the USDA back in control of agricultural research programs in Alaska, and the joint director position of the prior decade was dissolved. The experiment stations were put back under federal control, and Extension was directed separately.

In the 1950s, Extension in Alaska focused on bringing educational resources to more remote areas of the northern and western parts of the state. During this decade, Extension collaborated with community members to determine the needs of the growing territory. In a 1956 report to the Secretary of the Interior, Governor Mike Stepovich noted that Extension was "guided by local producer and consumer committees where representatives of rural and urban groups have an opportunity to make their needs known." The consulted groups included homemaker councils, soil conservation workers, members of The National Grange of the Order of Patrons of Husbandry, dairy breeders and others. Also at this time, the former Alaska Rural Development Board provided funds to Extension to do community building in Alaska villages. More than $10,000 in territorial funds was appropriated to provide an "agent-at-large" who could reach out to remote villages and teach gardening skills. The initiative was a success in the Upper Yukon, with each viable garden generating an estimated $1,000 to $1,500 worth of produce to supplement the local diet. Money was then set aside to send an additional agent to travel to the Lower Yukon and Kuskokwim areas of the territory. In 1957, a full-time 4-H leader was hired and 113 clubs reported a total enrollment of 1,182 youth. Enrollment in 1958 had risen to 1,506 youth with the addition of 28 clubs. Alaska officially became the 49th state of the United States in 1959, the same year that Fohn-Hansen was presented with an honorary humanities doctorate from UAF for her many years of dedicated service.

In 1975, a 4-H market livestock auction was established in southern Alaska. It began with community members from the Kenai Peninsula, Kodiak and Palmer coming together to plan a show for the sale of seven Hereford steers from Kodiak and Kenai Peninsula. Though there were some delays due to an auctioneer cancellation and a need for more bidders, the auction was a success. The Grand Champion animal, a steer from Homer, went for 95 cents a pound. The first project animal from Palmer was auctioned in 1978, and by 1980 there were 18 animals from the Mat-Su Valley entered in the program. In 1983, youth from the Delta area began participating. 1988 brought the "parade of champions" in which the top two beef, hogs, lambs, veal and goats from Kenai, Delta and Palmer were in contention for state champion. The auction continues to be hosted today on the grounds of the Alaska State Fair and is one of several 4-H market livestock auctions during the fair season.

Extension invested in toll-free hotline numbers in the 1980s, offering one for food safety questions and one for energy and building questions. In the 1990s the first web page for UAF Cooperative Extension went online, providing even more exposure for its programs. Early versions not only featured a calendar of workshops and a directory, but extended to the public online access to many publications and newsletters. Images of UAF Extension's web pages from the late 1990s can be viewed using the digital archive services of the Wayback Machine.

== 21st century UAF extension ==
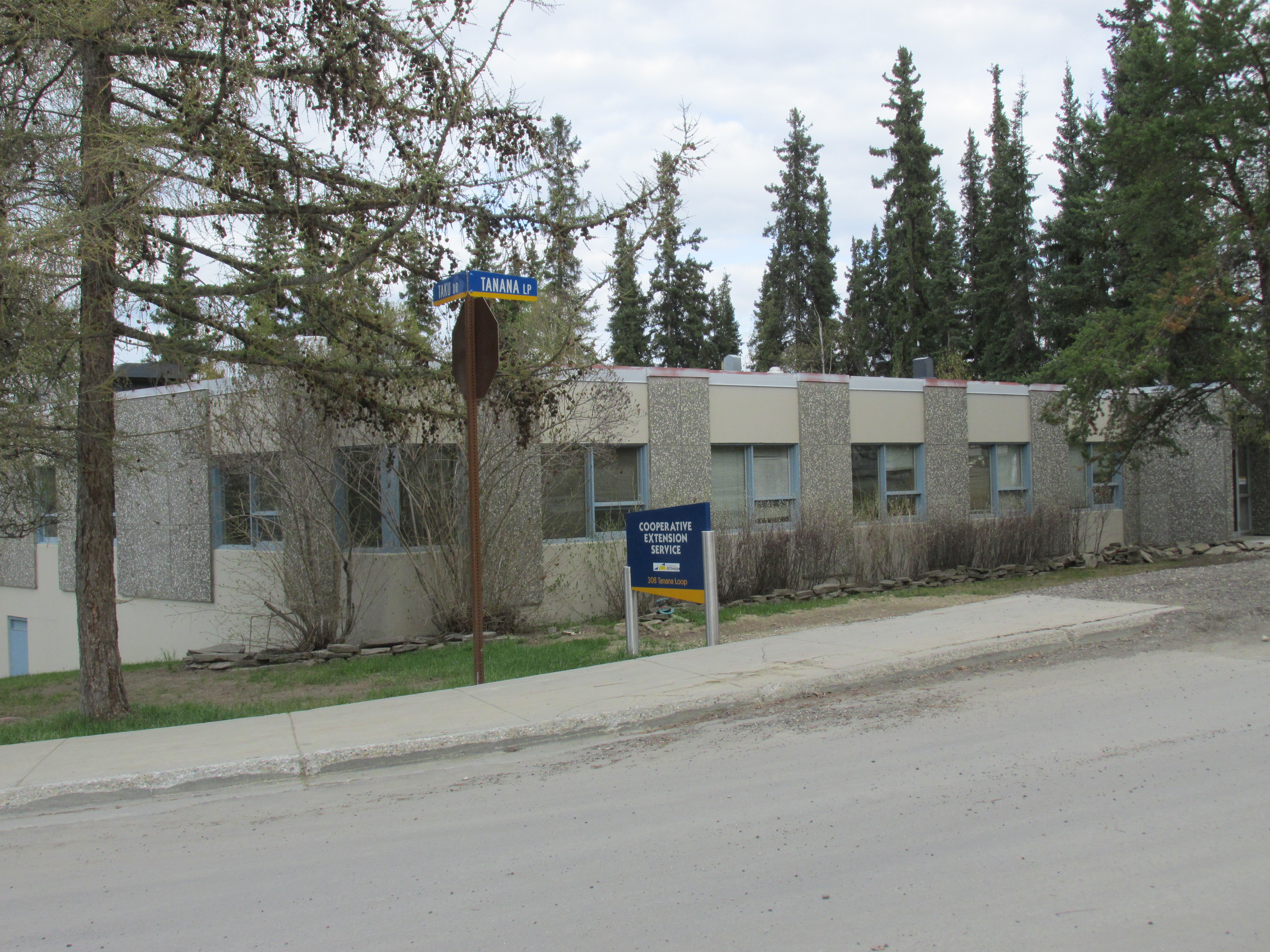

The University of Alaska currently maintains its land-grant endowment as a trust fund that collects various forms of income from its federal land grants. The UAF Cooperative Extension Service resides within the UAF Office of the Provost. UAF's public service and community engagement role is filled in part by Extension educators, faculty and staff located across the state of Alaska. The mission to bring research to the public is pursued in a collaborative fashion, with Extension working to connect Alaskans to the university as well as bringing the issues and challenges of the public to the university. Projects are often client-driven with Extension faculty responding to community needs. In particular, Alaska requires unique attention for its specific cultural, geographic and climatological differences from the rest of the United States. Alaska is known for its mineral deposits and shorelines, and renewable resources like fish and wood, as well as nonrenewable resources like petroleum. Alaska still imports the majority of the food consumed in the state. These are all issues that UAF Cooperative Extension works to examine and address. In a 2012 Plan of Work, UAF Extension describes its commitment to using nonformal education services to build Alaskan communities through programming in agriculture and horticulture, sustainability, natural resources, community development, youth development, global food security, food safety, childhood obesity, climate change, ecosystem management, and sustainable energy. UAF Extension also maintains its commitment to engagement by consulting with multiple advisory councils that include community members from a variety of backgrounds. Farmers, gardeners, miners, foresters, village leaders, parents, teachers and youth representatives meet regularly with Extension leadership to help inform decision making.

Some villages in Alaska are only accessible by plane or boat. Extension agents do make site visits to more remote locations like Kake and Angoon when possible. The Federally Recognized Tribes Extension Program (FRTEP) also provides opportunities for agriculture education specifically to Alaska Natives through a collaboration with the Tanana Chiefs Conference. Programs include the Alaskan Growers School which aims to teach participants how to grow food to provide for themselves and 10 other families or start an agricultural business.

The advent of new technologies has allowed Extension agents to interact with the public in ways that were not available. Alaska is the largest state in the nation in terms of square miles, so in order to provide educational services to clients in multiple locations at once, UAF Extension personnel in Alaska also make use of videoconferencing technology. The communications unit of UAF Extension also helps maintain several online communities through social media platforms, including Facebook pages and a YouTube channel.

== List of directors ==
- 1930-1933: Charles Bunnell
- 1933-1935: Ross L. Sheely
- 1935: Lorin T. Oldroyd
- 1951: Lynn O. Hollist
- 1952: Allan H. Mick
- 1961-1971: Arthur Buswell
- 1971-1987: James Matthews
- 1987-1992: Irvin Skelton (acting)
- 1992-1997: Hollis Hall
- 1997-1999: Anthony Nakazawa (interim)
- 1999-2007 Anthony Nakazawa
- 2007-2009: Pete Pinney (interim)
- 2009–2019: Fred Schlutt
- 2019–2021: Milan Shipka (acting)
- 2021-2023: Pete Pinney (interim)
- 2023-Present: Jodie Anderson
