= Loussac–Sogn Building =

- U.S. National Register of Historic Places
- Alaska Heritage Resources Survey
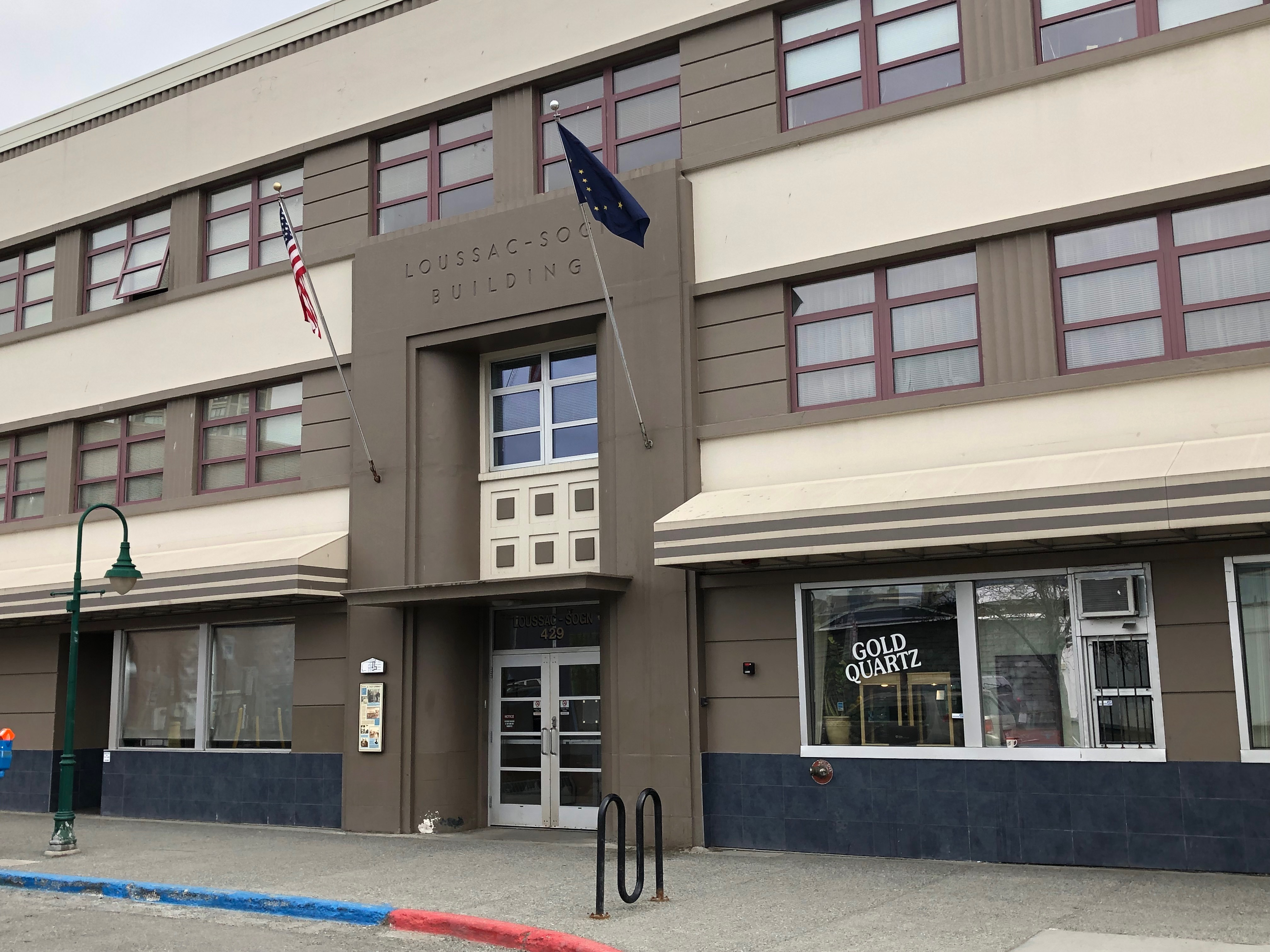

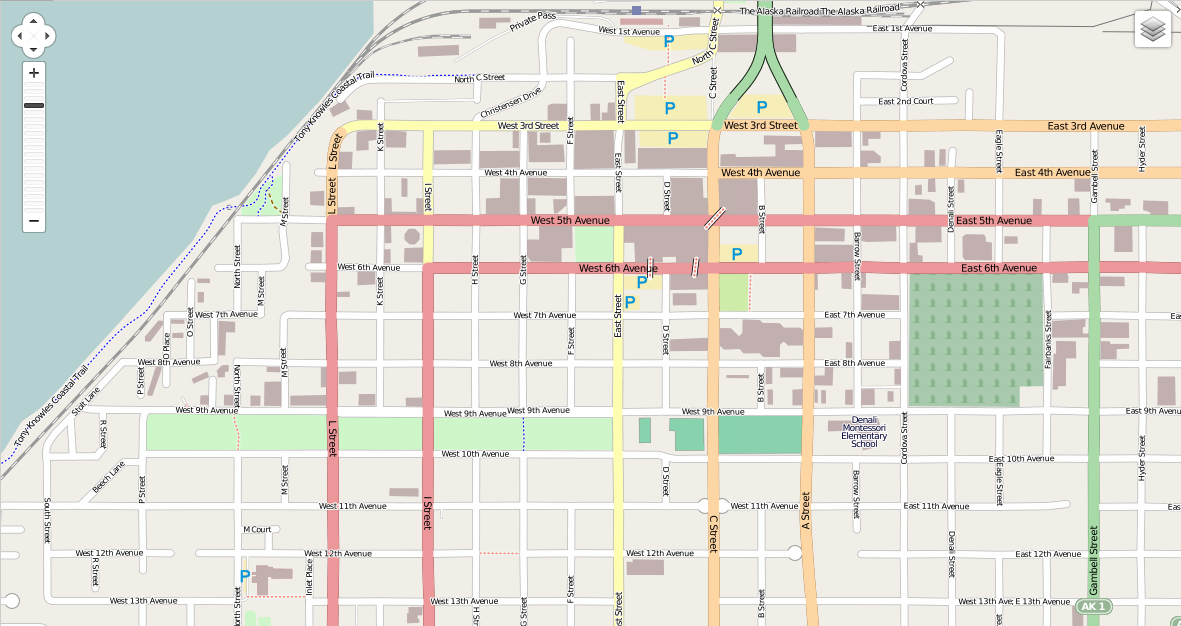
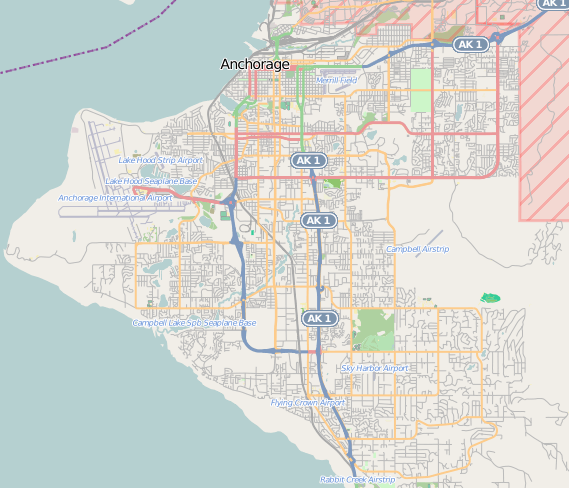
- Location within Downtown Anchorage Location within Anchorage Location within Alaska
- Location: 425 D Street, Anchorage, Alaska
- Coordinates: 61°13′4″N 149°53′20″W
- Area: less than one acre
- Built: 1947
- Built by: W. H. Witt Company
- Architect: William A. Manley
- Architectural style: Moderne
- NRHP reference No.: 98000567
- AHRS No.: ANC-359
- Added to NRHP: May 20, 1998

The Loussac–Sogn Building is a historic commercial building at 429 D Street in downtown Anchorage, Alaska. It is a three-story Moderne-style building, with storefronts on the ground floor and offices above, with its long side extending along 5th Avenue, and its main entrance, on D Street. The based on the building up to the storefront windows is finished in green tile, while most of the building is finished in concrete. The main entrance has a polished stone surround. Built in 1947, it is one of the oldest surviving Moderne structures in the city, and was the largest office building in the city at its completion. It was planned by Zachariah J. Loussac and Dr. Harold Sogn as a small building to house Dr. Sogn's medical practice, but grew in the design to its more substantial form.

The building was listed on the National Register of Historic Places in 1998.

== See also ==
- National Register of Historic Places listings in Anchorage, Alaska
