= N. Lester Troast =

American architect

- Born: July 20, 1899; Bergen County, New Jersey
- Died: October 9, 1958 (aged 59); Clifton, New Jersey
- Occupation: Architect
- Practice: N. L. Troast; N. L. Troast & Associates

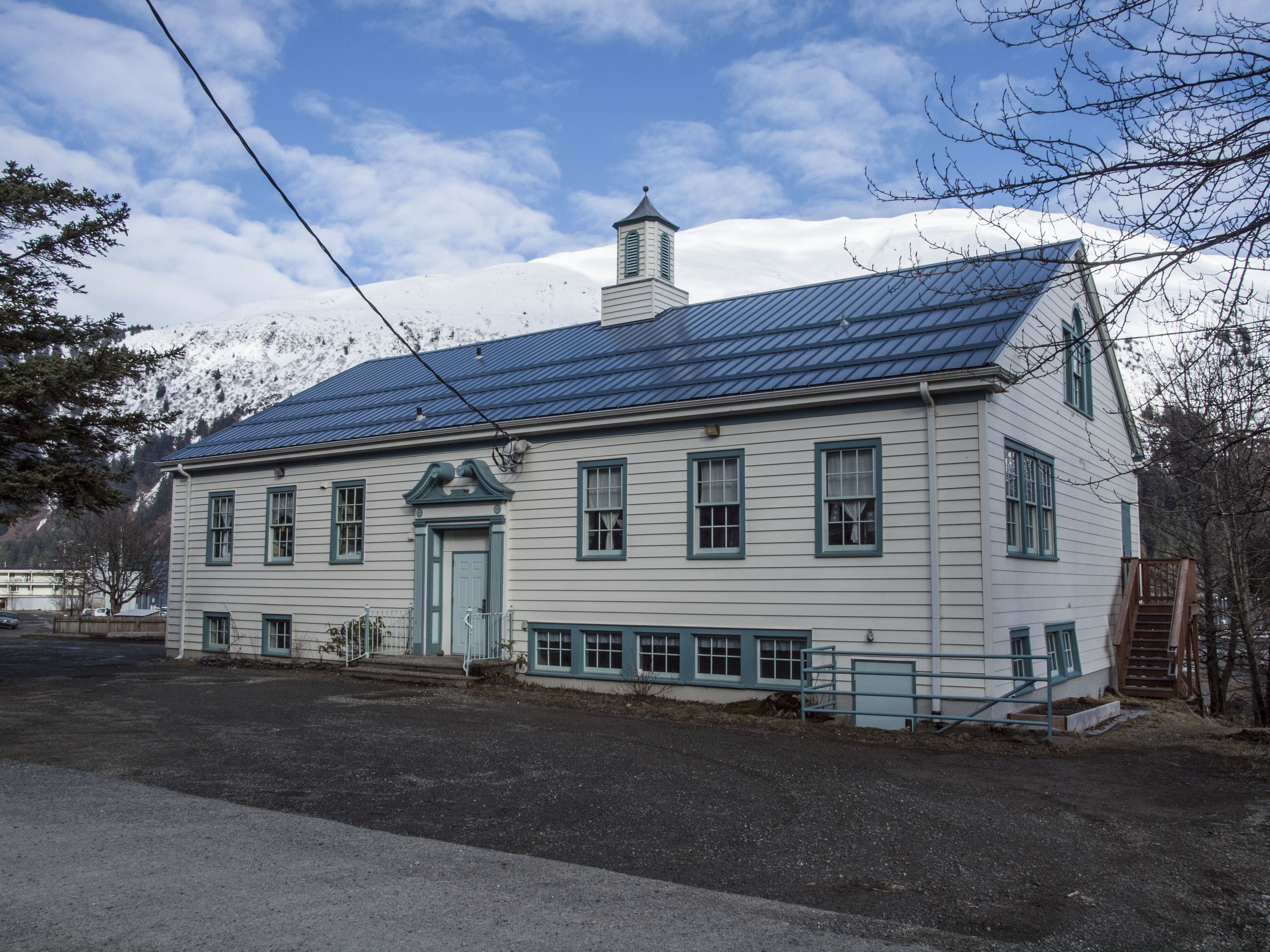
Mayflower School, Douglas, 1933.

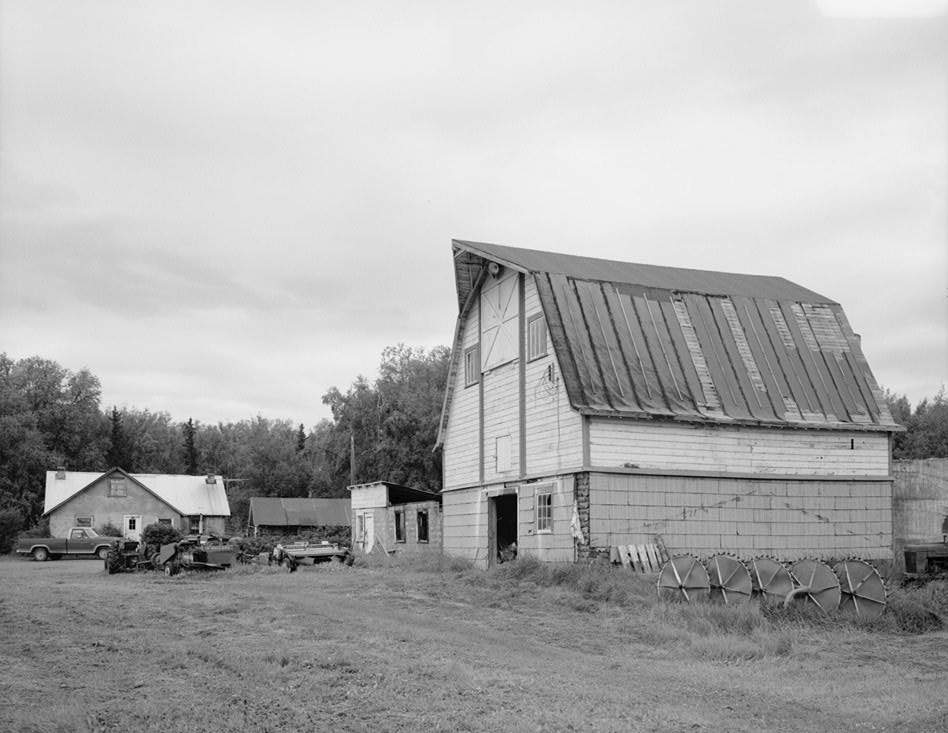
Buildings, Matanuska Valley Colony, 1935.

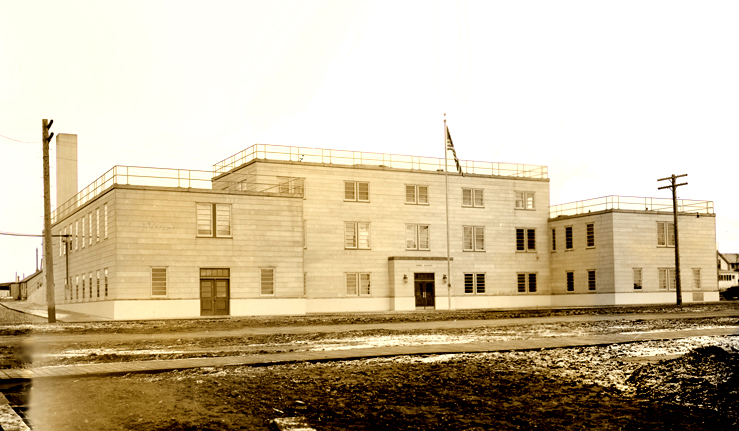
U. S. Federal Building, Nome, 1935.

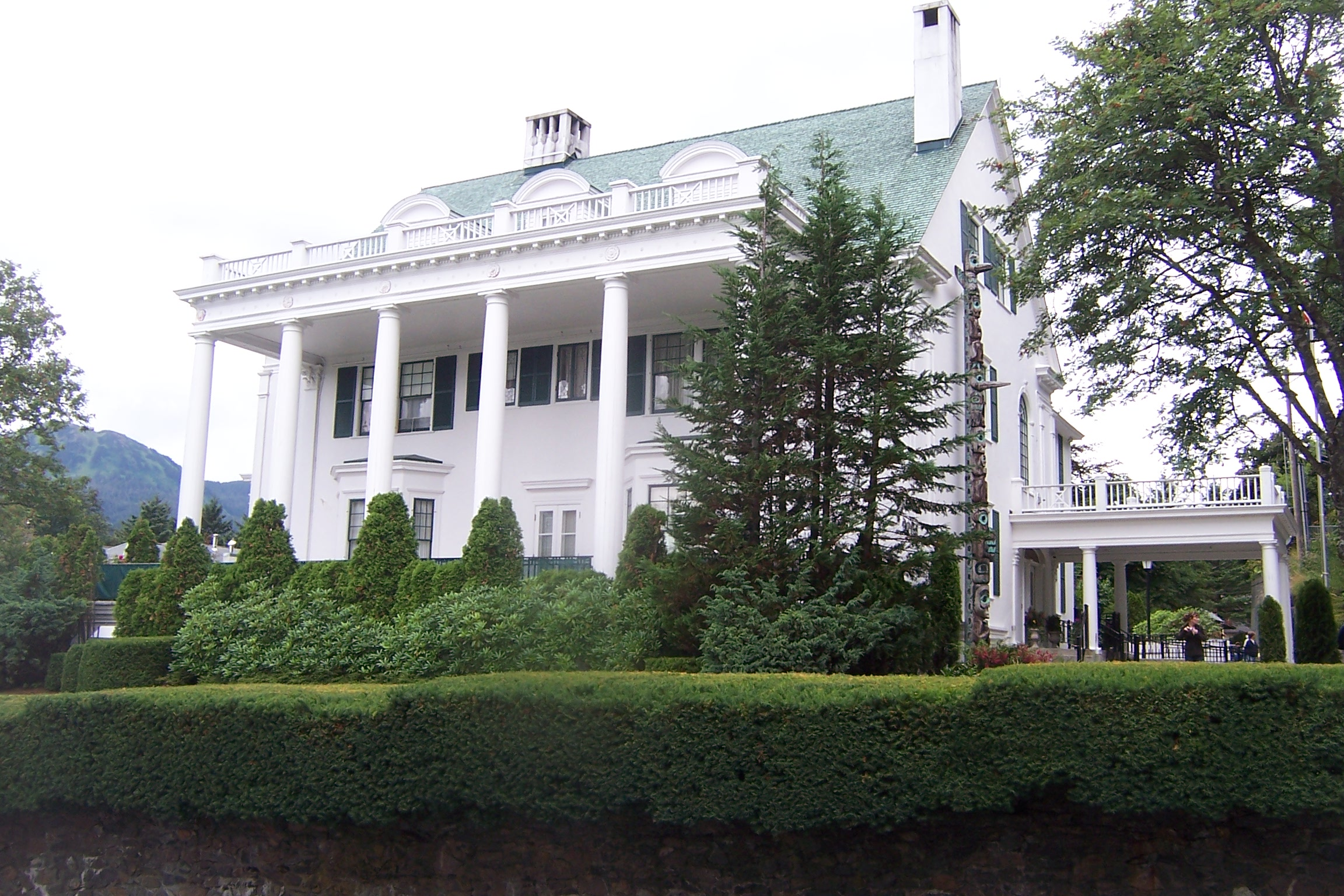
Governor's Mansion, Juneau, 1936.

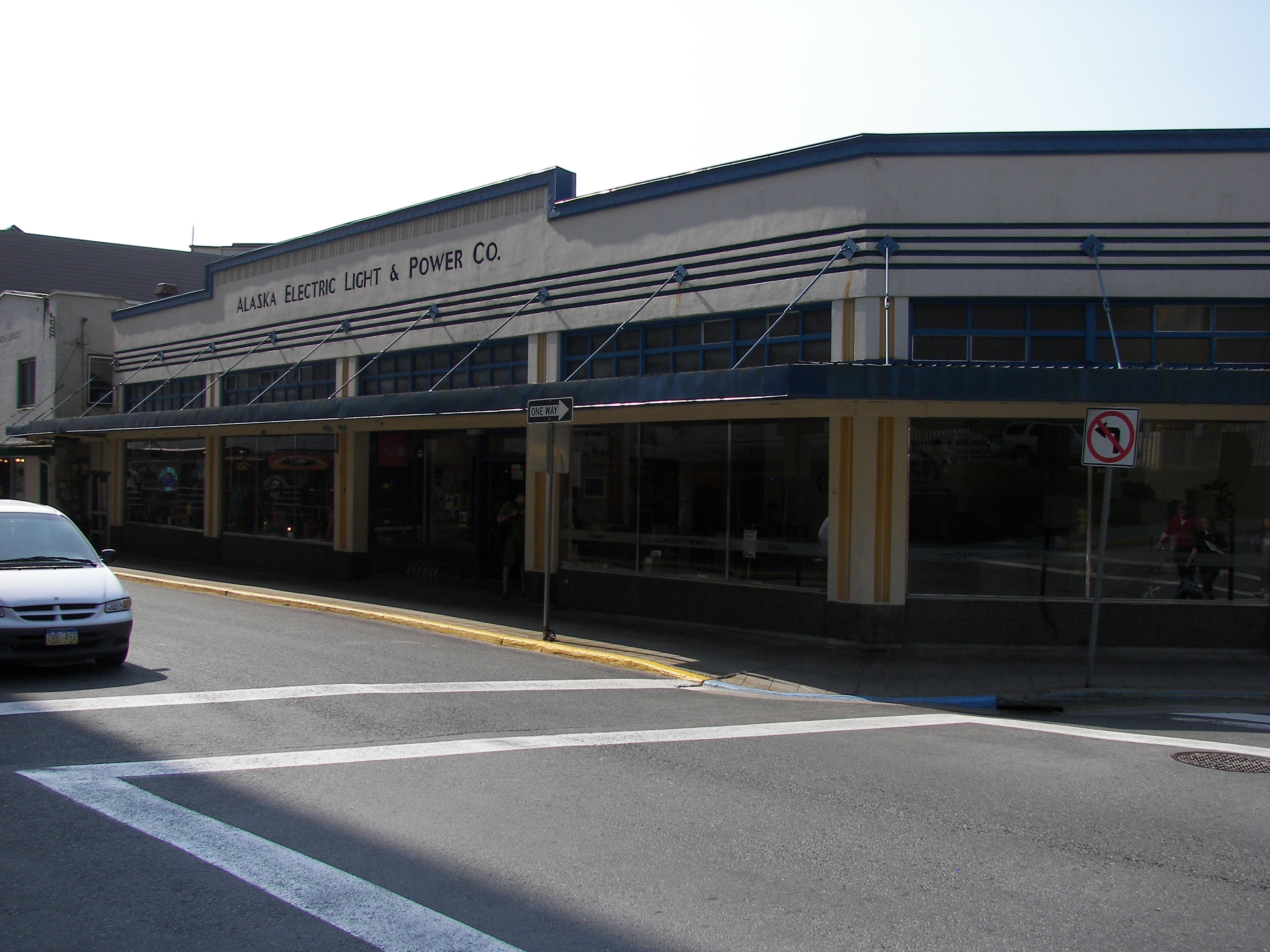
Light and Power Building, Juneau, 1936.

N. Lester Troast (1899–1958) was an American architect from Sitka and Juneau, Alaska, who was one of the first professional architects to practice in Alaska.

== Life and career ==
N. Lester Troast was born on July 20, 1899 in Bergen County, New Jersey. He began his career in the 1920s, as a teacher at Sitka's Sheldon Jackson School. Circa 1930, he left the school and established an architect's office in Sitka. At that time, he was noted as Alaska's only professional architect. Later that year he moved his office to Juneau, the largest city in the then-territory. He quickly associated with William A. Manley, who would become a partner in N. Lester Troast & Associates in 1935. Manley was sent to Anchorage in late 1937 to open an office for the firm in that city. Troast moved to New Jersey, and Manley opened his own Anchorage office in 1941.

In New Jersey, Troast lived in Clifton, and was associated with the family firm, the Mahoney-Troast Construction Company, headquartered in Passaic.

William Manley would go on to have a notable career as the senior partner in the Anchorage firm of Manley & Mayer.

== Works ==
=== N. Lester Troast, before 1935 ===
- 1929 - Sage Memorial Building, Sheldon Jackson School, Sitka, Alaska
- 1930 - Eielson Memorial Building, University of Alaska, Fairbanks, Alaska
  - Completed in 1940 by the H. B. Foss Company.
- 1932 - St. Peter's Episcopal Church (Alterations), 611 Lincoln St, Sitka, Alaska.
- 1933 - Mayflower School, St Anns Ave, Douglas, Alaska
- 1935 - Original buildings, Matanuska Valley Colony, Palmer, Alaska
  - In association with David Williams of Washington, DC.
- 1935 - U. S. Federal Building (Old), Front St & Federal Way, Nome, Alaska
  - With Gilbert Stanley Underwood of Los Angeles.

=== N. Lester Troast & Associates, 1935-1941 ===
- 1935 - Decker Building, 231 S Franklin St, Juneau, Alaska
- 1935 - Juneau Motor Building, 2 Marine Way, Juneau, Alaska
  - Burned.
- 1936 - Alaska Electric Light and Power Building, 134 N Franklin St, Juneau, Alaska
- 1936 - Alaska Governor's Mansion (Remodeling), 716 Calhoun St, Juneau, Alaska
- 1937 - Douglas City Hall, 1016 3rd St, Douglas, Alaska
  - Demolished.
- 1938 - Bunkhouse, Independence Mines, Palmer, Alaska
- 1938 - Shrine of St. Thérèse, 21425 Glacier Hwy, Juneau, Alaska
- 1940 - Howard Romig House, 440 L St, Anchorage, Alaska
