= Susan Henrichs =

- Born: (United States) Anchorage, Alaska
- Education: University of Washington (B.A., 1975), Massachusetts Institute of Technology-Woods Hole Oceanographic Institution joint program (Ph.D., 1980)
- Known for: Marine organic chemistry
- Scientific career
- Fields: Chemical Oceanography
- Workplaces: University of Alaska Fairbanks

Susan Henrichs became provost of the University of Alaska Fairbanks (UAF) in July 2007, after serving as dean of the Graduate School and vice provost of UAF from 2003 to 2007.

== Career ==
Henrichs was born and raised in Anchorage, Alaska. She earned a bachelor's degree in chemistry and chemical oceanography from the University of Washington in 1975, and a Ph.D. in chemical oceanography from the Massachusetts Institute of Technology-Woods Hole Oceanographic Institution joint program in 1980. From 1981 to 1982 she worked as a postdoctoral research chemist at Scripps Institution of Oceanography. She joined the UAF faculty in 1982 as an assistant professor of marine science in the Institute of Marine Science, which is part of the School of Fisheries and Ocean Sciences. She attained the rank of professor in 1994. From 1994 to 2003, Henrichs oversaw the graduate programme in marine sciences and limnology. Her research specialty is marine organic chemistry. Henrichs and her graduate students have studied the detritus of food webs in the Bering Sea and Gulf of Alaska, hydrocarbon contaminants in Kachemak Bay sediments, the adsorption of organic substances by marine sediment particles, and organic matter deposition and preservation patterns in marine sediments. From 1993 to 2007 she has served as the Radiation Safety Officer at UAF.

== Selected publications ==
- Wang, D., S. M. Henrichs, and L. Guo. 2006. Distributions of nutrients, dissolved organic carbon and carbohydrates in the Western Arctic Ocean. Continental Shelf Research 26: 1654–1667.
- Henrichs, S. M. 2005. Organic matter in coastal marine sediments. In A. R. Robinson and K. H. Brink, eds., The Sea, Volume 13. The Global Coastal Ocean: Multiscale Interdisciplinary Processes. Harvard University Press, Boston, pp. 129–162.
- Smith, S. L., S. M. Henrichs, and T. Rho. 2002. Temporal and spatial variation in the stable carbon and nitrogen isotopic composition of sinking particles and zooplankton over the southeastern Bering Sea shelf. Deep-Sea Research Part II 49: 6031–6050.
- Ding, X., and S. M. Henrichs. 2002. Adsorption and desorption of proteins and polyamino acids by clay minerals and marine sediments. Marine Chemistry 77: 225–237.
- Alexander, V., S. M. Henrichs, and H. J. Niebauer. 1996. Bering Sea ice dynamics and primary production. Proceedings of the National Institute of Polar Research Symposium on Polar Biology 9: 13–25.
- Henrichs, S. M. 1995. Sedimentary organic matter preservation: An assessment and speculative synthesis - a comment. Marine Chemistry 49: 127–136.
