= Alaska Film Archives =

Archive of films about Alaska

The Alaska Film Archives, located at the University of Alaska Fairbanks, holds the largest collection of film related material about Alaska. The archive was established in 1968, and consists almost entirely of 16mm film dating from the years 1920 to 1959. Since 1993, the archive has been maintained as a unit of the Alaska and Polar Regions Department in the Elmer E. Rasmuson Library.

== Notable Films in the Collection ==
- The Chechahcos (1924)
- Seppala Collection (1926-46)
- Trip to Cleary Hills Mine (1935)
- Will Rogers and Wiley Post (1935)
- Logan Film Collection (1939)
- Inupiat Dances (1950s)
- People of the Tundra (1956)
- Alaska 49th State (1959)
