= Mayflower School (Juneau, Alaska) =

- U.S. National Register of Historic Places
- Alaska Heritage Resources Survey
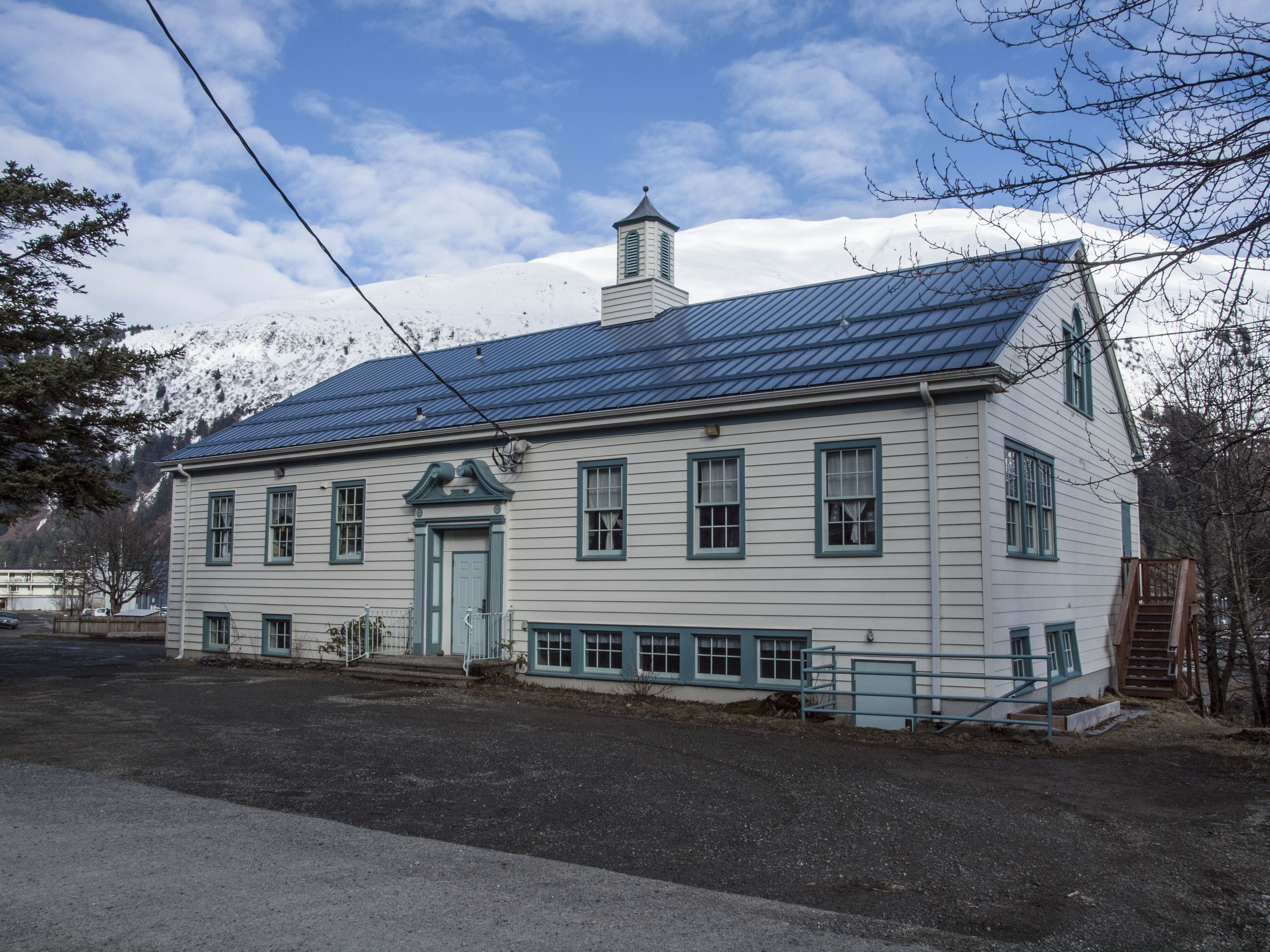

- Location within Alaska
- Location: 750 St. Anns Avenue, Douglas, Alaska
- Coordinates: 58°16′31″N 134°23′32″W
- Area: less than one acre
- Built: 1934
- Built by: US Bureau of Indian Affairs
- Architect: N. Lester Troast
- Architectural style: Colonial Revival
- NRHP reference No.: 88002534
- AHRS No.: JUN-300
- Added to NRHP: November 21, 1988

The Mayflower School, now known as Juneau Montessori School, is a historic school building at St. Ann's and Savikko Streets in the Douglas part of Juneau, Alaska. It is significant as the only surviving historic Native school building in the Juneau-Douglas area. It is also the only Colonial Revival style BIA school in Alaska. Its nomination to the National Register of Historic Places in 1988 asserts the school was "a source of great pride to the Douglas Native community" and that it "represents a significant tie with the past for many Douglas Native people".

It is a rectangular 2 1/2-story wood-frame structure, with a gable roof, and sited in Savikko Park overlooking the Gastineau Channel. It is set on a hillside, and only presents 1 1/2 stories to the front. Its main entrance is on the second level, set in a recessed entryway which is flanked by fluted pilasters and topped by a swan pediment.

The school was built in 1934 by the United States Bureau of Indian Affairs (BIA) to serve as a model school for Native children in Alaska. In addition to educational facilities, the school also contained community meeting facilities, including a library, kitchen, and recreation room. The Bureau intended for the school to provide vocational training and to serve as a community center for the Tlingits of Douglas.

The building served as an educational facility exclusively for Native children until 1940, when it was merged into the Juneau school system. Since 1994, the building has been used as a Montessori school.

The building was listed on the National Register of Historic Places in 1988.

== See also ==
- National Register of Historic Places listings in Juneau, Alaska
