= McKinley Tower Apartments =

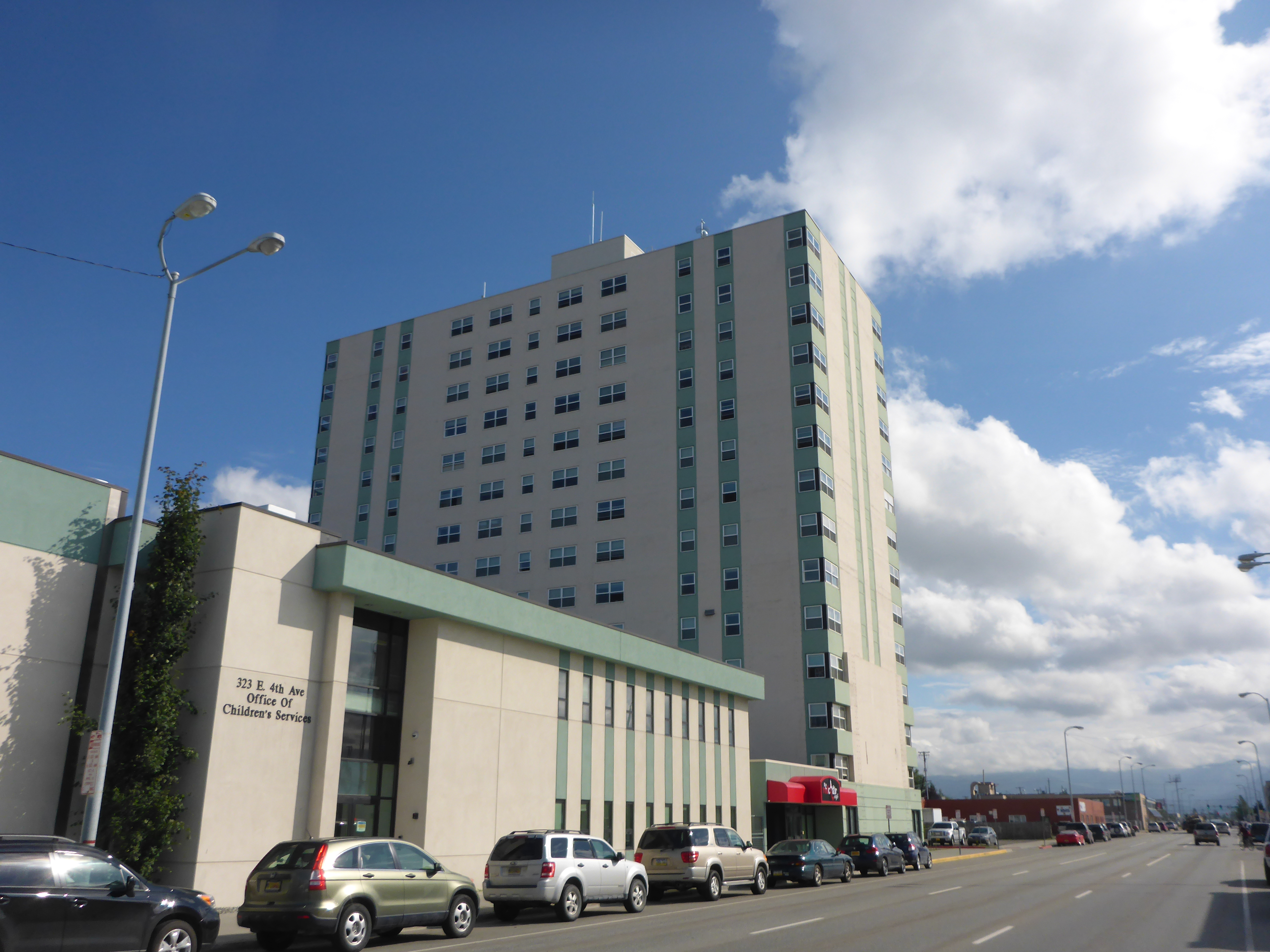
- McKinley Tower Apartments in 2013

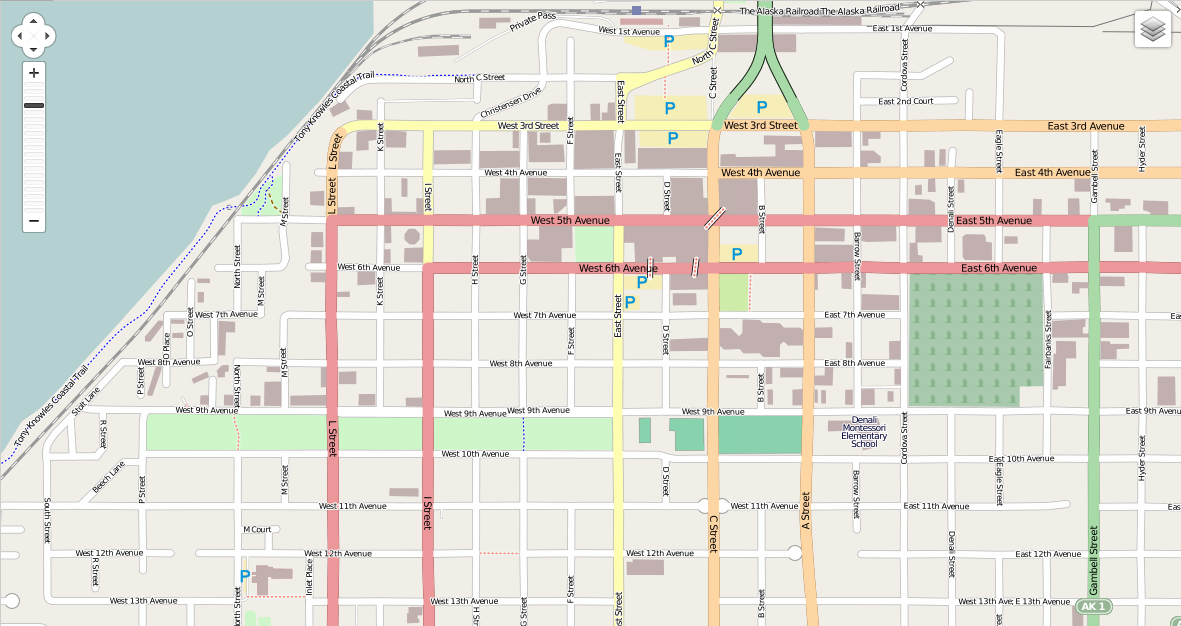
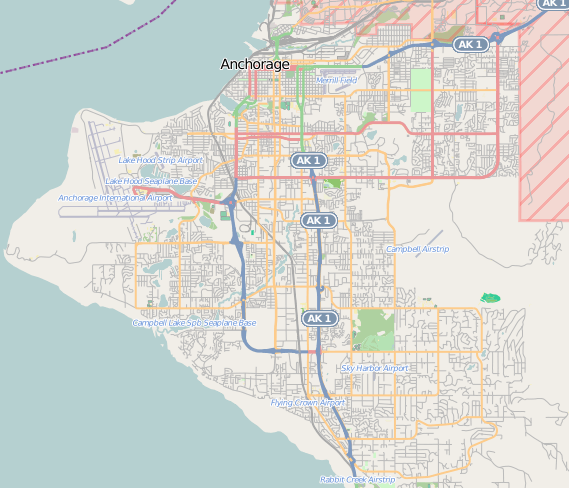
- Location within Downtown Anchorage Location within Anchorage Location within Alaska

General information
- Type: Apartment building
- Architectural style: Early Modernism
- Location: 337 East 4th Avenue, Anchorage, Alaska, United States
- Coordinates: 61°13′8″N 149°52′39″W
- Completed: 1952

Design and construction
- Architect: Earl W. Morrison
- Architecture firm: MacDonald Architects

Website
- www.mckinleytower.com
- McKinley Tower Apartments
- Area: less than one acre
- NRHP reference No.: 08000882
- Added to NRHP: September 12, 2008

The McKinley Tower Apartments, previously known as the East 4th & Denali Apartments, the Mt. McKinley Building, the McKay (or MacKay) Building and the McKinley Building, is a historic apartment building at 337 East Fourth Avenue in the eastern downtown of Anchorage, Alaska. Originally constructed by Swalling Construction owners, John H. Clawson and Albert Swalling, as a 14-story HUD 604 apartment building named the Mt. McKinley Bldg, it is the first, and oldest high-rise in Anchorage. McKinley Tower was designed in 1950 by Earl W. Morrison for MacDonald Architects of Seattle who also designed the nearly identical Inlet Towers at 1020 W. 12th Avenue. The building shares key design characteristics with several other buildings designed by Morrison including: Skye at Belltown in Seattle, WA, the Mendenhall Tower in Juneau, Mary Frances Towers in Ketchikan, and the Cathedral Arms building in Sitka.

== The McKay Building ==
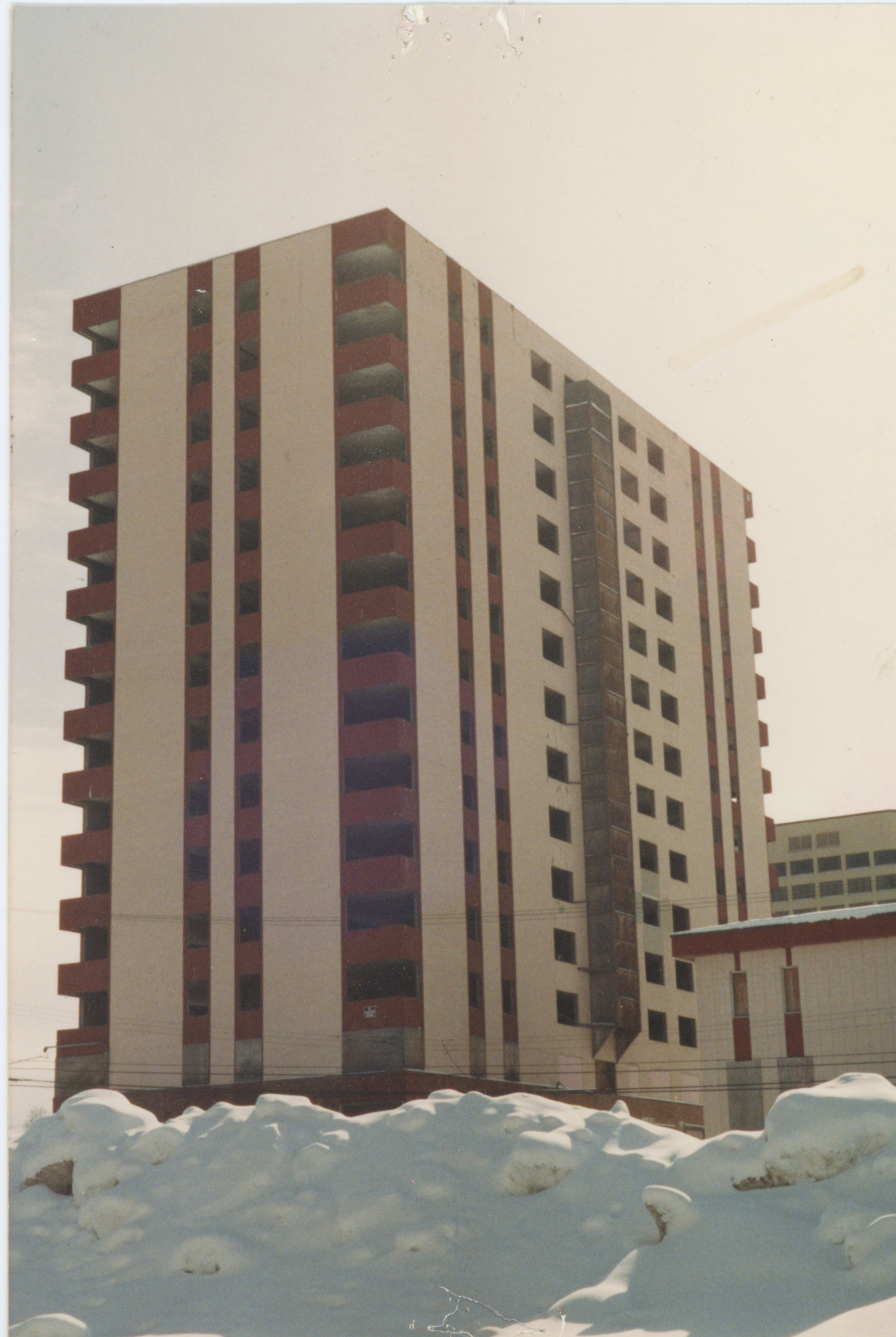

After the building had sat for years following damage in the 1964 Alaska earthquake, it was purchased at auction by Anchorage attorney and real estate investor, Neil S. Mackay. He renamed it the McKay Building (spelling intended) and converted into an office building that housed the State of Alaska's administrative offices and a private penthouse residence occupied by Mackay. The State of Alaska moved out in 1982 when the building was condemned by the city for failing fire codes. The building was completely gutted and stood windowless and abandoned for the next 20 years largely due to Mackay's legal issues in relation to the assassination of his wife Muriel Pfeil and brother in law Robert Pfeil.

== Renovation ==
The tower and annex were purchased in 1992 by Duane Henson and partner Dan Sullivan of Henson and Associates, from a bank that was threatened by the city for costs to tear it down so Henson and associates bought the building and Annex for $25,000 in 1998 Mark Marlow bought it, the Anchorage developer Marc Marlow then remodeled and brought up to code after significant seismic reinforcement work was completed.

McKinley Tower was listed on the National Register of Historic Places in 2008.

== See also ==
- National Register of Historic Places listings in Anchorage, Alaska
