= Charles E. Bunnell =

American judge

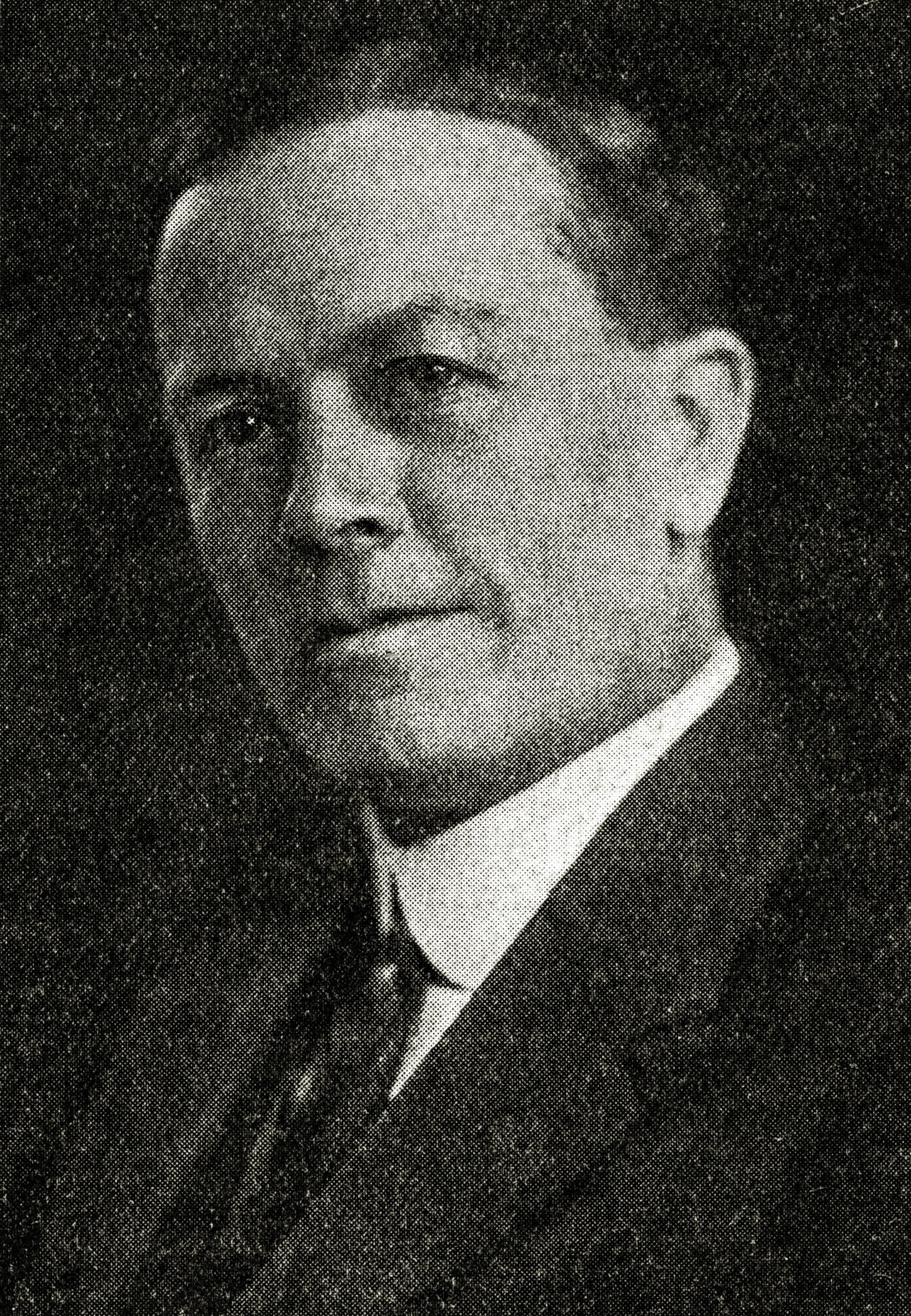

1st President of the University of Alaska (from 1935 – term began as president of the Alaska Agricultural College and School of Mines)
- In office 1921–1949
- Succeeded by: Terris Moore

Judge of the United States territorial court for the Alaska Territory
- In office January 15, 1915 – November 9, 1921
- Appointed by: Woodrow Wilson
- Preceded by: Frederick E. Fuller
- Succeeded by: Cecil H. Clegg

Personal details
- Born: January 12, 1878 (United States) Dimock, Pennsylvania, USA
- Died: November 1, 1956 (aged 78) (United States) Burlingame, California, USA
- Spouse: Mary Ann Bunnell (née Kline)
- Children: Jean
- Profession: Lawyer, college president

Charles Ernest Bunnell (January 12, 1878 – November 1, 1956) was a judge for the Alaska Territory and the University of Alaska's first president, from 1921 to 1949. He ran for Alaska Territorial Delegate to Congress on the Democratic Party ticket in 1914, but was defeated. He was appointed to his judgeship January 15, 1915 by US President Woodrow Wilson, serving as judge on the US Territorial Court in Fairbanks, Alaska for seven years.

On August 11, 1921 Bunnell was appointed the president of the newly created Alaska Agricultural College and School of Mines, which later became the University of Alaska. He served in this capacity for 27 years, through a great amount of expansion, and the Alaska constitutional convention.

The Bunnell Building, built in 1959 on the University of Alaska Fairbanks campus, is named after him. The first presidential residence, built in 1921, was replaced by the current chancellor's residence in 1954. The original structure was moved in 1958, becoming the Bunnell House Early Childhood Lab School. A statue was constructed of Bunnell in Cornerstone Plaza, in the center of campus.
