= University of Alaska Fairbanks =

Public university in College, Alaska, U.S.

- Former names: Alaska Agricultural College and School of Mines (1917–1935); University of Alaska (1935–1975)
- Motto: Ad summum (Latin)
- Motto in English: "To the top"
- Type: Public land-grant research university
- Established: 1917; 109 years ago
- Parent institution: University of Alaska
- Accreditation: NWCCU
- Academic affiliations: UARC; UArctic; Sea-grant; Space-grant
- Chancellor: Ambassador Mike Sfraga
- Students: 6,893 (fall 2024)
- Undergraduates: 5,827 (fall 2024)
- Postgraduates: 1,066 (fall 2024)
- Location: College, Alaska, United States; 64°51′32″N 147°50′08″W
- Campus: 2,250 acres (9.1 km^{2}); Small suburb
- Other campuses: Bethel; Dillingham; Fairbanks; Kotzebue; Nome
- Newspaper: The Sun Star
- Colors: Blue and gold
- Nickname: Nanooks
- Sporting affiliations: NCAA Division II - GNAC; NCAA Division I Independent (hockey); PCSC; RMISA; PRC
- Mascot: Nook
- Website: www.uaf.edu

The University of Alaska Fairbanks (UAF or Alaska) is a public land-, sea-, and space-grant research university in College, Alaska, United States, a suburb of Fairbanks. It is the flagship campus of the University of Alaska System. UAF was established in 1917 and opened for classes in 1922. Originally named the Alaska Agricultural College and School of Mines, it became the University of Alaska in 1935. Fairbanks-based programs became the University of Alaska Fairbanks in 1975.

UAF is classified among "R2: Doctoral Universities – High research activity". In addition to the Fairbanks Troth Yeddha' campus, UAF encompasses six rural and urban campuses: Bristol Bay Campus in Dillingham; Chukchi Campus in Kotzebue; the Fairbanks-based Interior Alaska Campus, which serves the state's rural Interior; Kuskokwim Campus in Bethel; Northwest Campus in Nome; and the UAF Community and Technical College, with headquarters in downtown Fairbanks. UAF is also the home of UAF eCampus, which offers fully online programs. In 2024, UAF updated the name for the College of Rural and Community Development to the College of Indigenous Studies, creating the first college for indigenous studies in the U.S.

In fall 2024, UAF enrolled 7,486 students. Of those students, 61% were female and 38% were male; 87% were undergraduates, and 14% were graduate students. As of May 2025, 1,136 students had graduated during the immediately preceding summer, fall, and spring semesters.

== History ==
=== Founding ===
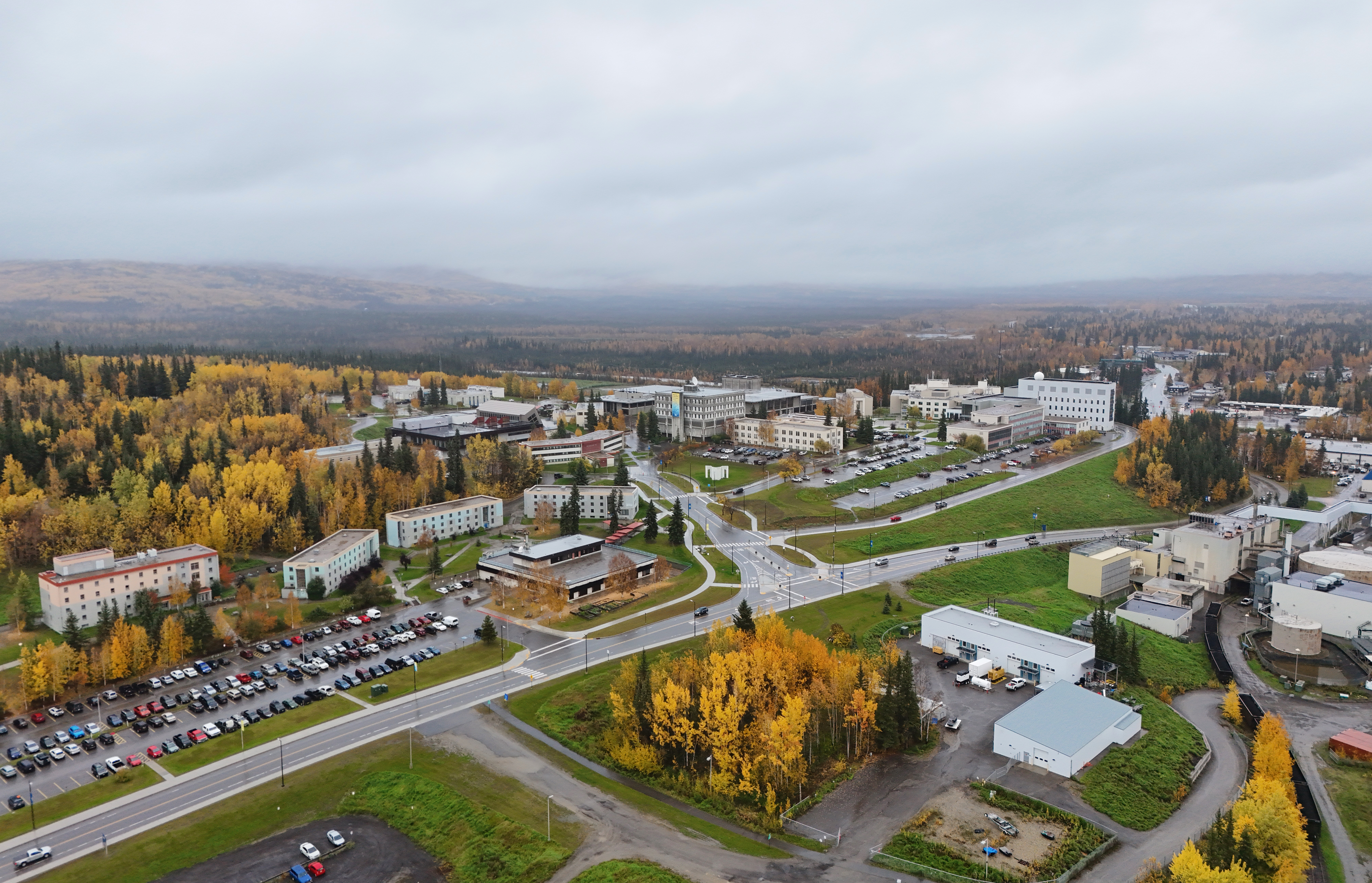
Campus view

The University of Alaska Fairbanks was established in 1917 as the Alaska Agricultural College and School of Mines, but its origins lie in the creation of a federal agricultural experiment station in Fairbanks in 1906. The station set the tone for the strongly research-oriented university that developed later.

In the spring of 1915, the U.S. Congress approved legislation that reserved about 2,250 acres of land for a campus around the research station. It also allowed the federal government to give the college land that had been surveyed and unclaimed in the Tanana Valley; the proceeds from the sale and development were supposed to help fund the operation of the college. However, because most of the land in Tanana Valley remained unsurveyed for years, the college only received 12,000 acres. In 1929, Congress attempted to remedy the situation by granting the college an additional 100,000 acres anywhere in Alaska, but those rights were extinguished in 1959 when Alaska became a state.

Four months after Congress approved the legislation for the campus land in 1915, a cornerstone for the college was laid by Territorial Delegate James Wickersham on a bluff overlooking the lower Chena River valley. The ridge, which the indigenous Athabaskan people called Troth Yeddha', soon became known as College Hill. Charles E. Bunnell was appointed the university's chief executive and served the university for 28 years. Classes began at the new institution on September 18, 1922. It offered 16 different courses to a student body of six (at a ratio of one faculty member per student) on opening day. In 1923, the first commencement produced one graduate, John Sexton Shanly.

In 1935, the Alaska Legislature passed a bill that officially changed the name of the college to the University of Alaska. When William R. Wood became the university's president in 1960, he divided the academic departments of the university into six select colleges: Arts and Letters; Behavioral Sciences and Education; Biological Sciences and Renewable Resources; Business, Economics, and Government; Earth Sciences and Mineral Industry; and Mathematics, Physical Sciences, and Engineering. From that point on, both the university's student population and research mission grew tremendously. With the appointment of Chancellor Howard A. Cutler in 1975, the University of Alaska became the University of Alaska Fairbanks. It was, and still is, the primary research unit of the statewide university system.

University rankings

Global – Overall
- QS World: 901-950 (2026)

The two other primary UA institutions are the University of Alaska Anchorage and the University of Alaska Southeast in Juneau.

=== Significant events ===
The Alaska Constitutional Convention was held in the freshly constructed Student Union Building on the Fairbanks campus from November 1955 to February 1956. While the convention progressed, the building became known as Constitution Hall, where the 55 delegates drafted the legal foundation of the 49th state. The campus' old library and gymnasium was renamed Signers' Hall after the Alaska Constitution was signed there in February 1956.

== Academics ==
Undergraduate demographics as of Fall 2023
Race and ethnicity	Total
White	53%
American Indian/Alaska Native	13%
Two or more races	11%
Hispanic	10%
Unknown	5%
Asian	3%
Black	3%
International student	1%
Native Hawaiian/Pacific Islander	1%
Economic diversity
Low-income (Note: The percentage of students who received an income-based federal Pell grant intended for low-income students.)	31%
Affluent (Note: The percentage of students who are a part of the American middle class at the bare minimum.)	69%

Academic rankings

National
- Forbes: 574
- U.S. News & World Report: 388 (tie)
- Washington Monthly: 269

Global
- ARWU: 801-900
- THE: 401-500
- U.S. News & World Report: 872 (tie)

=== Schools and colleges ===
UAF has nine academic schools and colleges:

- College of Engineering and Mines (CEM)
- College of Liberal Arts (CLA)
- College of Natural Science and Mathematics (CNSM)
- College of Rural and Community Development (CRCD)
- Graduate School
- School of Education
- College of Fisheries and Ocean Sciences (CFOS)
- College of Business and Security Management (CBSM)
- Institute of Agriculture, Natural Resources & Extension (IANRE)

There are 190 different degree and certificate programs available in more than 120 disciplines.

Location of University of Alaska Fairbanks campuses. Red dots represent community colleges.

=== Honors College ===
The UAF Honors College was created in 1983 and provides additional opportunities for students to prepare for professional school admission. Students complete core curriculum courses for their degrees in the Honors Program, maintain at least a 3.25 grade-point average in all courses, and complete a thesis project.

=== Libraries ===
- Elmer E. Rasmuson Library
  - The Alaska Film Archives, housed in the library's Alaska and Polar Regions Collections and Archives, holds the largest collection of film-related material about Alaska.
  - BioSciences Library (permanently closed as of June 2014)
- Keith B. Mather Library (housed in the International Arctic Research Center)

=== Research units ===
UAF is Alaska's primary research university, conducting more than 90% of UA system research. Research activities are organized into several institutes and centers, some of which are listed:

- the Geophysical Institute, established in 1946 by an act of Congress, specializes in seismology, volcanology and aeronomy, among other fields.
- the Research Computing Systems unit, located within the Geophysical Institute, is the high-performance computing unit of UAF.
- the International Arctic Research Center researches the circumpolar North and the causes and effects of climate change.
- the Institute of Northern Engineering, an arm of the College of Engineering and Mines, conducts research in many different areas of engineering.
- the Alaska Agricultural and Forestry Experiment Station conducts research focused on solving problems related to agriculture and forest sciences.
- the Institute of Arctic Biology conducts research focused on high-latitude biological systems.
- the Robert G. White Large Animal Research Station conducts long-term research with muskoxen, reindeer and cattle.
- the Institute of Marine Science, a branch of the College of Fisheries and Ocean Sciences, investigates topics in oceanography, marine biology, and fisheries.
- the research vessel Sikuliaq, a 261-foot ice-resistant ship outfitted with modern scientific equipment, is operated by the College of Fisheries and Ocean Sciences for the National Science Foundation.

=== International collaboration ===
The university is an active member of the University of the Arctic. UArctic is an international cooperative network based in the Circumpolar Arctic region, consisting of more than 200 universities, colleges, and other organizations with an interest in promoting education and research in the Arctic region.

The university also participates in UArctic's mobility program north2north. The aim of that program is to enable students of member institutions to study in different parts of the North.

== Student life ==
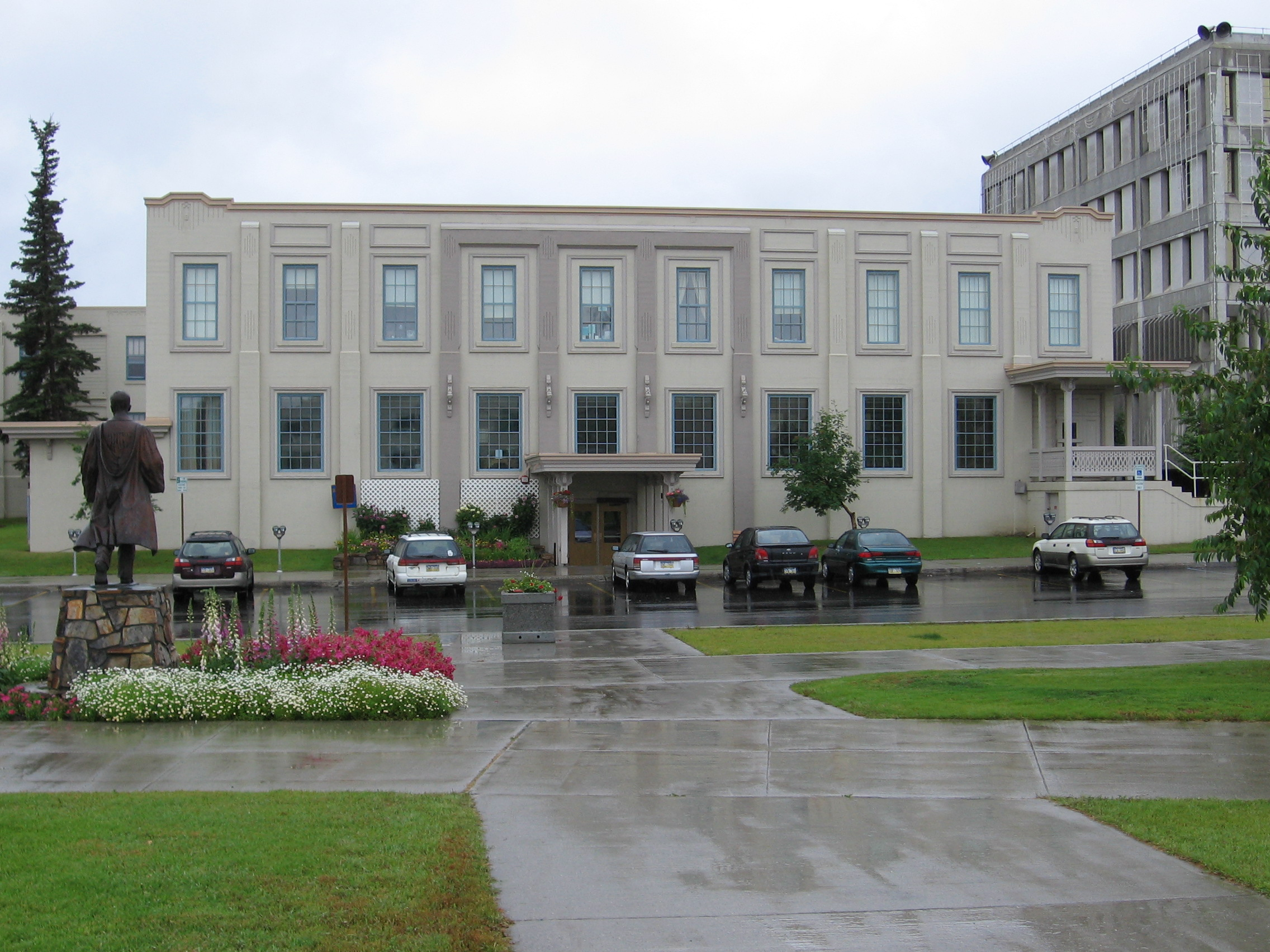
Signers' Hall

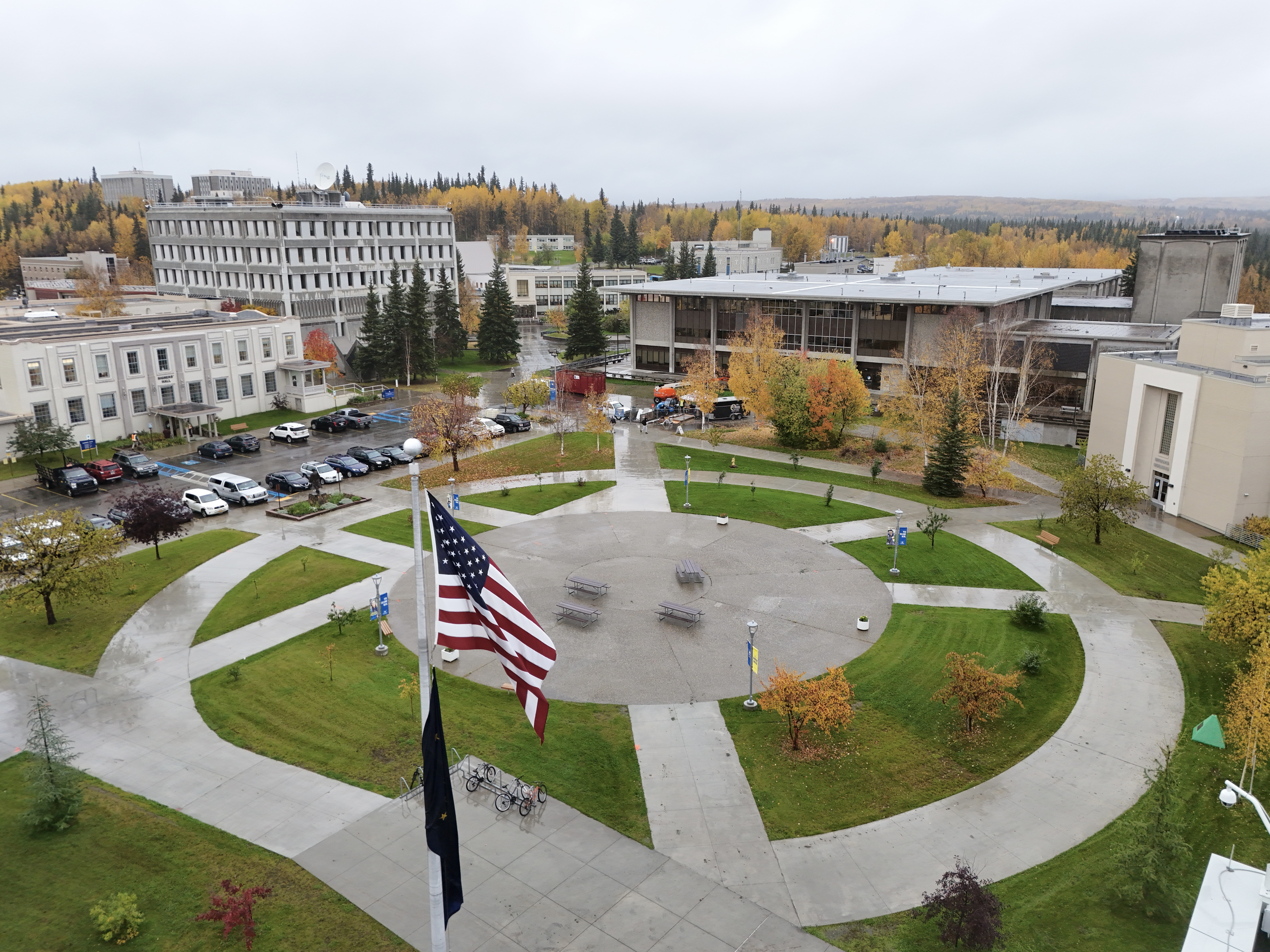
Cornerstone Plaza

=== Housing ===
UAF has several student residence halls on both lower and middle Fairbanks campus. Housing is offered year-round. All halls are smoke-free, as is the entire campus. Each hall has a kitchen, laundry facility, exterior door hall access system and maintenance services. The halls vary from each other slightly to suit different preferences of the student population. Additional housing locations on campus are available to graduates, families, employees and nontraditional students.

=== Representation ===
The Associated Students of the University of Alaska Fairbanks (ASUAF) is the representative group for students attending UAF.

Fairbanks, CTC, and eCampus student pay $53 per credit in Consolidated Fees, students at rural campuses pay $21 per credit; ASUAF receives 2.2% of Consolidated Fee revenue.

ASUAF holds general elections each semester. As per the ASUAF Constitution, there is a president, a vice president and no more than 16 senators, all of whom must be in good academic standing (2.0+ CGPA). Senators, the president and the vice president have terms of one full academic year.

=== Student newspaper ===
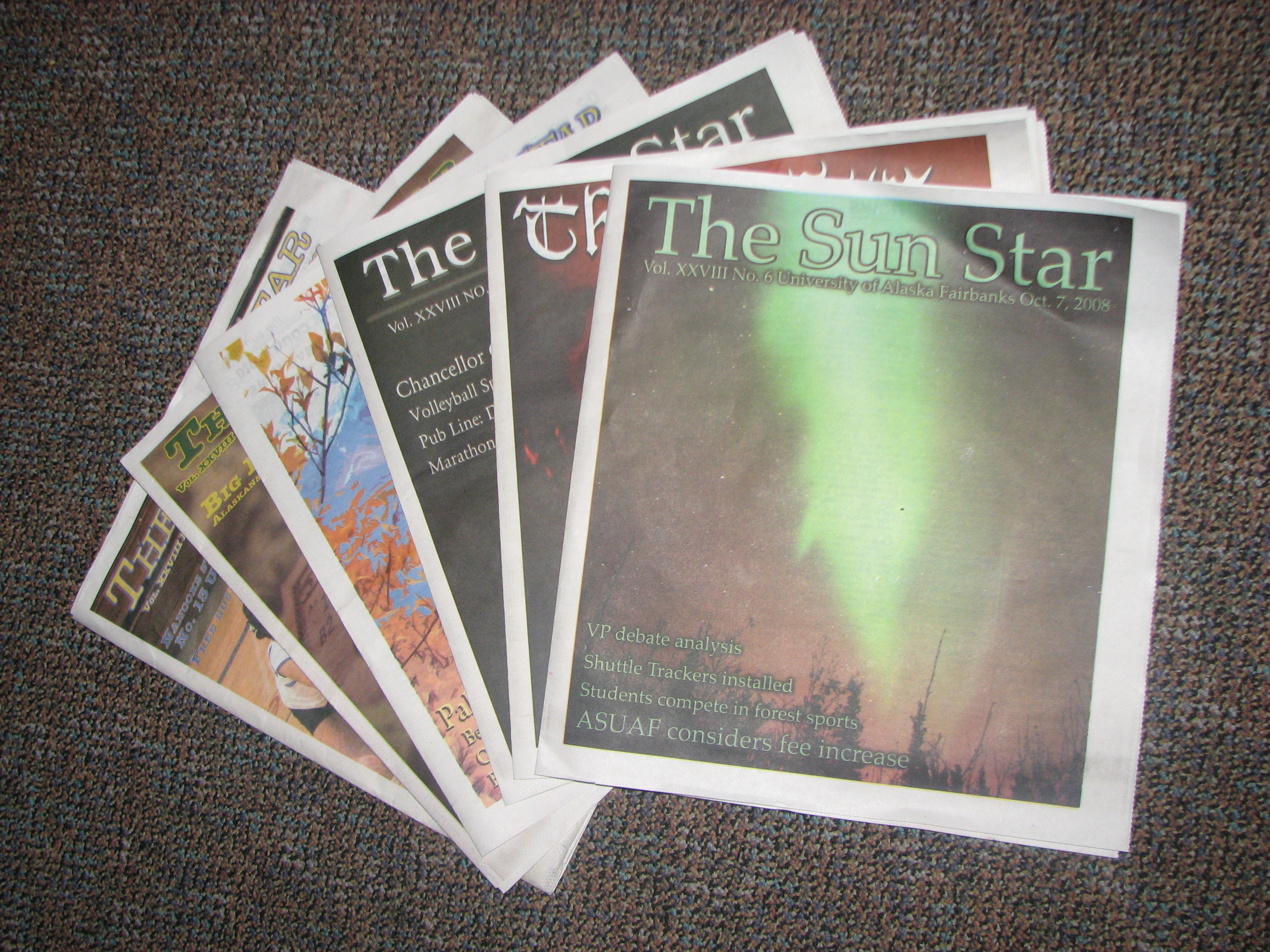
Sun Star Newspaper

The student newspaper is titled The Sun Star, formed after the merger of The Polar Star, an independent student paper, and The Northern Sun, the journalism department's student newspaper. The newspaper has been the recipient of journalism awards from the Alaska Press Club, the Columbia Scholastic Press Association, and other groups.

In addition to news, advertisements for local companies and event listings, the Sun Star website gives the public the ability to access financial information regarding University of Alaska (including UAA, UAS and UAF) employees. In April 2018, The Sun Star transitioned from print to digital-only editions.

== Athletics ==
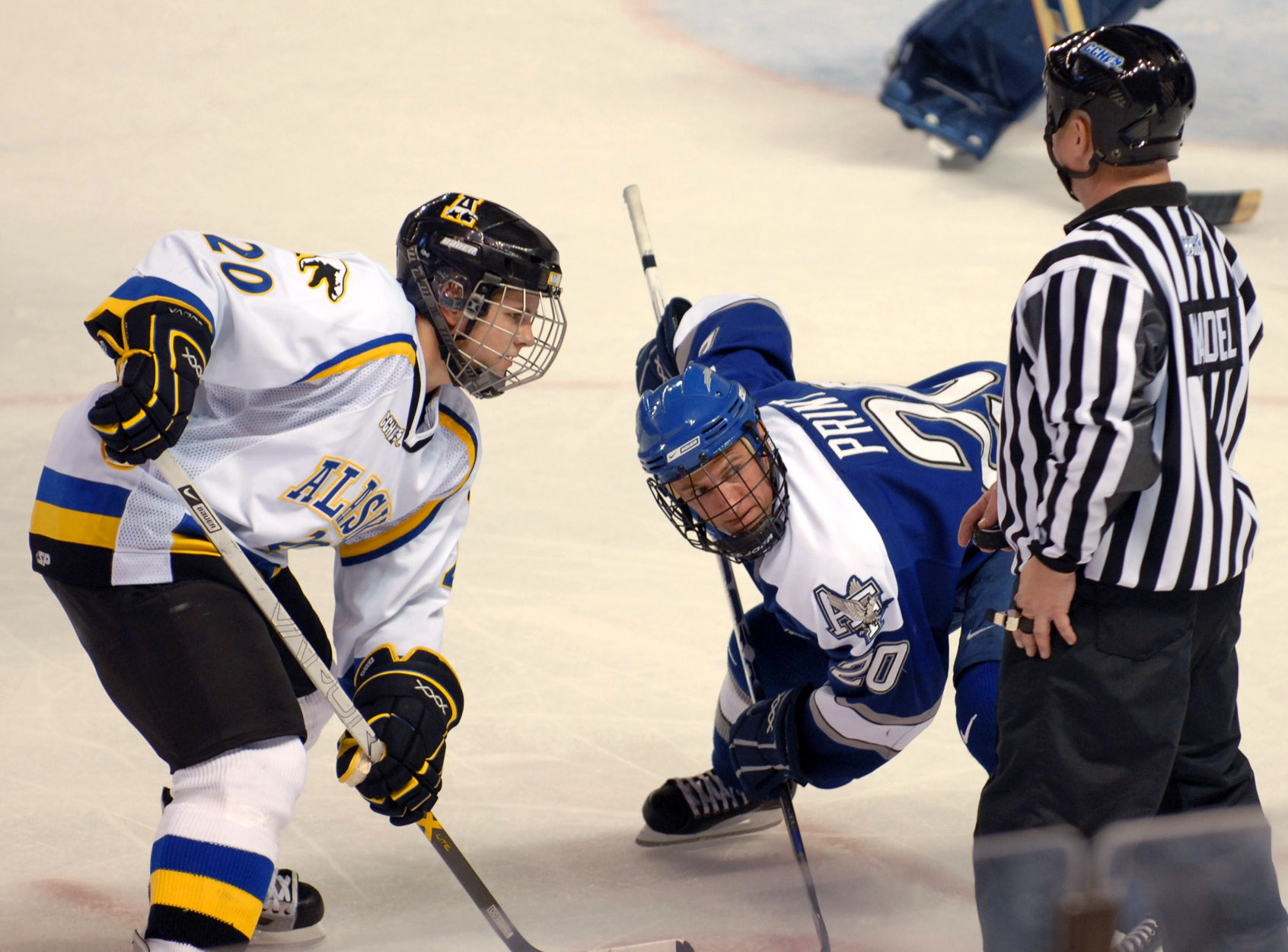
Alaska vs. Air Force ice hockey game

University of Alaska Fairbanks sports teams are the Alaska Nanooks, with the word Nanook derived from the Inupiaq word for "polar bear." Though often known as UAF within the state, the university prefers to be called simply "Alaska" for athletics purposes. The school colors are blue and gold.

The Alaska Nanooks compete at the NCAA Division I level in hockey as an Independent. The Nanooks play home games at the 4,500-seat Carlson Center, located in downtown Fairbanks. The Alaska Nanooks also have a Division II rifle team which has won 11 NCAA National Rifle Championships (1994, 1999–2004, 2006–2008, 2023). The rifle team is a member of the Patriot Rifle Conference. The men's and women's basketball, cross country running, and women's volleyball teams are Division II members of the Great Northwest Athletic Conference, while the women's swim team is a member of the Pacific Collegiate Swimming Conference (PCSC), and the men's and women's Nordic skiing teams are members of the Rocky Mountain Intercollegiate Ski Association (RMISA). The men's basketball team, women's basketball team, and women's volleyball team play home games in the 1,622-seat Patty Center. Due to its isolation from the Lower 48 and the lack of a dome to protect against the harsh elements, Alaska does not have a football program, as is true for all three branches of the University of Alaska.

Since the UAF athletics program was operating at a financial deficit, a new student fee was initiated in 2008. This fee charges UAF students $10 per credit hour they are enrolled in, up to a maximum of $120 per semester. The fee grants students free admission to select UAF athletic events.

In fiscal year 2010, the department was able to meet financial obligations without additional year-end funding for the first time.

The department has increased scholarships for women by 95% since 2005, and was recognized by The Chronicle of Higher Education for Title IX compliance in an article titled "Turnaround Stories."

== Publishing ==
There are several book publishers at UAF, including the University of Alaska Press, the Alaska Native Language Center, Alaska Sea Grant, the University of Alaska Museum of the North, UAF Cooperative Extension Service, and the Alaska Native Knowledge Network. The University of Alaska Foundation also publishes books.

Serial publications include:

- Aurora, produced once annually by UAF University Relations
- Agroborealis, produced twice annually by the School of Natural Resources and Extension
- Ice Box, the UAF student literary magazine
- Permafrost, the UAF English Department's literary journal
- The Alumnus, the UAF Alumni Association newsletter, published twice annually

== Arts ==
The Fine Arts Complex hosts the Charles Davis Concert Hall, the Lee H. Salisbury Theatre and the Eva McGown Music Room. The building is also home to the UAF Art Gallery, which is used for student art shows, thesis shows and faculty shows.

The Reichardt Building was completed in 1994 is a three-story 117,435-square-foot steel-frame structure that features an extensive artwork collection.

== Notable faculty and alumni ==
- Syun-Ichi Akasofu (1961), geophysicist and founding director of the International Arctic Research Center
- Tom Albanese (1979, 1981), former CEO, Rio Tinto Group
- Bob Bartlett (1925), territorial delegate and first Alaska senator
- Ralph R. Beistline, U.S. district judge of the U.S. District Court for the District of Alaska
- Pam Buckway (1973), Canadian politician
- Charles E. Bunnell, first president of the University of Alaska (1921–49)
- F. Stuart Chapin III, professor of ecology at the Department of Biology and Wildlife of the university's Institute of Arctic Biology and president of the Ecological Society of America (2010–11)
- Sydney Chapman, professor of geophysics and advisory director of the university's Geophysical Institute
- T. Neil Davis (BS 1955, PhD 1961), geophysicist and author
- Curtis Fraser (2004), hockey player
- Matthew Emmons (2003), sport shooter and Olympic medalist
- Otto W. Geist, explorer and naturalist
- Ronald Graham (1958), mathematician
- Ben Grossmann (1995), winner of Academy Award in 2012 for best visual effects for the movie Hugo
- Jay S. Hammond (1949), former governor of Alaska
- Jordan Hendry (2006), hockey player
- Susan Henrichs, oceanographer and university provost
- Willie Hensley, matriculate, Alaska Native leader and one of the chief activists for the historic 1971 Alaska Native Claims Settlement Act
- Chad Johnson (2009), hockey player
- Judith Kleinfeld, professor of psychology
- Tyler Kornfield (2013), Olympic cross-country skier
- Rudolph Krejci, professor of Philosophy and founding dean of the university's College of Arts and Sciences
- Cody Kunyk (2014), hockey player
- Ziz LaSota (2013), alleged leader of the Zizians
- Don L. Lind (1975–76), NASA astronaut, who conducted postdoctoral research at the UAF's Geophysical Institute
- Derek Linnell (born 1968), ice hockey player
- Margaret Murie (1924), naturalist and author
- Mark Myers (1994), former director of U.S. Geological Survey
- Brad Oleson, basketball player
- Colton Parayko (2015), hockey player
- Erin Pettit, geophysicist and glaciologist
- George Polk (1938), journalist for whom the George Polk Award is named
- J. Jill Robinson (MFA 1990), award-winning Canadian writer of fiction and creative nonfiction
- George Schaller (1955), one of the founding fathers of the wildlife conservation movement
- Virgil L. Sharpton, vice chancellor for research and planetary scientist (2005-2010)
- Bharath Sriraman (1995), academic, editor, professor of mathematics at The University of Montana
- F. Kay Wallis, traditional healer and politician
- Travante Williams, basketball player
- Nicholas Hughes, biologist
- Gretchen Bersch, adult education activist

== See also ==
- Rainey's Cabin, a log cabin (and one of the oldest buildings) on the campus
