= Montgomery Sicard =

United States Navy admiral

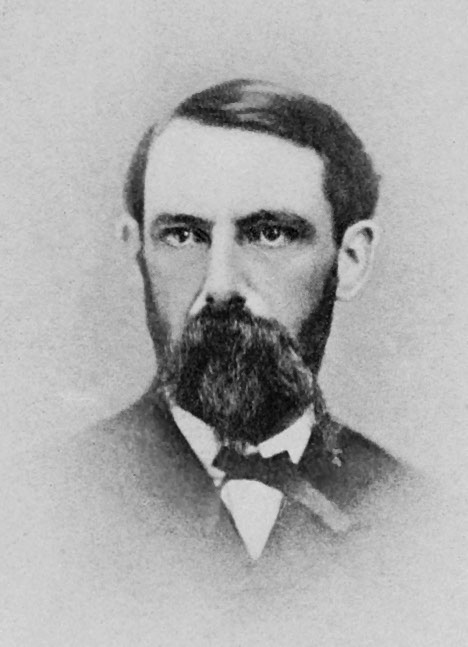
- Born: September 30, 1836; New York City
- Died: September 14, 1900 (aged 63); Westernville, New York
- Military career
- Allegiance: United States of America
- Branch: United States Navy
- Service years: 1851–1898
- Rank: Rear admiral
- Commands: Seneca; Pensacola; Saginaw; North Atlantic Squadron
- Conflicts: American Civil War; Spanish–American War

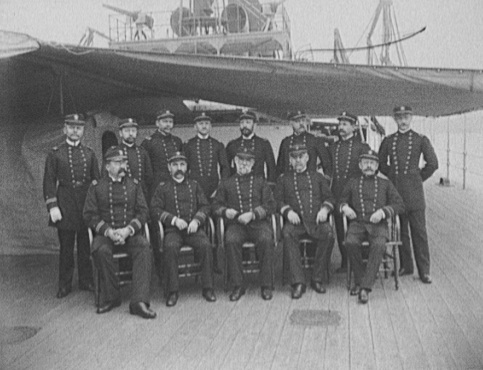
Captain Sicard and the officers of the USS Miantonomoh

Rear Admiral Montgomery Sicard (30 September 1836 – 14 September 1900) was an officer in the United States Navy during the American Civil War.

== Early life ==
Sicard was born in New York City on 30 September 1836. Among his siblings was George J. Sicard, former law partner of President Grover Cleveland.

== Career ==
=== 1851–1861 ===
Sicard was appointed acting-midshipman on 1 October 1851. After graduation from the United States Naval Academy he was made midshipman on 9 June 1855. He was then attached to the frigate USS Potomac from 1855 to 1856 and the steam frigate USS Wabash from 1856 to 1859, in the Home Squadron. He was promoted to passed midshipman on 15 April 1858 and to master on 4 November 1858. He received his commission as lieutenant on 31 May 1860.

=== American Civil War ===
The American Civil War broke out in April 1861. Sicard served aboard the steam sloop USS Dacotah in 1861 and on the steam sloop USS Oneida of the West Gulf Blockading Squadron in 1862–1863. He saw action on the Mississippi River in the bombardment and passage of Forts Jackson and St. Philip, at the Chalmetto batteries, in the destruction of a Confederate flotilla and transports on 24 April 1862, and participated in the subsequent capture of New Orleans, Louisiana, late in April 1862. He took part in the passage of the Vicksburg batteries in Mississippi in June 1862. He was present when the Confederate ram CSS Arkansas attacked the Union fleet on 15 July 1862, receiving his commission as lieutenant commander the next day.

Sicard commanded the Seneca during the two assaults on Fort Fisher in North Carolina in December 1864 and January 1865, and saw further action in North Carolina at the bombardment of Fort Anderson during the Battle of Wilmington on 11 February 1865. He then served aboard the steam sloop USS Ticonderoga in the South Atlantic Blockading Squadron until the war's end in April 1865.

=== 1866–1898 ===
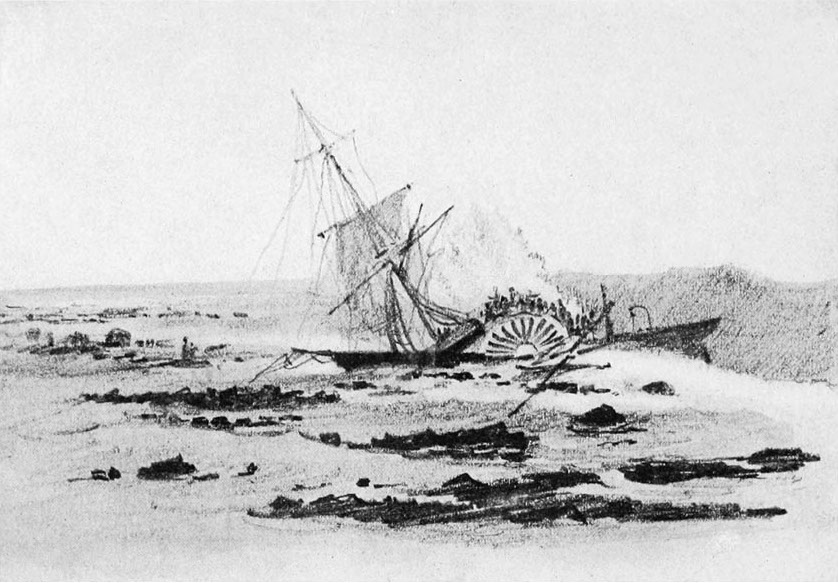
The wreck of USS Saginaw.

Sicard was an instructor at the U.S. Naval Academy from 1866 to 1868, and commanded the steam sloop USS Pensacola in the North Atlantic Squadron from 1868 to 1869. He then took command of the steamer USS Saginaw in the Pacific Squadron, and was promoted to commander on 2 March 1870. On 30 October 1870 Saginaw ran aground at Kure Atoll in the Northwestern Hawaiian Islands and was wrecked. The shipwrecked sailors salvaged supplies from the ship and five men, led by Lieutenant John G. Talbot, set out in a small boat for the main Hawaiian Islands some 1,250 miles (1,090 nmi; 2,010 km) to the southeast. Arriving at Kauai after 31 days, the boat overturned in the breakers, and only Coxswain William Halford survived. King Kamehameha V sent his steamer Kilauea to rescue the sailors stranded on Kure Atoll, all of whom survived.

Subsequently, Sicard alternated command duty afloat with ordnance duty in Washington, D.C., and New York City. He was promoted to captain on 7 August 1881, and served as chief of the U.S. Navy Bureau of Ordnance from 1881 to 1890. He was promoted to commodore on 10 July 1894, to rear admiral on 6 April 1897, taking command of the North Atlantic Squadron. He was forced to relinquish his command at the outbreak of the Spanish–American War in April 1898 due to ill health. Upon his partial recovery, he was placed in charge of the Board of Strategy and took an important part in guiding the conduct of the war.

Hostilities with Spain ended in August 1898. Sicard retired upon reaching the mandatory retirement age of 62 on 30 September 1898.

Sicard was a Companion of the New York Commandery of the Military Order of the Loyal Legion of the United States.

== Personal life ==
In 1863, Sicard was married to Elizabeth Floyd (1835–1923), a daughter of William Floyd, and a descendant of General William Floyd. Together, they were the parents of:

- William Floyd Sicard (1868–1921)
- Montgomery Hunt Sicard (1872–1942), a doctor who married Adelia Avena Ireland, a descendant of Mayor James Duane, 1903.

== Death ==
Sicard died of "apoplexy" at his home in Westernville, New York, on 14 September 1900.

== Namesake ==
The U.S. Navy destroyer USS Sicard (DD-346), which was in commission from 1920 to 1945, was named for Sicard.

Sicard Street, a street inside the Portsmouth Naval Shipyard in Kittery, Maine, is named after Sicard.

The Washington Navy Yard in Washington, D.C., also has a Sicard Street which is named for Sicard.

== See also ==
Military offices
| Preceded by Francis M. Bunce | Commander-in-Chief, North Atlantic Squadron; 1 May 1897–28 March 1898 | Succeeded by William T. Sampson |
