= Murder Cove =

- Cove
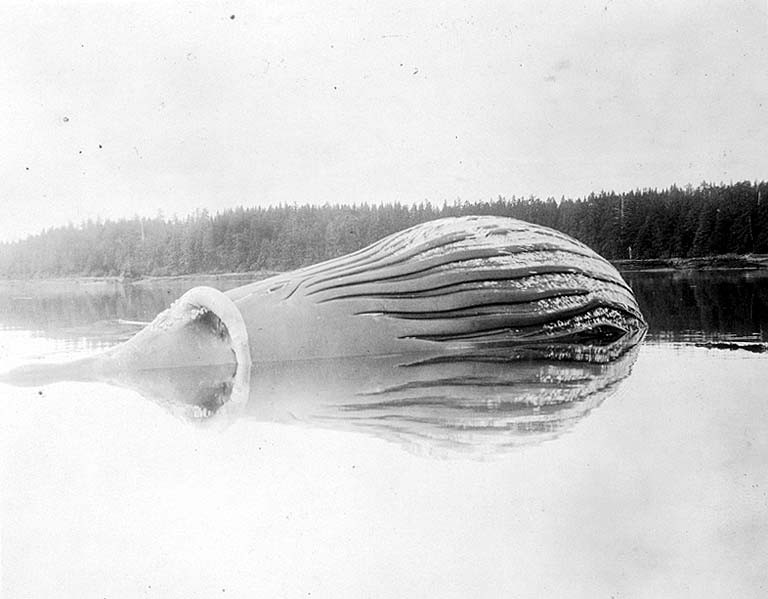
- Whale at mooring, August 1910

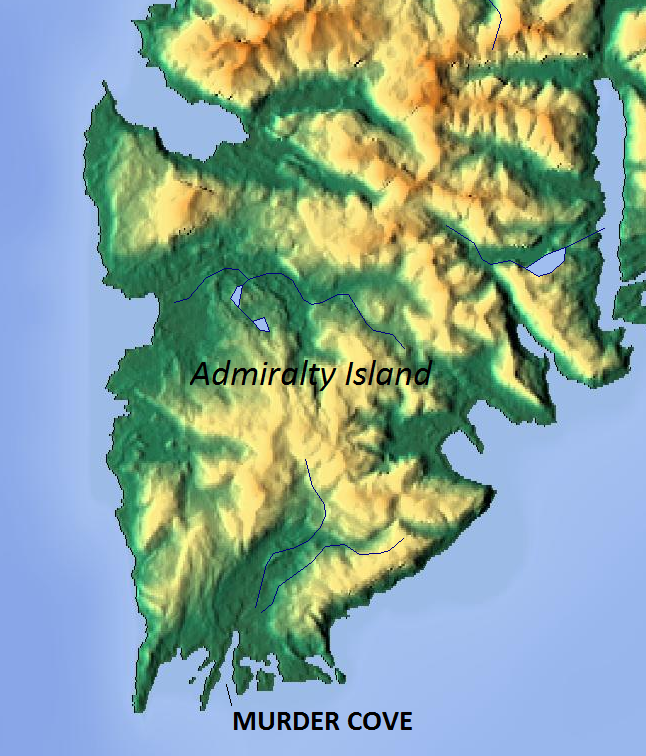

- Location in Alaska
- Coordinates: 57°01′45″N 134°33′20″W
- Country: United States
- State: Alaska
- Time zone: UTC-9 (Alaska (AKST))
  - Summer (DST): UTC-8 (AKDT)

Murder Cove is located at the southernmost portion of Admiralty Island in the U.S. state of Alaska. The cove was home to the Tyee Company whaling station and was known for whaling operations from 1907 through 1913.

== History ==
=== Name ===
The area was named Murder Cove after two gold prospectors were murdered in the area in 1869 as revenge for the killing of two Tlingit tribesmen. In retaliation the USS Saginaw destroyed three villages and two wooden forts near present-day Kake, Alaska. This unopposed destruction of villages and forts by the US Government became known as the Kake War.

=== Whaling ===
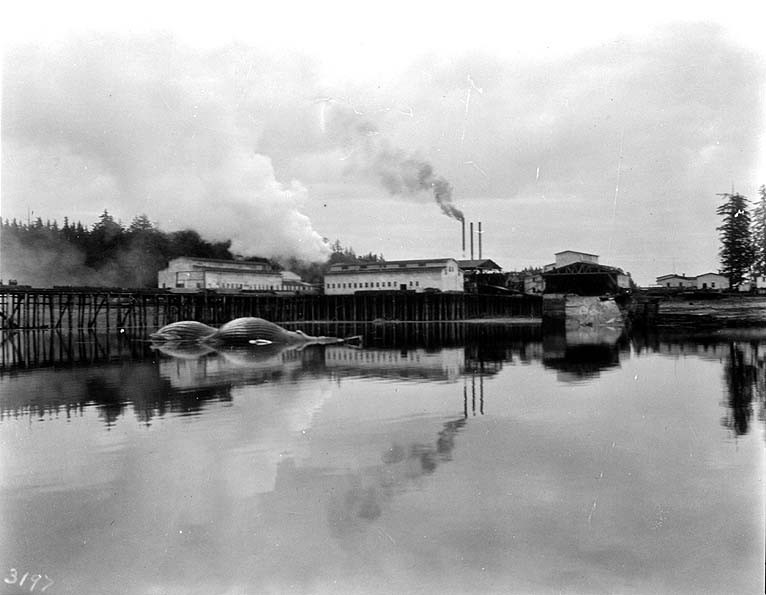
Tyee Company whaling station, August 1910

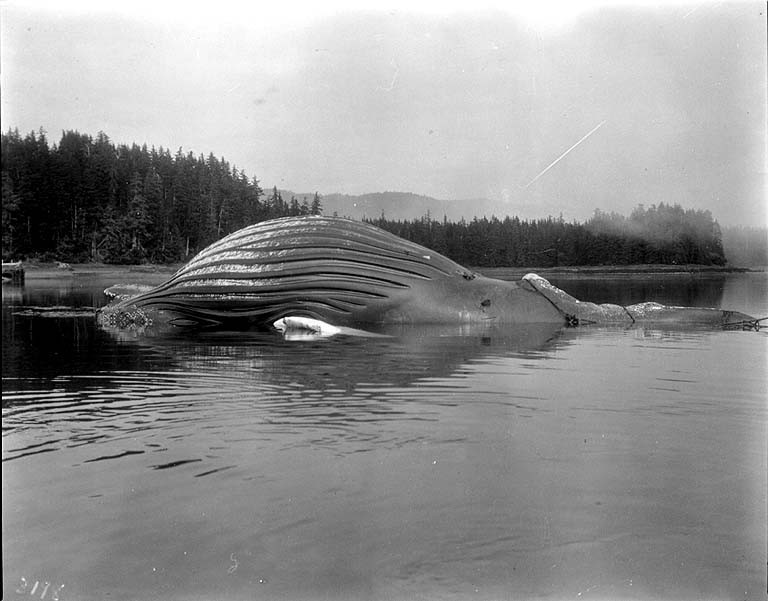
Whale tied up at the float

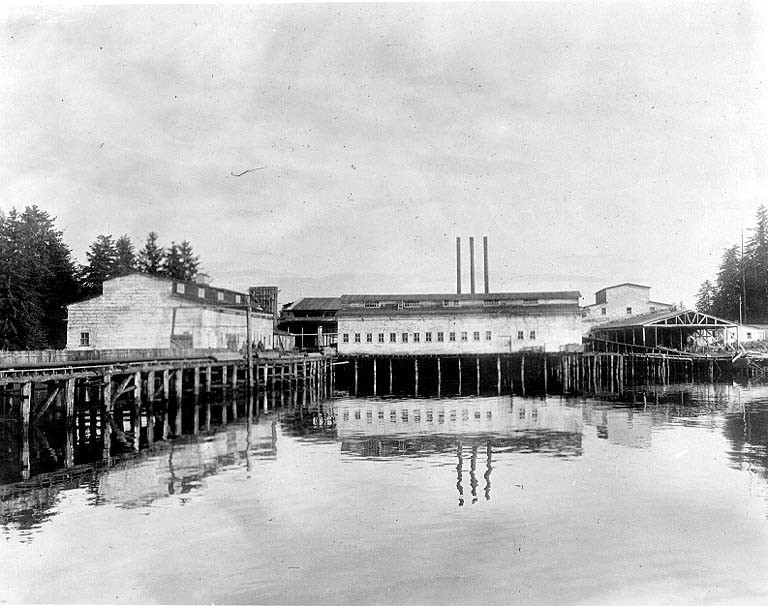
Tyee Company whaling station, July 1911

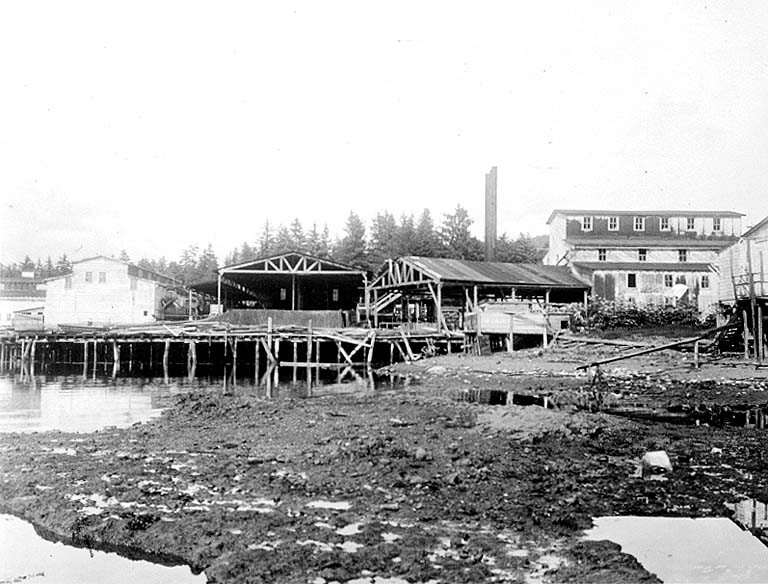
Tyee Company whaling station, 1910

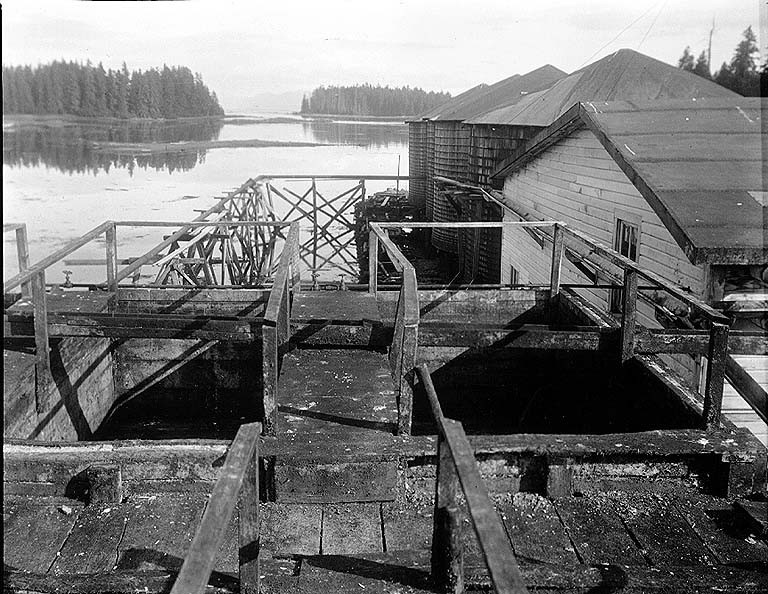
Whale oil tanks at Tyee Company whaling station, July 1911

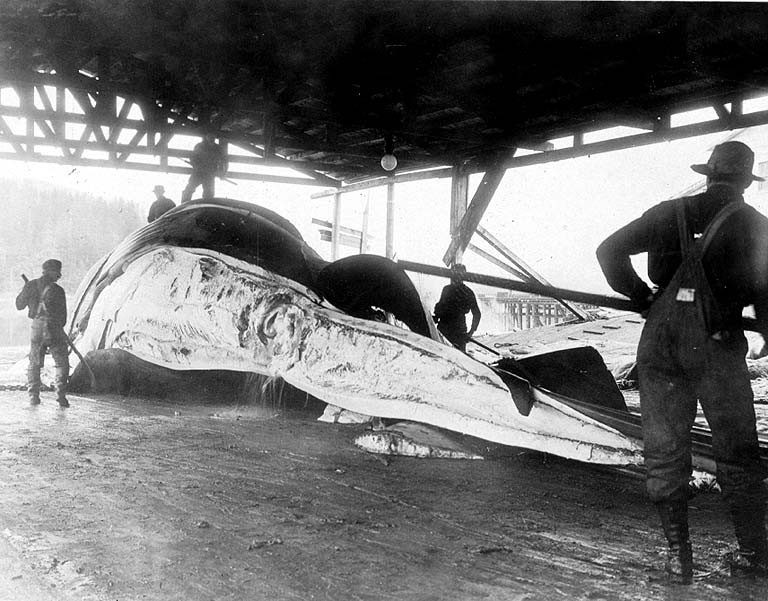
Flensing a whale at the Tyee Co. whaling station

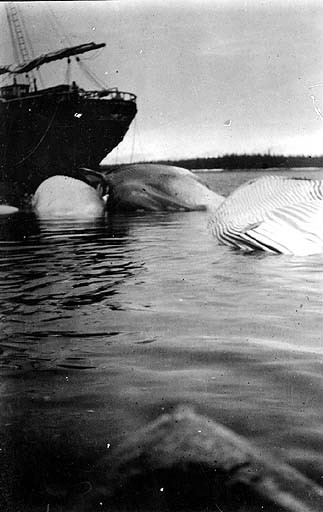
Whales tied to moorings at the Tyee Company whaling station, photo by John Nathan Cobb

Commercial operations in fishing and sea hunting were established inside the bay at Point Gardner by the Tyee Company who sought to take advantage of the unexploited waters of southeast Alaska. They established their operations on Admiralty Island at Murder Cove in 1907 using the first American-built steam-powered whaler, the 97-foot Tyee Junior, which was equipped with a harpoon gun on the bow. Consequent to a declining whale population, the company closed its operations in 1913.

=== Coal exploration ===
In 1905, the most extensive coal exploration in southeastern Alaska occurred at Murder Cove, Kootznahoo Inlet, and Hamilton Bay. The Tertiary-aged coal-bearing formations are made up of conglomerate, sandstone, and shale. The Murder Cove explorations occurred on a 5 feet (1.5 m) thick seam located 2 miles (3.2 km) from deep water. Though this deposit contains the best grade of coal in the region, further development did not proceed because of its very limited size. A lighthouse was established at Murder Cove during the fiscal year 1914.

== Geography ==
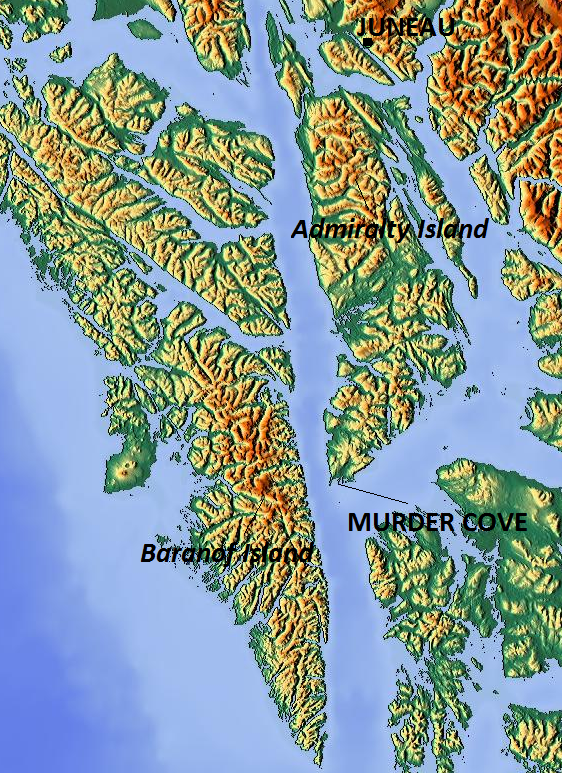
Location

It forms a narrow inlet 2 miles (3.2 km) in length. Just inside the entrance of the bay are several islands, beyond which the channel contracts to a width of 300 feet (91 m) and then opens to form a sheet of water which at high tide is .5 miles (0.80 km) wide and 1 mile (1.6 km) long. This bay forms a well-protected harbor for vessels of moderate size. At its rocky entrance is the Surprise Harbor, which provides safe anchorage and vistas of the area.
