= Organized Village of Kake =

Alaska Native tribe

Organized Village of Kake Ḵéex̱ʼ Kwáan (Tlingit)
- Alaska Native village
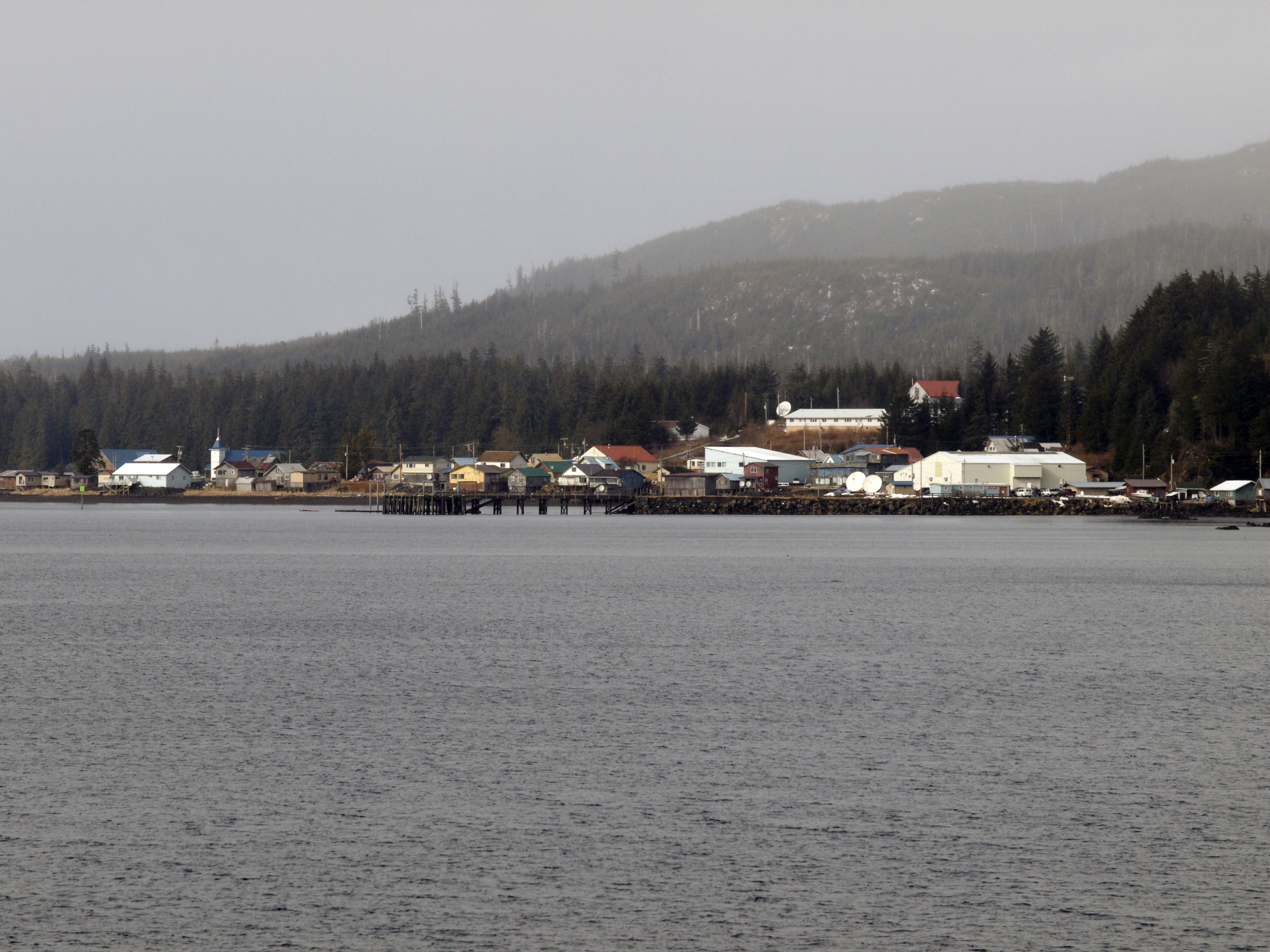
- Kake skyline

- Organized Village of Kake
- Coordinates: 56°57′55″N 133°55′33″W
- Constitution Ratified: November 17, 1947; 78 years ago
- Capital: Kake, Alaska

Government
  - Type: Representative democracy
  - Body: Kake Tribal Council
  - President: Joel M. Jackson

Population (2020)
  - Estimate: 600
- Demonym: Tlingit
- Time zone: UTC–09:00 (AKST)
  - Summer (DST): UTC–08:00 (AKDT)
- Website: kake-nsn.gov

The Organized Village of Kake is a federally recognized Native American tribe of Tlingit people. This Alaska Native tribe is headquartered in Kake, Alaska (Tlingit: Ḵéex̱’). The tribe has 600 enrolled citizens.

== Government ==
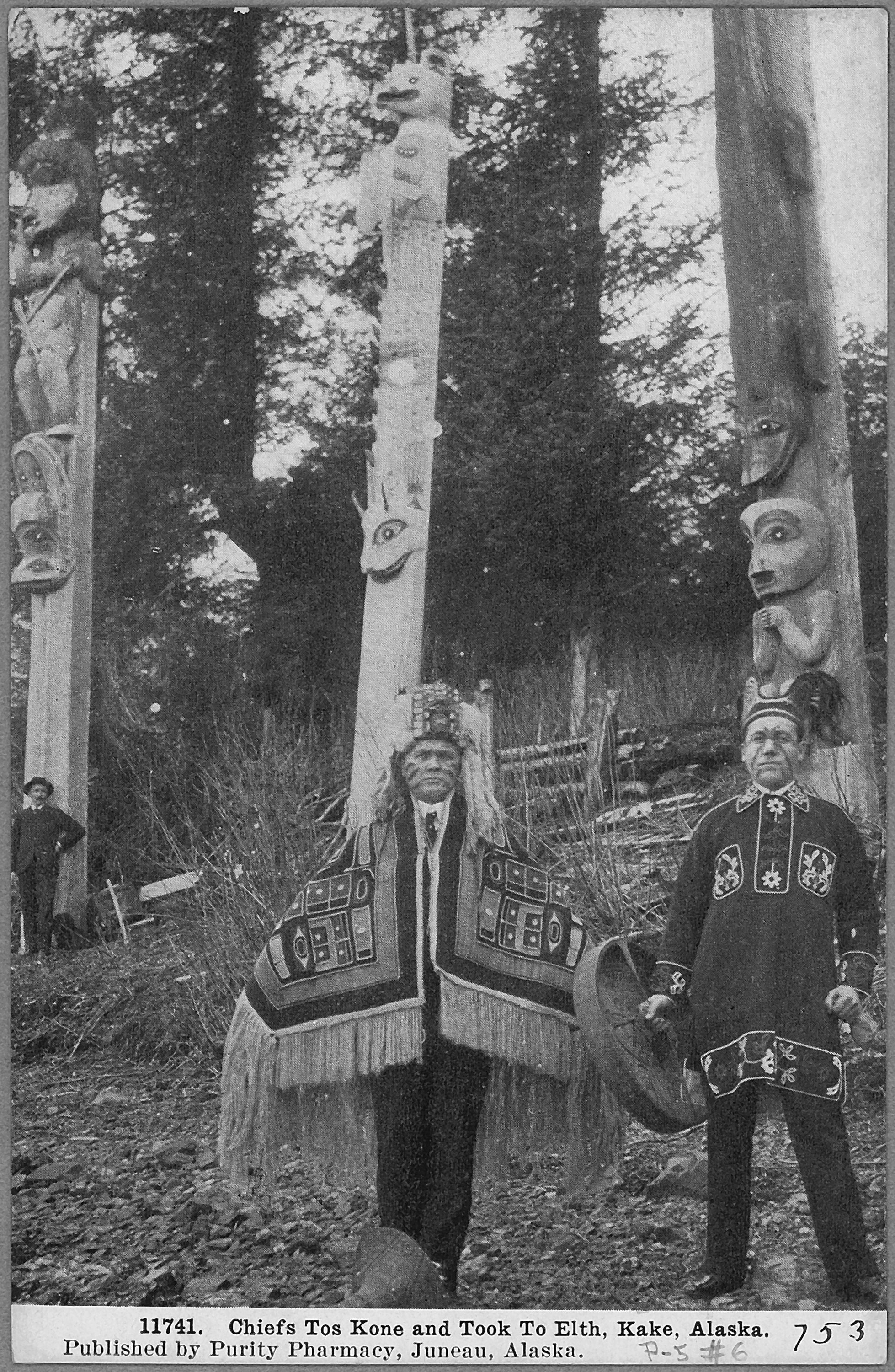
Chief Tos Kine wearing a Chilcat blanket and Chief Took to Elth in front of totem poles in Kake, Alaska

The Organized Village of Kake is led by a democratically elected tribal council. Its president is Joel M. Jackson. The Alaska Regional Office of the Bureau of Indian Affairs serves the tribe.

The tribe ratified its constitution and corporate charter in 1947.

In 1999, the tribe created Circle Peacemaking, it tribal court that draws upon culturally informed dispute resolution and mediatation. By bringing together the accuser, accused, their families, spiritual leaders, and social workers, the Circle Peacemaking court has reduced recidivism to almost zero, and the Harvard Kennedy School Project of Indigenous Governance and Development recognized the court in its 2003 Honoring Nations program.

== Territory ==
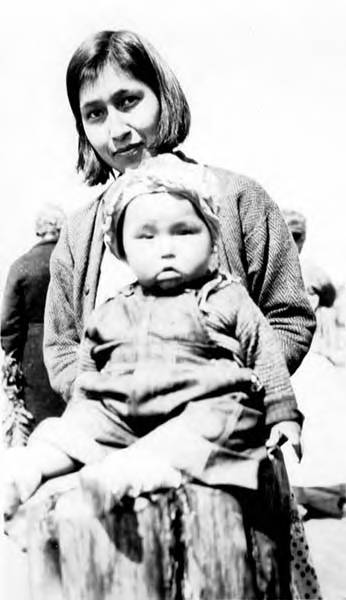
Kake Tlingit woman and baby, 1906

The tribe is headquartered in Kake on the northwest edge of Kupreanof Island and near the Tongass National Forest. Kake can only be accessed by airplanes or boats. Barring foul weather, airplanes arrive daily, and the Alaska state ferry, known as the Alaska Marine Highway, arrives twice weekly.

== Economy ==
Fishing and logging are important industries. From 1912 to 1977, the Kake Cannery was an major employer. Unemployment is between 50 and 80 percent, so subsistence hunting and fishing are important for survival.

The Organized Village of Kake is affiliated with Sealaska Corporation, an Alaska Native corporation, and the Kake Tribal Corporation, an ANCSA Village Corporation.

== Language and culture ==
The Organized Village of Kake speaks English and the Tlingit language. Their Tribal Historic Preservation Officer is Teresa Guadette.

In 2012, the tribe and Mike A. Jackson (Kake Tlingit) collaborated with students and other community members to carved and paint cedar panels depicting Kake families. Thirty of these panels were hung in the Kake Community Hall Gym during the centennial celebration of Kake Day.

== See also ==
- Culture of the Tlingit
- History of the Tlingit
- Kake War, 1869 destruction of three Tlingit villages by the USS Saginaw
