= KCSD =

KCSD may refer to:

- KCSD (FM), a radio station (90.9 FM) licensed to Sioux Falls, South Dakota, United States
- KCSD-TV, a television station (channel 24) licensed to Sioux Falls, South Dakota, United States
- Kake City School District
- Keokuk Community School District
- Kern County Sheriff's Department
