= USS Sicard =

Clemson-class destroyer

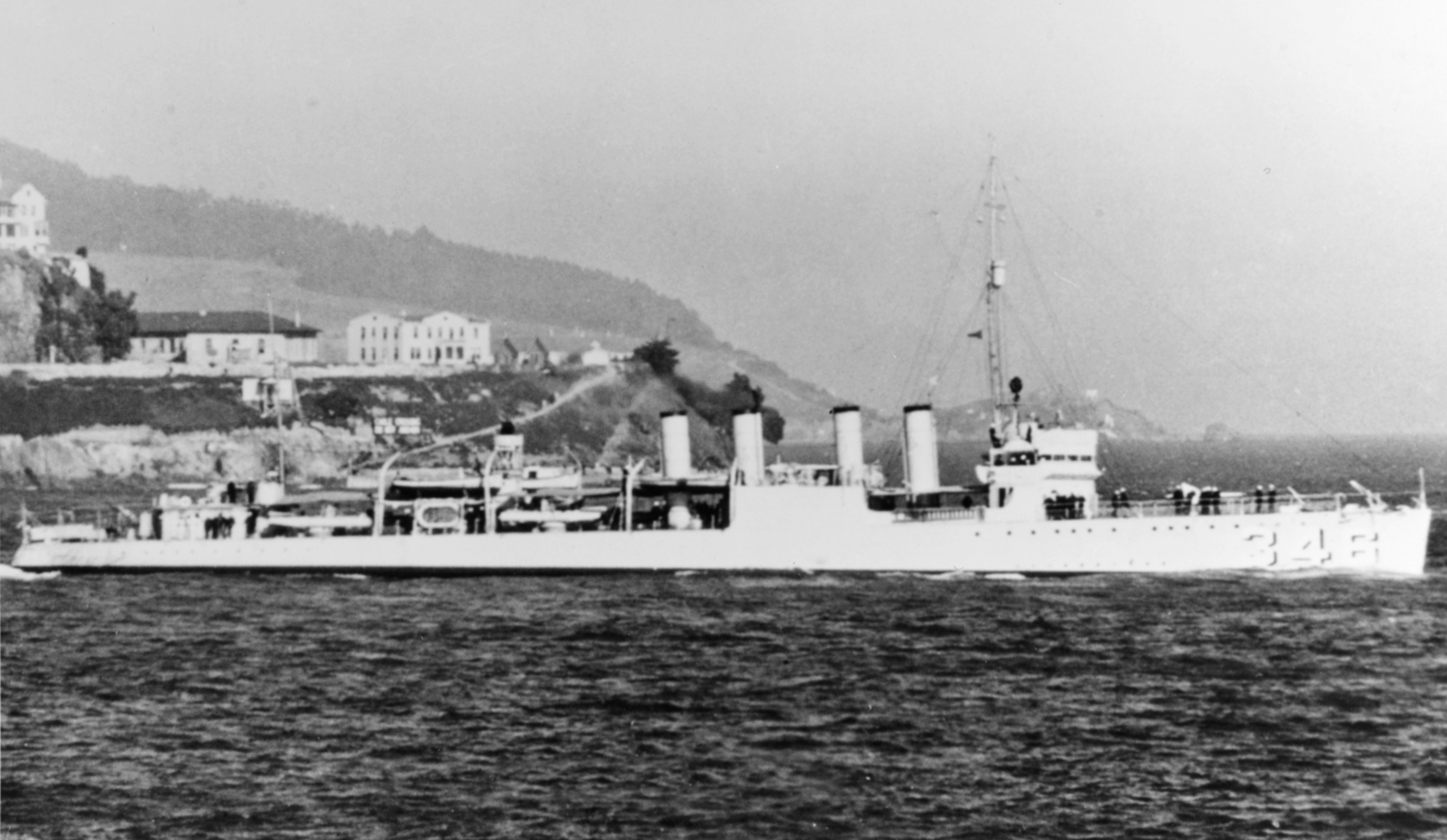
- USS Sicard, probably during the 1930s.

History

United States
- Name: USS Sicard (DD-346)
- Namesake: Rear Admiral Montgomery Sicard (1836–1900)
- Builder: Bath Iron Works, Bath, Maine
- Laid down: 18 June 1919
- Launched: 20 April 1920
- Sponsored by: Mrs. M. H. Sicard
- Commissioned: 9 June 1920
- Reclassified: Light minelayer (DM-21) 20 June 1937; Miscellaneous auxiliary (AG-100) 5 June 1945
- Decommissioned: 21 November 1945
- Stricken: 19 December 1945
- Fate: Sold 22 June 1946; Scrapped

General characteristics
- Class & type: Clemson-class destroyer
- Displacement: 1,215 tons
- Length: 314 feet 4 1/2 inches (95.822 m)
- Beam: 30 feet 8 inches (9.35 m)
- Draft: 9 feet 10 inches (3.00 m)
- Propulsion: 26,500 shp (19,761 kW) geared turbines, 2 screws
- Speed: 35 knots (65 km/h; 40 mph)
- Range: 4,900 nmi (9,100 km; 5,600 mi); at 15 knots (17 mph; 28 km/h)
- Complement: 122 officers and enlisted
- Armament: 4 × 4 in (100 mm) guns, 1 × 3 in (76 mm) gun, 12 × 21 inch (533 mm) torpedo tubes

USS Sicard (DD-346/DM-21/AG-100) was a United States Navy Clemson-class destroyer in commission from 1920 to 1945. She was service during World War II. She was named for Rear Admiral Montgomery Sicard.

== Construction and commissioning ==
Sicard was laid down on 18 June 1919 by the Bath Iron Works at Bath, Maine. She was launched on 20 April 1920, sponsored by Mrs. M. H. Sicard, daughter-in-law of Rear Admiral Sicard, and commissioned on 9 June 1920.

== Service history ==
=== 1920–1929 ===
On 26 June 1920, Sicard joined Destroyer Squadrons, United States Atlantic Fleet at Newport, Rhode Island. She operated on the United States East Coast and in the Caribbean and Panama Canal Zone areas, engaging in battle and torpedo practice and fleet maneuvers and undergoing repairs at the New York Navy Yard in Brooklyn, New York until 1922. In an excursion from her routine duties, she transited the Panama Canal on 20 January 1921, and participated in combined U.S. Atlantic Fleet and United States Pacific Fleet war games and maneuvers in the Pacific Ocean, cruising to Callao, Peru, before returning to the Atlantic Ocean on 24 February 1921.

Arriving at the Brooklyn Navy Yard on 27 April 1922 from spring maneuvers in the West Indies, Sicard underwent repairs and fitted out for duty in the United States Asiatic Fleet. On 15 June 1922, she proceeded to Newport, Rhode Island, where she received torpedo equipment. On 20 June 1922, she got underway with her squadron for her new station, steaming via the Mediterranean Sea and the Indian Ocean to East Asia. The squadron arrived at Chefoo, China, on 26 August 1922, and joined the Asiatic Fleet, with which she operated for seven years, based at Chefoo and Tsingtao, China, each summer and Manila on Luzon in the Philippines each winter. She received periodic overhauls at the Cavite Navy Yard in Cavite on Luzon. She participated in fleet exercises and maneuvers, protected American interests in China, Japan, and the Philippines, and engaged in escort and patrol duty on the China coast and on the Yangtze River during periods of unrest.

On 30 and 31 August 1923, when the violent Great Kantō earthquake destroyed a large part of the cities of Tokyo and Yokohama, Japan, the commander-in-chief of the Asiatic Fleet, Admiral Edwin Anderson, Jr., dispatched all available vessels to that area with emergency supplies to render assistance. Sicard arrived in Yokohama harbor on 11 September 1923 and acted as dispatch boat to Tokyo and transported refugees from the city. From 25 September to 3 October 1923, she was stationed in Nagasaki harbor as radio relay ship, since all radio communications to Yokohama and Tokyo were out of commission. The prompt action of Sicard and other units of the Asiatic Fleet helped save thousands of lives and earned the thanks of the Japanese government.

Between 26 April and 30 June 1924, Sicard again saw special duty, in connection with the flight of four United States Army airplanes around the world. The destroyer cruised from Hong Kong to Rangoon, Burma, and Calcutta, India, guarding the flight and maintaining radio communications.

During the next few years, Sicard's patrols in Chinese waters became more frequent due to the fighting which accompanied Chiang Kai-shek′s and the Kuomintang′s Northern Expedition against Chinese warlords. Her service in the Yangtze Patrol included stints in October 1926, from March to May 1927, in June 1927, and from July to August 1927.

On 22 July 1929, having been relieved by another squadron, Sicard and her squadron sailed from Yokohama, Japan, for the United States. The squadron arrived at San Diego, California, on 17 August 1929.

=== 1929–1941 ===
In October 1929, Sicard joined Destroyer Squadrons, United States Battle Fleet, and for several years operated principally on the United States West Coast, with periodic overhauls at the Mare Island Navy Yard on Mare Island at Vallejo, California. She engaged in fleet concentration problems and battle and torpedo practice, towed targets for submarines and aviation squadrons, and performed plane guard duty and made United States Naval Reserve training cruises. From 15 February to 21 June 1930, she made a cruise to the Atlantic Ocean with the Battle Fleet, participating in the United States Fleet concentration and Fleet Problem X in Caribbean waters and visiting New York City and Hampton Roads, Virginia, for the Presidential Review on 20 May 1930. She took part in Fleet Problem XI, conducted in the Panama Canal Zone and Caribbean area from 4 February to 15 April 1931, and in Fleet Problem XII in Hawaiian waters from 1 February to 22 March 1932. From 24 March to 1 October 1934, she was attached to Rotating Reserve Squadron 20 at San Diego. On 1 October 1934, she joined Destroyer Squadron 4 and continued operations with the Battle Force in the Pacific.

On 12 May 1935, while engaging in Fleet Problem XVI off Diamond Head, Oahu, Hawaii, Sicard was rammed accidentally by the destroyer USS Lea (DD-118) and badly damaged. The minesweeper USS Rail (AM-26) towed Sicard to the Pearl Harbor Navy Yard at Pearl Harbor, Hawaii, where she received extensive repairs before resuming operations with her squadron in August 1935.

In May 1937, Sicard entered the Pearl Harbor Navy Yard for conversion to a light minelayer, and on 20 June 1937 she was reclassified DM-21 in accordance with her new role. Except for a trip to the U.S. West Coast for repairs and training from 20 September to 20 December 1937, Sicard operated in the Hawaiian area through 1941, engaging in division tactics and training exercises, fleet problems, and maneuvers, joint United States Army and U.S. Navy exercises, battle, torpedo and mining practice, and reconnaissance missions around Midway Atoll in the Northwestern Hawaiian Islands and outlying islands. She entered the Pearl Harbor Navy Yard on 21 November 1941 for an overhaul.

== World War II ==
Sicard was still under overhaul at the Pearl Harbor Navy Yard when the Japanese attack on Pearl Harbor took place on 7 December 1941, bringing the United States into World War II and beginning the war's Pacific campaign. Sicard had ammunition only for her .30-caliber machine guns but aided in the defense of the base by sending men to help operate the guns of the heavy cruiser USS New Orleans (CA-32) and the destroyer USS Cummings (DD-365).

On completion of her overhaul on 28 January 1942, Sicard left Pearl Harbor for an antisubmarine patrol station southwest of Oahu, where she escorted ships within her area and searched for Imperial Japanese Navy submarines. Between 1 and 9 April 1942, she helped lay a large defensive minefield at the French Frigate Shoals in the Northwestern Hawaiian Islands, some 500 nautical miles (930 km; 580 mi) northwest of Oahu, and between 10 and 18 April 1942 she set up a United States Marine Corps radio and surveillance station on Eastern Island at Midway Atoll.

On 19 June 1942, Sicard departed Pearl Harbor with other light minelayers, picked up naval mines at Seattle, Washington, and, in July 1942, laid a defensive minefield off Kodiak, Alaska. On her return to Hawaii on 27 July 1942, she resumed her local patrol assignment. She departed Hawaii on 16 September 1942 for the Aleutian Islands to lay another minefield and conduct more patrols. She then proceeded on 22 November 1942 to San Francisco, California, for overhaul.

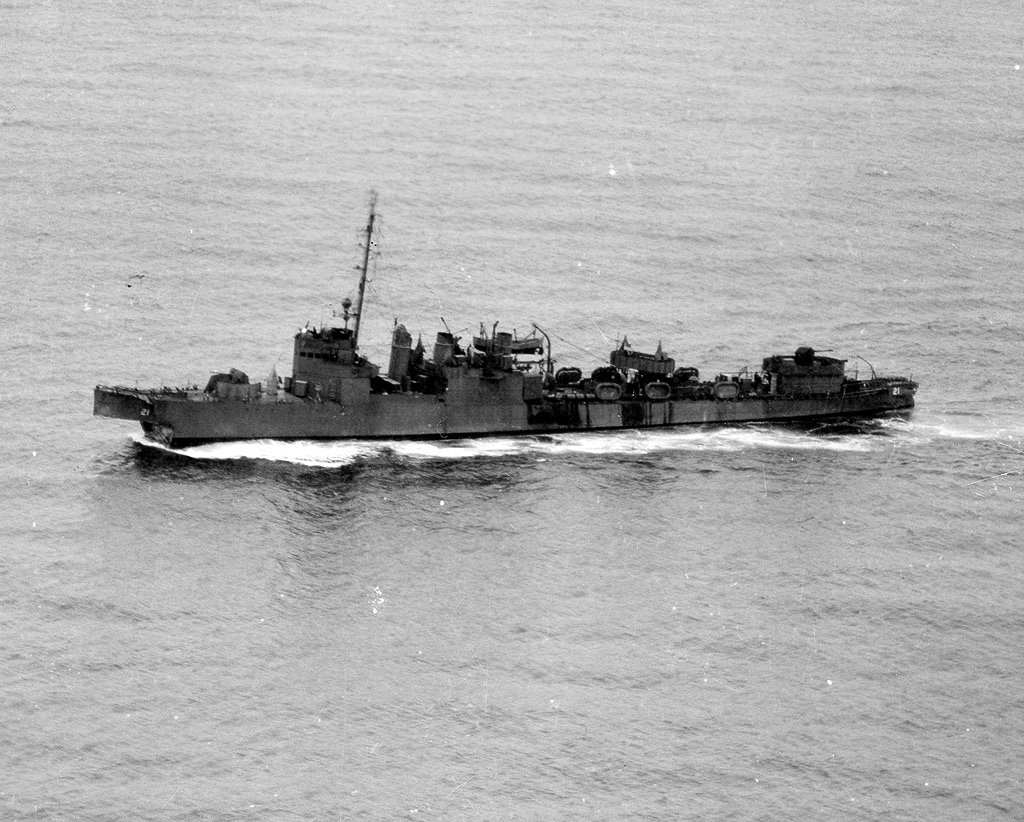
Sicard after her collision with USS Macdonough (DD-351), 19 May 1943.

After completion of repairs on 22 December 1942, Sicard participated in amphibious landing exercises off San Diego. She then departed San Francisco on 24 April 1943 with a convoy of troop transports for the assault on Attu in the Aleutian Islands, scheduled for 11 May 1943. Sicard was to have acted as a landing craft control vessel for the operation, but on 10 May 1943, on the night before the landing, she collided with the destroyer USS Macdonough (DD-351) in a dense fog. Sicard towed Macdonough into Adak on Adak Island, and then proceeded to San Francisco for repairs, which lasted until 29 July 1943. She was more fortunate during Operation Cottage, the landings on Kiska in the Aleutians, and successfully guided the waves of assault boats to the beach there between 15 and 18 August 1943. She performed local patrol and escort duties in the Aleutians, and then escorted a convoy to Pearl Harbor, where she arrived on 15 September 1943.

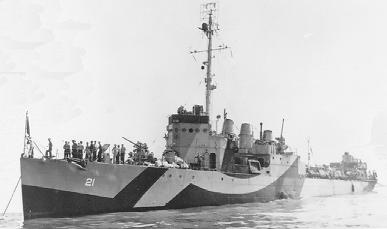
Sicard in 1944.

Sicard left Pearl Harbor on 24 September 1943 for a new area of operations, the Southwest Pacific. She escorted ships to Nouméa on Grande Terre in New Caledonia and to Espiritu Santo, and then continued to Purvis Bay on Florida Island in the Solomon Islands, where she and her sister ships USS Gamble (DM-15) and USS Breese (DM-18), formed a fast minelaying group. The group sortied on 31 October 1943 to plant an offensive minefield off Bougainville Island in the Solomon Islands, where the U.S. I Marine Amphibious Corps landed on 1 November 1943, beginning the Battle of Bougainville. Just as the fast minelayer group completed its mission and began to retire early on the morning of 2 November 1943, it was illuminated by parachute flares from Japanese aircraft. Soon a U.S. cruiser force steamed by at high speed in the opposite direction and opened fire on Japanese ships invisible to the minelayers. Sicard's group had unknowingly helped bring the opposing forces together for the Battle of Empress Augusta Bay.

Sicard, with four other destroyer-minelayers, laid another minefield off Bougainville on 8 November 1943 and, after brief convoy duty, Sicard laid a third minefield off the Shortland Islands on 24 November 1943. Between December 1943 and April 1944, she escorted convoys between Espiritu Santo, Guadalcanal, Purvis Bay, Nouméa, Fiji, New Zealand, and Kwajalein. On 1 May 1944, she resumed her minelaying role and laid a minefield off Buka Island in two trips on 2 and 10 May 1944. After additional convoy duty, she arrived at Alameda, California, on 11 July 1944 for overhaul.

Sicard completed repairs on 20 September 1944 and, after refresher training, departed for Pearl Harbor on 4 October 1944. Following another period of upkeep from 10 October to 16 November 1944, she commenced duty training submarines. She conducted daily exercises with submarines off Oahu until 9 January 1945, and then performed similar duties at Midway Atoll. While operating from Midway, she was reclassified a "miscellaneous auxiliary," AG-100, on 5 June 1945. Sicard completed her training duties at Midway on 2 September 1945, the day Japan surrendered, bringing World War II to an end.

== Decommissioning and disposal ==
Sicard arrived at the Philadelphia Navy Yard at League Island in Philadelphia, Pennsylvania, on 21 October 1945 for inactivation. She was decommissioned on 21 November 1945 and struck from the Navy list on 19 December 1945. She was sold for scrap on 22 June 1946 to Hugo Neu of New York City.

== Honors and awards ==
- Yangtze Service Medal
- Asiatic-Pacific Campaign Medal with two battle stars
- World War II Victory Medal

Sicard received the Yangtze Service Medal for operations on the Yangtze Patrol from 20 to 26 October 1926, from 2 March to 2 May 1927, from 9 to 10 June 1927, and from 4 July to 22 August 1927.

Sicard received two battle stars during World War II for the attack on Pearl Harbor on 7 December 1941 and for the landings and subsequent defense of the landing zone at Cape Torokina from 1 to 2 and from 7 to 8 November 1943 during the Battle of Bougainville.
