= George J. Sicard =

American attorney

George J. Sicard (February 24, 1838 - August 26, 1904) was an American attorney who was a law partner of Grover Cleveland.

== Early life ==
Sicard was born in New York City on February 24, 1838. He was the youngest son of prominent merchant Stephen Sicard (1795–1839) and Lydia Eliza (née Hunt) Sicard (1813–1888). Among his siblings were Stephen Sicard and Rear Admiral Montgomery Sicard. After the death of his father in 1839, his mother brought the family to Utica, New York, where her father, Montgomery Hunt, was the long-time cashier of the Bank of Utica.

His maternal uncle was Ward Hunt, Chief Judge of the New York Court of Appeals who was appointed Associate Justice of the Supreme Court of the United States by President Ulysses S. Grant.

Sicard prepared for college at the Utica Free Academy before entering Hamilton College, of which he was an 1859 graduate. In Syracuse, he studied law in the offices of Hunt & Waterman before he was admitted to the bar in 1861.

== Career ==
After being admitted to the bar, he opened a law office in Utica before moving to Buffalo, New York in 1868 as the Assistant U.S. District Attorney under District Attorney William Dorsheimer (the Lieutenant Governor of New York from 1875 to 1879). Sicard and Dorsheimer had a law practice together until 1872 after which he practice by himself for nine years.

In 1881, Sicard formed a law partnership with Grover Cleveland and Wilson S. Bissell known as Cleveland, Sicard & Bissell. They practiced together until Cleveland became governor in 1883 and a new partnership was formed with Bissell and Charles W. Goodyear known as Bissell, Sicard & Goodyear. They practiced together until 1887 when Goodyear left the practice of law to focus on his family's lumber and railroad interest. After which Sicard and Bissell formed Bissell, Sicard, Bissell & Carey (with junior partners, Herbert Porter Bissell, a cousin of Wilson Bissell, and Martin C. Carey) until 1893 when Bissell left to become Postmaster General in President Cleveland's cabinet. Sicard left the partnership in 1896, but continued maintained his own practice. (Note: Bissell & Carey later became Bissell, Carey & Cooke when Walter Platt Cooke joined. Another member was Lyman M. Bass, the son of Lyman K. Bass (Cleveland's former law partner), and the firm eventually became Kenefick, Cooke & Mitchell.)

== Personal life ==
In 1872 Sicard was married to Sara Esther Movius (1850–1907), a daughter of Julius Movius of Buffalo. Together, they were the parents of two sons and a daughter, including:

- Edward M. Sicard (1875–1908), a Yale graduate and attorney who was killed in a car accident.
- Josephine Sicard (b. 1877)
- George Hallam Sicard (b. 1885), who was a professor at Hamilton College.

Sicard died at his home, 196 North Street, Buffalo, New York on August 26, 1904.
