= Clarence Stewart Williams =

United States Navy admiral

Clarence S. Williams
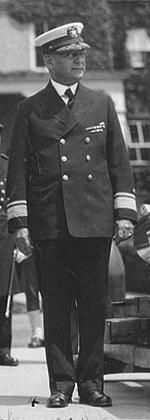
- As President of the Naval War College, circa 1923.
- Born: October 7, 1863; Springfield, Ohio, U.S.
- Died: October 24, 1951 (aged 88); Charlottesville, Virginia, U.S.
- Military career
- Allegiance: United States of America
- Branch: United States Navy
- Service years: 1884–1927
- Rank: Admiral
- Commands: USS Gwin; USS Rhode Island; Battleship Division 8, Atlantic Fleet; Light Cruiser Division 1, Pacific Fleet; Battleship Squadron 4, Pacific Fleet
- Conflicts: Spanish–American War; World War I
- Other work: Director of the Office of War Plans; President of the Naval War College

Clarence Stewart Williams (October 7, 1863 – October 24, 1951) was a four-star admiral in the United States Navy who served as commander-in-chief of the United States Asiatic Fleet from 1925 to 1927.

== Early career ==
Born in Springfield, Ohio, to Orson Williams and Pamela Floyd, he graduated from the United States Naval Academy in 1884 and was ordered to the sloop USS Hartford, flagship of the Pacific Squadron. He then served aboard the United States Coast and Geodetic Survey schooner USC&GS Eagre from 1886 to 1887, aboard the sloop-of-war USS Ossipee patrolling the Gulf of Saint Lawrence from 1887 to 1889, and as instructor in mathematics at the U.S. Naval Academy from 1889 to 1893. From 1893 to 1896, he served as watch officer aboard the protected cruiser USS Charleston, which protected American interests and shipping in South America during the Brazilian Revolution and evacuated missionaries from the coast of China during the Sino-Japanese War. He returned to the U.S. Naval Academy as an instructor of higher mathematics from 1896 to 1898.

During the Spanish–American War, he commanded the newly commissioned gunboat USS Gwin, which participated in the blockade of Cuba as a dispatch vessel. He was watch officer aboard the unprotected cruiser USS Marblehead from 1899 to 1900 and aboard the battleship USS Iowa from 1900 to 1901. He participated in a preliminary hydrographic survey of Midway Atoll in the Northwestern Hawaiian Islands for a cable station in 1901. From 1901 to 1903, he was an instructor of navigation at the U.S. Naval Academy, then served as executive officer of the hospital ship USS Solace, as executive officer of the monitor USS Monterey, and as navigator of the training ship USS Prairie during 1903 and 1904. He was executive officer of Iowa from 1904 to 1905, navigator of the battleship USS Massachusetts in 1905, and executive officer of Iowa again from 1905 to 1907. He was a member of the Board of Inspection and Survey from 1911 to 1912.

He commanded the battleship USS Rhode Island from 1912 to 1915, including operations during the Mexican Campaign of 1914. During World War I, he served as chief of staff of the Battleship Force, United States Atlantic Fleet; as commander of Battleship Division 8, U.S. Atlantic Fleet; and as commander of Light Cruiser Division 1, United States Pacific Fleet, on detached duty in the South Atlantic Ocean. He served briefly as chief of staff of the Naval War College early in 1919, but was transferred in June 1919 to command Battleship Squadron 4, U.S. Pacific Fleet.

After the war, he reported to the United States Department of the Navy to organize the Office of War Plans as its first director. He was President of the Naval War College from November 3, 1922, to September 5, 1925.

== Commander-in-Chief, U.S. Asiatic Fleet ==
On October 14, 1925, Williams relieved Admiral Thomas Washington as commander-in-chief of the United States Asiatic Fleet and was promoted to the temporary rank of admiral. As senior American officer in the Far East, Williams directed the American military intervention to protect foreign nationals in China at the beginning of the Chinese Civil War.

In 1926, the Kuomintang allied with the Chinese Communist Party to launch the Northern Expedition with the objective of unifying the country by suppressing local warlords and abrogating the unequal treaties imposed on China by the Western powers. Following the Nanking incident of 1927, in which Kuomintang troops targeted foreign properties and personnel, Western and Japanese warships and marines were dispatched to protect and evacuate foreign nationals living in cities on the Yangtze River. As Kuomintang forces approached Shanghai, home to a large international settlement, the American minister to China, John Van Antwerpt MacMurray, requested military intervention to protect their lives and interests. The United States Department of State directed Williams to protect lives by evacuating Americans from the interior but not to protect private property unless lives were endangered. American forces were authorized to cooperate with other foreign forces, but not to participate in joint military actions.

At the height of the crisis, 171 warships of various nations were anchored off Shanghai. The American force included four cruisers, four destroyers, an oiler, a transport, a minesweeper, and the 3rd Marine Brigade, commanded by Brigadier General Smedley D. Butler. Williams was the senior officer of the international armada, although the British had more ships. Once Shanghai was secured, Williams sent reinforcements to Tientsin with orders to defend Americans in that city; to protect the Tientsin-Peking railroad; and, if necessary, to rescue MacMurray and the American legation from Peking. The threat to foreign nationals gradually faded as the strong foreign military presence helped deter further violence targeted against foreigners, and as the uneasy alliance between the Kuomintang and the Communists disintegrated into the Chinese Civil War.

Williams was relieved as commander-in-chief of the Asiatic Fleet by Admiral Mark L. Bristol on September 9, 1927, and reverted to his permanent rank of rear admiral, retiring shortly thereafter.

== Personal life ==
Williams married the former Anne Miller on June 6, 1888, and had a son, Edgar M. Williams, who became a captain in the U.S. Navy.

Williams died in Charlottesville, Virginia. He is buried with his wife, son, and daughter-in-law in Arlington National Cemetery.

== Gallery ==
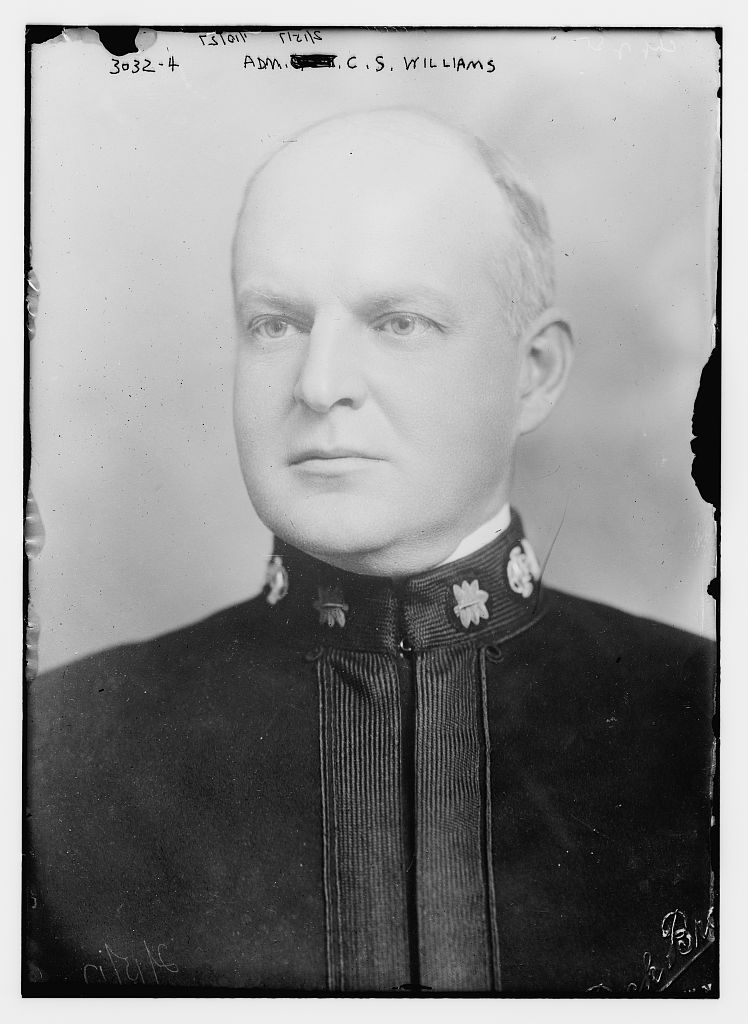
Williams circa 1915.

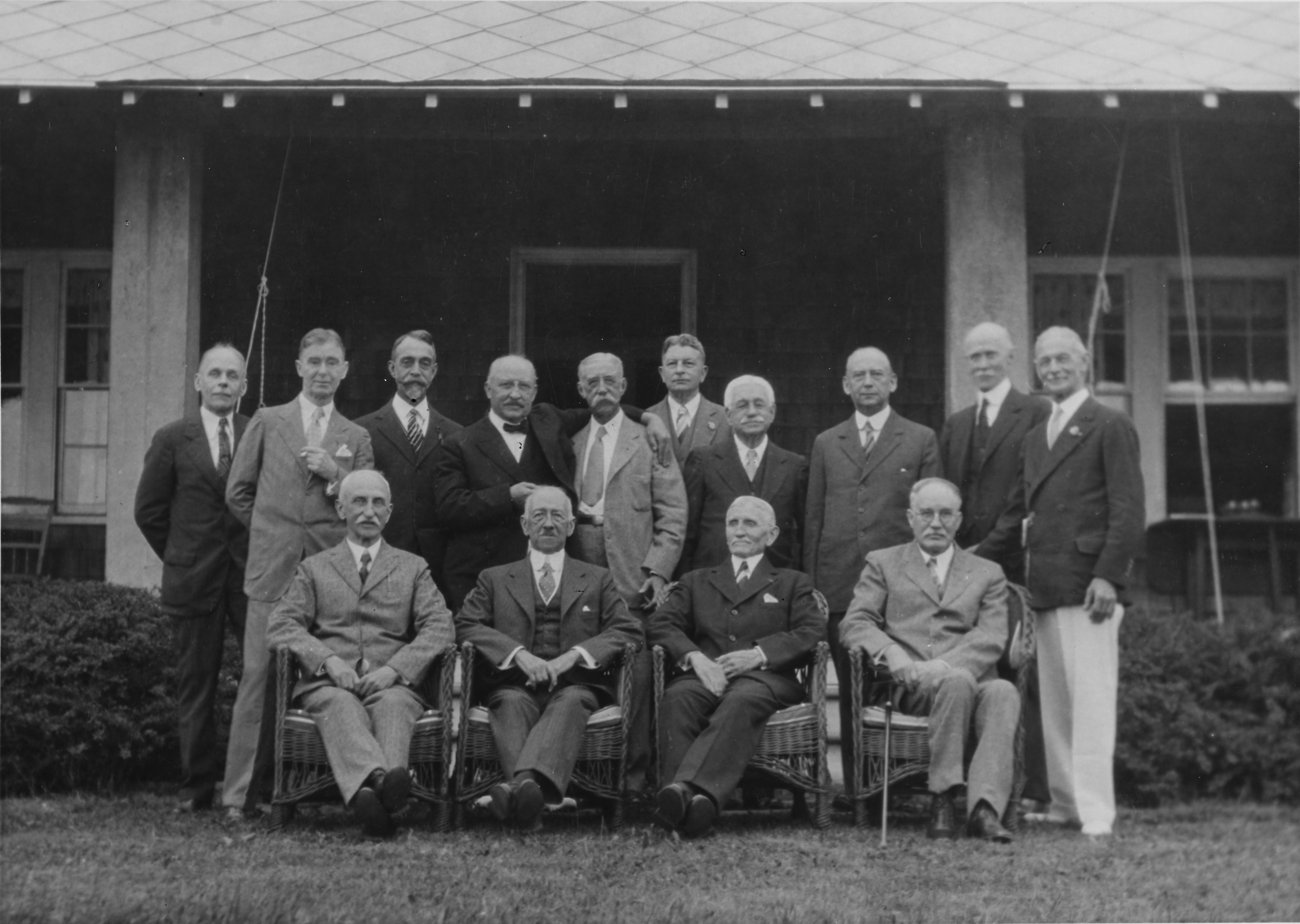
Williams is standing third from the right in this 7 August 1928 photograph of retired U.S. Navy rear admirals and other retirees at Rear Admiral Spencer S. Wood's home in Jamestown, Rhode Island.

Military offices
Preceded by William S. Sims	President of the Naval War College; November 3, 1922–September 5, 1925	Succeeded by William V. Pratt
Preceded by Thomas Washington	Commander in Chief, United States Asiatic Fleet; October 14, 1925 – September 9, 1927	Succeeded by Mark L. Bristol
