= USS Talbot (TB-15) =

Torpedo boat of the United States Navy

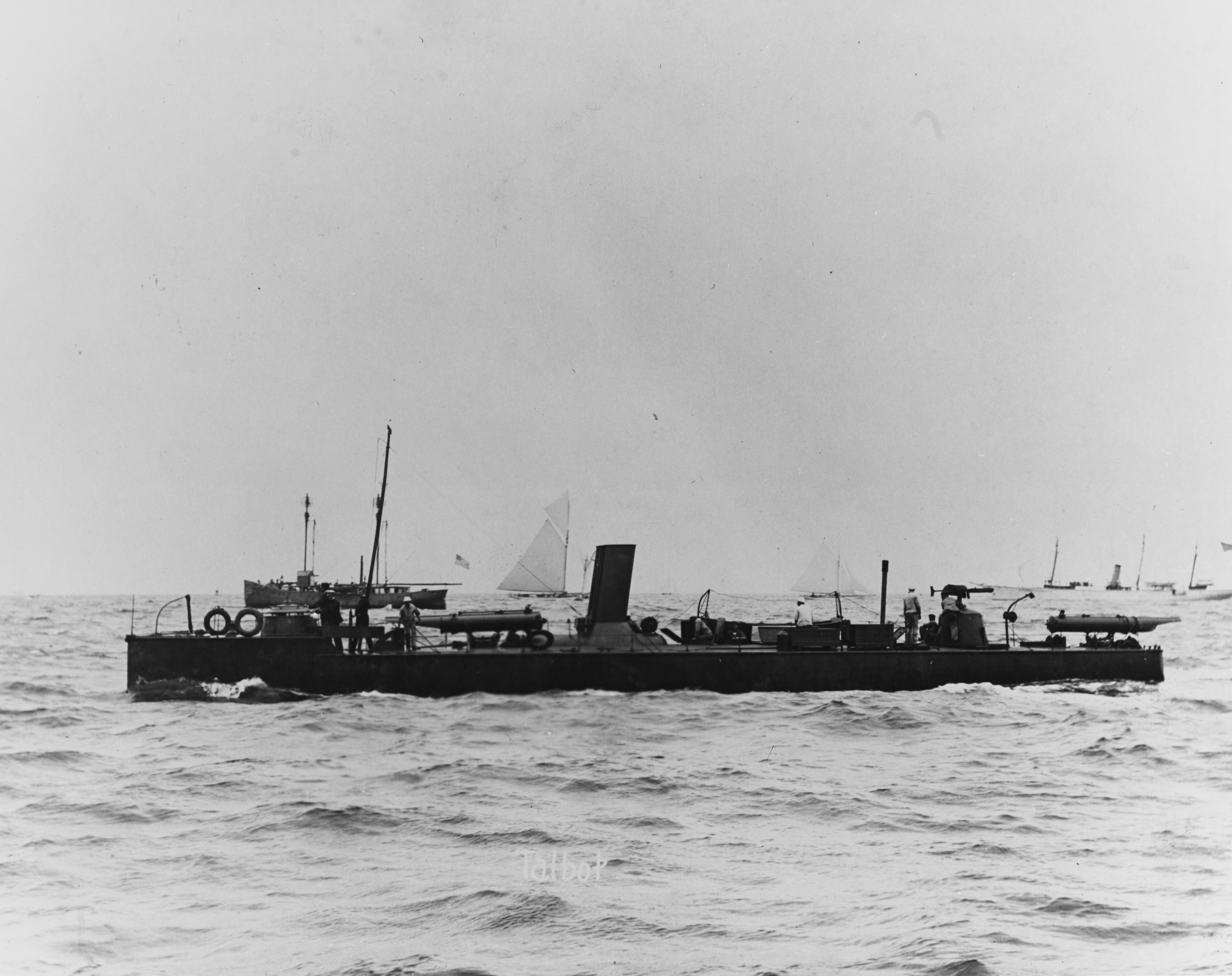
- USS Talbot (TB-15), underway, circa the early 1900s.

History

United States
- Name: Talbot
- Namesake: Lieutenant John G. Talbot
- Ordered: 10 June 1896 (authorised)
- Builder: Herreshoff Manufacturing Co., Bristol, RI
- Laid down: 8 April 1897
- Launched: 14 November 1897
- Commissioned: 4 April 1898
- Decommissioned: 18 June 1940
- Renamed: Berceau, 11 April 1918
- Reclassified: as YFB-3, 17 July 1920
- Stricken: 18 July 1944
- Identification: TB-15; Hull symbol:YFB-3
- Fate: Sold for scrap, 18 July 1944

General characteristics
- Class & type: Talbot-class torpedo boat
- Displacement: 46 long tons (47 t)
- Length: 99 ft 6 in (30.33 m)
- Beam: 12 ft 6 in (3.81 m)
- Draft: 3 ft 3 in (0.99 m) (mean)
- Installed power: 1 × Normand boiler; 850 ihp (630 kW)
- Propulsion: vertical triple expansion engine; 1 × screw propellers
- Speed: 21.5 knots (39.8 km/h; 24.7 mph); 21.15 kn (24.34 mph; 39.17 km/h) (Speed on Trial)
- Complement: 16 officers and enlisted
- Armament: 1 × 1-pounder (37 mm (1.46 in)) guns; 1 × 18 inch (450 mm) torpedo tubes

The first USS Talbot (Torpedo Boat No. 15/TB-15/YFB-3) was a torpedo boat in the United States Navy. She was the lead vessel in a two-boat class along with USS Gwin, which was launched a day later.

== Namesake ==
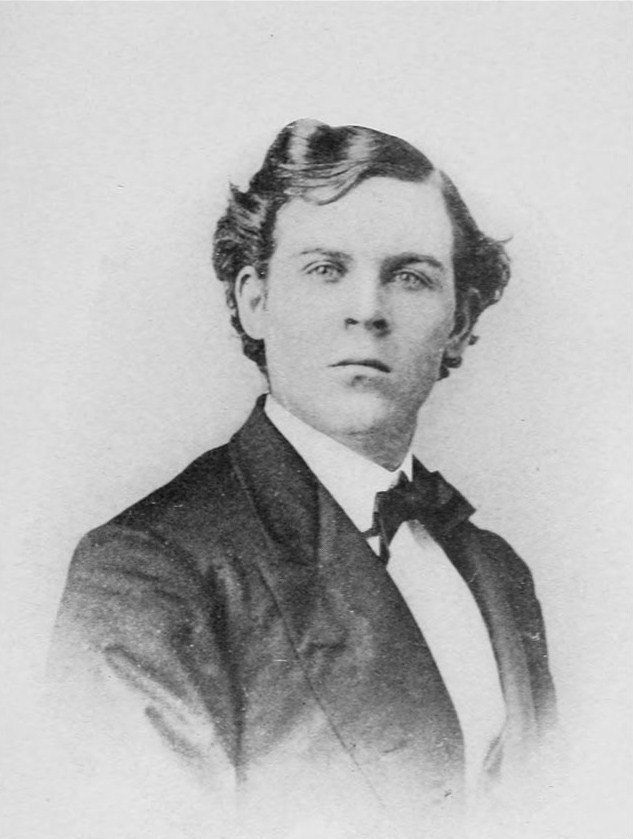
John G. Talbot

John Gunnell Talbot was born on 16 August 1844 at Danville, Kentucky. He was appointed a midshipman in 1862 and graduated from the United States Naval Academy on 12 June 1866. Commissioned Ensign on 12 March 1868, he attained the rank of master on 26 March 1869 and Lieutenant on 21 March 1870. He was serving as executive officer of USS Saginaw when that steamer grounded on a reef off Ocean Island in the mid-Pacific on 29 October 1870 and broke up. Talbot and four men volunteered to go to Honolulu, the nearest port, 1,500 miles (2,400 km) away, for help.

The men began the voyage in an open boat on 18 November and reached Kauai, Hawaii, on 19 December. However, as the party attempted to get through the heavy surf to shore, their boat capsized. Talbot and three others drowned while attempting to swim through the rough breakers to shore. The lone survivor, William Halford, reported the wreck of Saginaw, and her crew was saved.

== Construction and commissioning ==
Talbot was laid down on 8 April 1897 at Bristol, Rhode Island, by the Herreshoff Manufacturing Co.; launched on 14 November 1897; and commissioned on 4 April 1898.

Talbot cruised down the coast, making calls in Maryland, Virginia, and North Carolina before arriving at Havana, Cuba, on 2 August. She reported to the flagship and received mail for the blockading squadron. At 2100 hours that evening, while en route to Key West for coal, she sighted the dark hull of a ship off the port bow. Talbot signalled and stopped her engines, but was still rammed by the tug USS Uncas. The bow of the tug penetrated one foot into the torpedo boat's coal bunker, bending in two frames and crushing the side plating to below the water line. The tug towed Talbot to Piedras Cay where temporary repairs were made the next day to enable the damaged ship to proceed to Key West.

Talbot reached Key West on the 5th and got underway 10 days later for New York. She arrived at the New York Navy Yard on 6 September and was ready for sea again in early October. The torpedo boat was then assigned to the US Naval Academy for duty supporting midshipmen training, mooring at Annapolis on 10 October. On 11 June 1899, Talbot moved to Norfolk to participate in a one-year evaluation of experimental fuel oils. At the completion of this test program, she resumed her duties at the Naval Academy.

Talbot was decommissioned on 20 February 1904 and attached to the Reserve Torpedo Flotilla at Norfolk. She was recommissioned on 31 August 1906 and assigned to special duty between Norfolk and Annapolis. From early 1908 to September 1911, she served at the Torpedo Station, Newport, R.I. On 22 September 1911, Talbot was reassigned to Indian Head, Maryland, for service as a tender. Before assuming the new duty, she proceeded to Norfolk for her annual inspection and was found to be unfit for further naval use.

Talbot was inactivated on 1 May 1912 but retained, "in service," as a ferryboat to be operated between the Washington Navy Yard and the naval facilities at Indian Head. When she arrived at Washington, she was crewed by civilian sailors and made an average of three trips a week between the two points. Talbot was renamed Berceau on 11 April 1918 and reclassified a ferry boat. On 17 July 1920, she was designated YFB-3. She remained on ferry duty until 18 June 1940 when she was placed out of service and towed to Philadelphia.

Berceau was struck from the Navy list on 18 July 1944 and sold for scrap.
