= USS Gwin (TB-16) =

Torpedo boat of the United States Navy

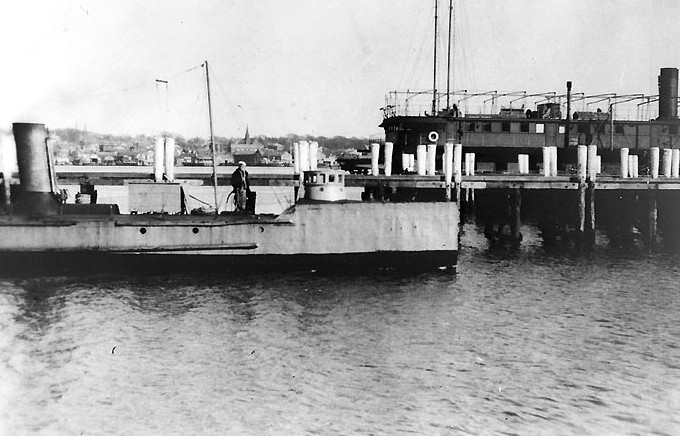
- Ferryboat USS Cyane (YFB-4), ex-USS Gwin (TB-16), in 1922

History

United States
- Name: Gwin
- Namesake: Lt. Commander William Gwin
- Ordered: 10 June 1896 (authorised)
- Builder: Herreshoff Manufacturing Co., Bristol, RI
- Laid down: 14 April 1897
- Launched: 15 November 1897
- Commissioned: 4 April 1898
- Decommissioned: 30 April 1925
- Renamed: Cyane, 11 April 1918
- Reclassified: YFB-4, 17 July 1920
- Stricken: 30 April 1925
- Identification: TB-16; Hull symbol:YFB-4
- Fate: Sold for scrap, 24 September 1925

General characteristics
- Class & type: Talbot-class torpedo boat
- Displacement: 46 long tons (47 t)
- Length: 100 ft (30 m)
- Beam: 12 ft 6 in (3.81 m)
- Draft: 3 ft 3 in (0.99 m) (mean)
- Installed power: 1 × Normand boiler; 850 ihp (630 kW)
- Propulsion: vertical triple expansion engine; 1 × screw propellers
- Speed: 20 knots (37 km/h; 23 mph); 20.88 kn (24.03 mph; 38.67 km/h) (Speed on Trial)
- Complement: 16 officers and enlisted
- Armament: 1 × 1-pounder (37 mm (1.46 in)) guns; 1 × 18 inch (450 mm) torpedo tubes

The first USS Gwin (Torpedo Boat No. 16/TB-16/YFB-4), was launched 15 November 1897 by the Herreshoff Manufacturing Co., Bristol, Rhode Island, and commissioned at Newport 4 April 1898, Lt, (j.g.) C. S. Williams in command.

She departed Newport 24 June, cruising down the eastern seaboard as far as Florida, thence on patrol off Cuba from 6 to 14 August 1898 as America went to war with Spain. She returned north to Annapolis 31 August and served as cadet training ship for the US Naval Academy until placed in reserve at Norfolk on 10 July 1903.

Gwin remained in reserve until June 1908 when she began assisting in experimental torpedo work out of Newport, Rhode Island. This duty terminated 18 April 1914 when Gwin decommissioned for use as a ferryboat. On 11 April 1918 her name was changed to Cyane, and she was re-classified YFB-4 on 17 July 1920. Her name was struck from the Navy Register 30 April 1925 and she was sold for scrapping 24 September 1925.
