= Kake War =

1869 conflict in Alaska

- Part of the American Indian Wars
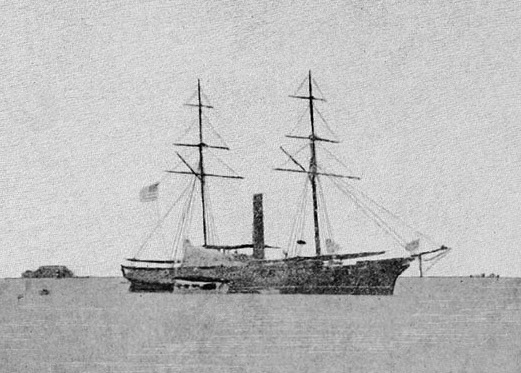
- Sloop-of-war USS Saginaw
Date	February, 1869
Location	Kake, Alaska 56°58′15″N 133°56′02″W
Result	Destruction of three Tlingit villages and two wooden forts

Belligerents
United States Army	Tlingit people

Commanders and leaders
Jefferson C. Davis; Richard Worsam Meade	Chief Tom

Units involved
USS Saginaw	Tlingit villagers

Strength
1 Sloop-of-war	three villages and two wooden forts

Casualties and losses
2 traders killed and 1 soldier injured	3 Tlingit killed and 5 wounded prior to conflict Possibly one killed in burning of villages An undetermined number of starvation deaths due to loss of winter suppliers
- Location within Alaska

The Kake War was the destruction in February, 1869, of three semi-permanent winter villages and two forts near present-day Kake, Alaska, by the USS Saginaw. Prior to the conflict, two white trappers were killed by the Kake in retribution for the death of two Kake departing Sitka village by canoe. Sitka was the site of a standoff between the Army and Tlingit due to the army demanding the surrender of chief Colchika who was involved in an altercation in Fort Sitka.

The loss of winter stores, canoes, and shelter led to several Kake deaths during the winter. The Kake did not rebuild the small villages destroyed. Some dispersed to other villages, while others remained in the vicinity of Kake, eventually rebuilding the present day Kake.

== Background ==
Following the Alaska Purchase, the United States Army came to Alaska to serve as the civil administering entity of the Department of Alaska. The U.S. authorities used common law, while the Tlingit people used indigenous law. Americans generally characterized the Tlingit legal framework as based on "revenge"; in actuality, it was more complex and involved "peace ceremonies" which included compensation in either goods or human lives.

== Events leading to war ==
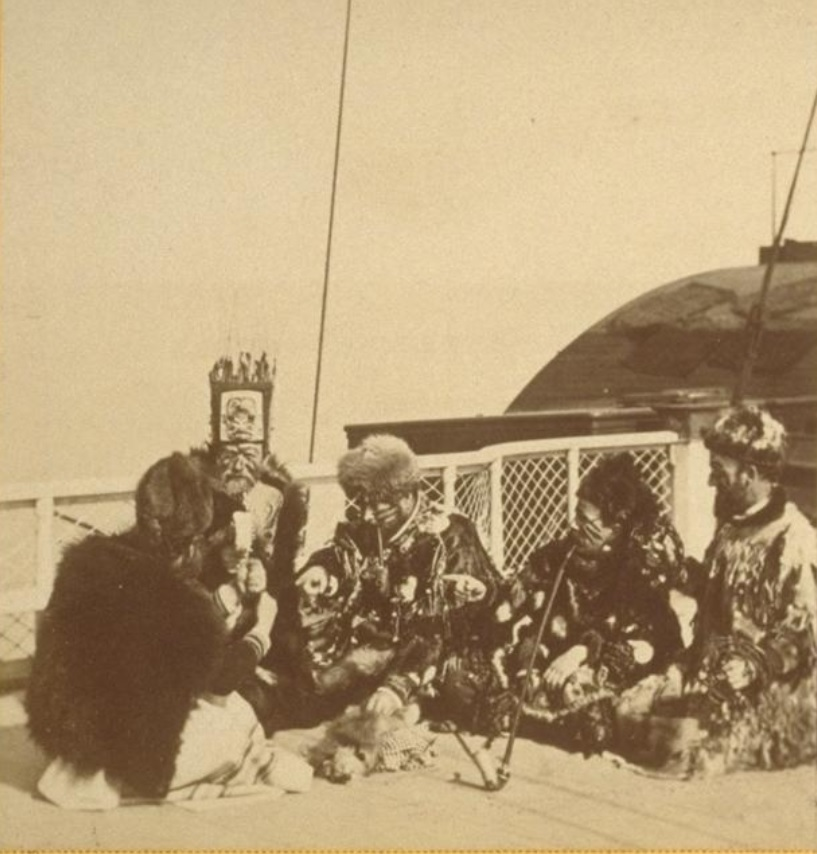
Sitka, Group of Distinguished Chiefs (1868)

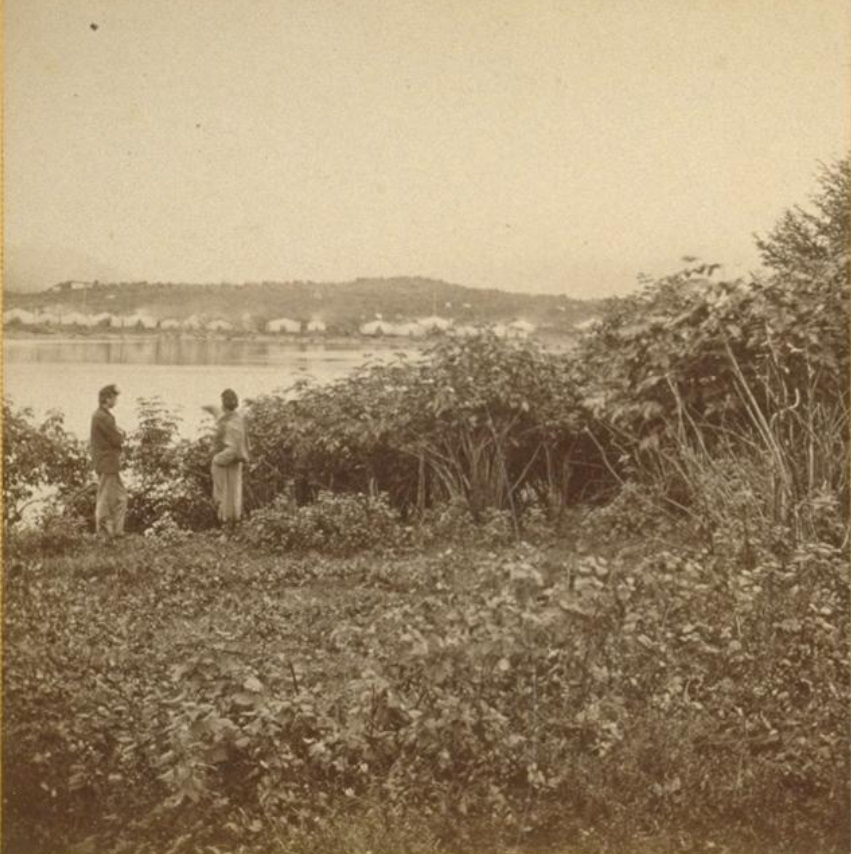
Sitka, Indian Village (1868)

On New Year's Day 1869, three Tlingit chiefs (Colchika, a Chilkat leader from Haines, Alaska, Kalsteix "Sitka Jack", and an unidentified chief) were invited to visit Fort Sitka to meet with Jefferson C. Davis. A sentry at the entrance to the fort challenged them, and after they ignored the challenge, kicked Colchika in the buttocks. In the ensuing scuffle, Colchika disarmed the soldier and walked away from the fort with his rifle. Upon hearing of the incident, Davis sent a small detachment to the nearby Sitka village to "bring in the Chilkat chief dead or alive". A firefight in the village ensued in which a Tlingit slave was killed, and Colchika and four others were wounded. The detachment then retreated as the Tlingit outnumbered them, and Davis proceeded to place Sitka under siege by gunship and fort artillery, demanding the surrender of Colchika. Some Tlingit who attempted to leave Sitka by canoe were killed by gunship fire. After a few days Colchika surrendered to the Army; however, the next morning an army sentry killed two unarmed Tlingit from the Kake tribe who were departing Sitka in a canoe.

A report by secretary of the Board of Indian Commissioners Vincent Colyer and Sitka Mayor William S. Dodge from 1870 attributes the initial altercation in part to serving alcohol to natives, saying Colchika was inebriated at the time with whiskey.

Chief Tom of the Kake tribe demanded compensation for the death, as is customary in Tlingit law, from General Davis, who refused. Failing to receive material compensation, the Kake sought retribution in lives. The Kake captured a party of four trappers on Admiralty Island: two white trappers (Ludwig Madger and William Walker) were put to death at Murder Cove, while two mixed race Tlingit-Russian guides were purposefully set free.

While the army failed to recognize Tlingit law, others recognized the local customs. According to the post trader at Sitka, Frank K. Louthan, "The failure to promptly pay for a real or supposed injury is at once the signal for retaliation, "The Kakes very promptly sought the usual remedy, 'an eye for an eye, a tooth for a tooth'".

== Destruction of villages and forts ==
Upon hearing of the retribution killings, Davis instructed Lieutenant Commander Richard Worsam Meade of the USS Saginaw to set sail to the Kake tribal lands, take a few chiefs as hostage until surrender of the accused responsible for the killing, and to burn the villages. The Saginaw departed on 11 February 1869.

A landing party from the Saginaw entered the small Fossil Bluffs Village, found it deserted, and the next day set it alight. The next day the Saginaw sailed for Hamilton Bay, the site of present-day Kake and at the time a large village named Town Where No One Sleeps. This site was bombarded prior to a landing party putting to shore and setting the village afire after finding it deserted. The next morning the Saginaw sailed for Security Bay to a village now known as Retaliation Point Village which was also deserted and put to the torch. Setting sail, the Saginaw found two deserted forts with stores and smokehouses which were also destroyed by fire.

According to Kake oral history, recorded in a 1979 interview, one elderly woman stayed in Fossil Bluffs Village and was burned to death.

== Aftermath ==
The loss of winter stores, canoes, and shelter led to several Kake deaths during the winter. The Kake did not rebuild the small villages destroyed. Some dispersed to other villages, while others remained in the vicinity of Kake, eventually rebuilding the present day Kake.

Trade with Fort Sitka was reduced substantially in the months following the conflict. The post trader at Sitka, Frank K. Louthan, some five months after the conflict delivered thirteen blankets and one coat, amounting in value to fifty dollar coins, to the Sitka and Chilkat, after the army refused to pay compensation, in order to restore trading relations.

In December, 1869, a similar event at Fort Wrangell in which Tlingit were killed and a white man (Leon Smith) was killed in retribution led to a two-day bombardment of Old Wrangell. However the Stikine surrendered the killer to the army, who following a court-martialing was hung in front of the fort garrison and villagers.

An unexploded Parrott rifle shell was discovered in the 1940s by a Kake resident embedded in a tree stump and kept as a family heirloom for many years before being defused in 2011 and placed on display in the Sealaska Heritage Institute.

== Apology ==
In 2024, the US Navy announced that there would be two apologies for wrongful military action, in Kake and in Angoon. Navy Environmental Public Affairs Specialist Julianne Leinenveber stated, “The pain and suffering inflicted upon the Tlingit people warrants this long overdue apology,” and “The Navy will be issuing this apology because it is the right thing to do, regardless of how much time has passed since these tragic events transpired.”
