= Edna Jackson (artist) =

American sculptor

Edna Davis Jackson (born 1950) is a Tlingit and American artist.

Jackson is a native of Petersburg, Alaska, and continues to live in the nearby community of Kake; she is the daughter of a Tlingit father, a fisherman and carpenter, and a mother from Michigan, and the family traveled between the two states during her childhood, which led to a feeling of resettlement each time they moved. She makes relief sculptures out of paper, combined with bark, grasses, and other natural material. Jackson began creating crafts with her mother as a child; much of her work is informed by an awareness of her Tlingit heritage. She received her bachelor of fine arts degree from Oregon State University in 1980, and in 1983 received a master of fine arts degree from the University of Washington. Papermaking has always been central to her art, and she taught the craft at the high school level and in undergraduate- and graduate-level classes at the University of Alaska at Juneau, where she also provided instruction in weaving. Her work is represented in numerous public and private collections, including that of the Heard Museum.

== See also ==
- Savannah Women of Vision
