= Kake, Alaska =

City in Alaska, U.S.

Kake, Alaska Ḵéex̱ʼ
- City
- Sign in Kake calling it 'The Town that Never Sleeps;' located at 57° north, it does not experience true polar night, with 17 hours of darkness at the winter solstice.

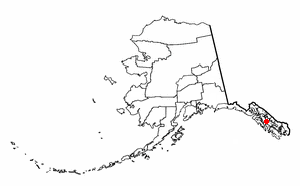
- Location in Alaska
- Coordinates: 56°58′15″N 133°56′02″W
- Country: United States
- State: Alaska
- Census Area: Prince of Wales–Hyder
- Incorporated: November 3, 1951

Government
  - Mayor: Lolanda Cavanaugh
  - State senator: Bert Stedman (R)
  - State rep.: Rebecca Himschoot (I)

Area
  - Total: 13.51 sq mi (34.98 km^{2})
  - Land: 7.67 sq mi (19.87 km^{2})
  - Water: 5.83 sq mi (15.11 km^{2})
- Elevation: 56 ft (17 m)

Population (2020)
  - Total: 543
  - Density: 70.8/sq mi (27.32/km^{2})
- Time zone: UTC-9 (Alaska (AKST))
  - Summer (DST): UTC-8 (AKDT)
- ZIP code: 99830
- Area code: 907
- FIPS code: 02-36770
- GNIS feature ID: 1422926, 2419403

Kake (/ˈkeɪk/, CAKE) is a first-class city in Prince of Wales–Hyder Census Area, Alaska, United States. As of the 2020 census, Kake had a population of 543. The name comes from the Tlingit word Ḵéix̱ʼ (Northern Tlingit) or Ḵéex̱ʼ (Southern Tlingit), which is derived from ḵée 'dawn, daylight' and x̱ʼé 'mouth', i.e. 'mouth of dawn' or 'opening of daylight'. Kake is the headquarters of the Organized Village of Kake, a federally recognized Tlingit tribe.

== Geography ==
Kake is located at 56°58′15″N 133°56′2″W (56.970841, -133.933751). Kake is on the northwest coast of Kupreanof Island in the Alexander Archipelago in southeastern Alaska.

According to the United States Census Bureau, the city has a total area of 14.2 square miles (37 km^{2}), of which, 8.2 square miles (21 km^{2}) of it is land and 6.0 square miles (16 km^{2}) of it (42.37%) is water.

== Demographics ==
Historical population
Census	Pop.	Note	%±
1880	261		—
1910	232		—
1920	387		66.8%
1930	386		−0.3%
1940	419		8.5%
1950	376		−10.3%
1960	455		21.0%
1970	448		−1.5%
1980	555		23.9%
1990	700		26.1%
2000	710		1.4%
2010	557		−21.5%
2020	543		−2.5%
U.S. Decennial Census

Kake first reported on the 1880 U.S. Census as the Tlingit village of Keex Kwaan (not to be confused with the present Klukwan). It formally reported as Kake beginning in 1910. It incorporated in 1951.

=== 2020 census ===
As of the 2020 census, Kake had a population of 543. The median age was 35.4 years. 28.5% of residents were under the age of 18 and 16.8% of residents were 65 years of age or older. For every 100 females there were 116.3 males, and for every 100 females age 18 and over there were 128.2 males age 18 and over.

0.0% of residents lived in urban areas, while 100.0% lived in rural areas.

There were 188 households in Kake, of which 43.6% had children under the age of 18 living in them. Of all households, 42.0% were married-couple households, 26.1% were households with a male householder and no spouse or partner present, and 20.2% were households with a female householder and no spouse or partner present. About 23.4% of all households were made up of individuals and 9.6% had someone living alone who was 65 years of age or older.

There were 222 housing units, of which 15.3% were vacant. The homeowner vacancy rate was 0.8% and the rental vacancy rate was 22.0%.

Racial composition as of the 2020 census
Race	Number	Percent
White	63	11.6%
Black or African American	2	0.4%
American Indian and Alaska Native	416	76.6%
Asian	3	0.6%
Native Hawaiian and Other Pacific Islander	2	0.4%
Some other race	3	0.6%
Two or more races	54	9.9%
Hispanic or Latino (of any race)	7	1.3%

=== 2000 census ===
As of the census of 2000, there were 710 people, 246 households, and 171 families residing in the city. The population density was 87.0 inhabitants per square mile (33.6/km^{2}). There were 288 housing units at an average density of 35.3 per square mile (13.6/km^{2}). The racial makeup of the city was 24.08% White, 0.28% Black or African American, 66.76% Native American, 0.28% Asian, 0.56% from other races, and 8.03% from two or more races. 1.55% of the population were Hispanic or Latino of any race.

There were 246 households, out of which 41.1% had children under the age of 18 living with them, 52.0% were married couples living together, 13.4% had a female householder with no husband present, and 30.1% were non-families. 24.8% of all households were made up of individuals, and 6.9% had someone living alone who was 65 years of age or older. The average household size was 2.88 and the average family size was 3.49.

In the city the population was spread out, with 33.8% under the age of 18, 6.8% from 18 to 24, 29.7% from 25 to 44, 22.7% from 45 to 64, and 7.0% who were 65 years of age or older. The median age was 32 years. For every 100 females, there were 113.2 males. For every 100 females age 18 and over, there were 112.7 males.

The median income for a household in the city was $39,643, and the median income for a family was $42,857. Males had a median income of $44,167 versus $20,625 for females. The per capita income for the city was $17,411. About 13.2% of families and 14.6% of the population were below the poverty line, including 23.7% of those under the age of 18 and 4.0% of those 65 and older.

== History ==
=== Prior to Alaska Purchase ===
The region of Kake has been inhabited by the Ḵéex̱ʼ Kwáan of Tlingit Indigenous people for thousands of years.

The Tlingit of the Kake region gained a reputation among early European and American explorers of being strong and powerful. Some conflicts with early explorers have been documented by historians. Some scholars believe the first explorer to enter Tlingit lands was the Briton Francis Drake, who traveled to the area near present-day Kake in 1579, although other scholars dispute this theory.

In the early 19th century, Kake was visited by American maritime fur traders seeking sea otter skins, such as the ship Atahualpa in 1805 and Otter in 1811. Kake was also visited by the Russian Golovin Expedition in 1818. Mikhail Tikhanov, an artist with the expedition, painted a watercolor of the Tlingit chief Kotlean.

=== After Alaska Purchase ===
In the February 1869 Kake War, the USS Saginaw destroyed three deserted villages and two forts near present-day Kake. Prior to the conflict, two white trappers were killed by the Kake in retribution for the death of two Kake departing Sitka. Sitka was the site of a standoff between the Army and some Tlingits who refused to surrender Chief Colchika, who was involved in an altercation in Fort Sitka. While no Kake died in the destruction of the villages, except perhaps for a single old woman, some died over the winter due to the loss of winter stores, canoes, and shelter led to the death. The villages were not rebuilt, and their inhabitants dispersed to other villages or remained in the vicinity, eventually rebuilding the present day Kake.

On September 25, 2024, the U.S. Navy formally apologized to the people of Kake for the destruction of the village.

Kake is the site of a 128-foot totem pole, one of the world's largest, carved in 1967 for the Alaska Purchase centennial.

== Government ==
A first-class city, Kake has a mayor-council form of government which is composed of a mayor and six council members. The city also has a city manager.

== Education ==
The Kake City School District operates the city's school.

== Notable people ==
- Edna Jackson (born 1950), artist

== See also ==
- List of cities in Alaska

== Bibliography ==
- Dombrowski, Kirk (2001) Against Culture: Development, Politics, and Religion in Indian Alaska. Lincoln: University of Nebraska Press.
