= USS Halford =

Fletcher-class destroyer

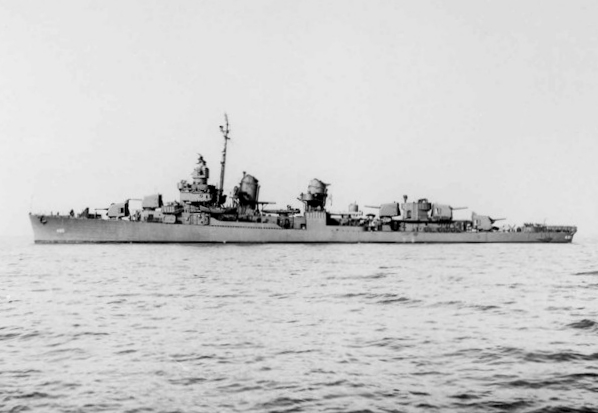
- USS Halford (DD-480) after removal of the catapult, 1943

History

United States
- Namesake: William Halford
- Builder: Puget Sound Naval Shipyard
- Laid down: 3 June 1941
- Launched: 29 October 1942
- Commissioned: 10 April 1943
- Decommissioned: 15 May 1946
- Stricken: 1 May 1968
- Fate: Sold for scrap, 2 April 1970

General characteristics
- Class & type: Fletcher-class destroyer
- Displacement: 2,050 tons (2,083 t)
- Length: 376 ft 6 in (114.7 m)
- Beam: 39 ft 8 in (12.1 m)
- Draft: 17 ft 9 in (5.4 m)
- Propulsion: 60,000 shp (45 MW); 2 propellers
- Speed: 35 knots (65 km/h; 40 mph)
- Range: 6500 nmi. (12,000 km) at 15 kt
- Complement: 273
- Armament: 1942: 4 × 5 in (127 mm)/38 cal. guns (4 × 1); 2 × Bofors 40 mm AA guns (1 × 2); 8 × Oerlikon 20 mm AA guns (8 × 1); 5 × 21 in (533 mm) torpedo tubes (1 × 5); 6 × depth charge projectors; 2 × depth charge tracks; 1944: 5 × 5 in (127 mm)/38 cal. guns (5 × 1); 6 × Bofors 40 mm AA guns (3 × 2); 11 × Oerlikon 20 mm AA guns (11 × 1); 10 × 21 in (533 mm) torpedo tubes (2 × 5); 6 × depth charge projectors; 2 × depth charge tracks
- Aircraft carried: 1, one catapult (removed 1943)

USS Halford (DD-480), a Fletcher-class destroyer, was a ship of the United States Navy named for Lieutenant William Halford (1841–1919), a recipient of the Medal of Honor.

Halford was laid down on 3 June 1941 at the Puget Sound Navy Yard, Bremerton, Washington; launched on 29 October 1942, sponsored by Miss Eunice Halford, daughter of Lieutenant Halford; and commissioned on 10 April 1943.

Halford was one of the three Fletcher-class destroyers to be completed (out of six planned) with a catapult for a float plane, the others being Pringle and Stevens. The catapult and an aircraft crane were located just aft of the number 2 smokestack, in place of the after torpedo tube mount, 5 inch mount number 3, and the 2nd deck of the after deck house which normally carried a twin 40 mm anti-aircraft gun on most ships of the class. (The twin 40 mm mount was moved to the fantail, just forward of the depth charge racks, where most ships of the class carried 20 mm mounts.) It was intended that the float plane be used for scouting for the destroyer flotilla which the ship was attached to. It would be launched by the catapult, land on the water next to the ship, and be recovered by the aircraft crane. It turned out to be not operationally suitable for the intended purpose, and the three ships were ultimately converted to the standard Fletcher-class configuration.

== 1943 ==
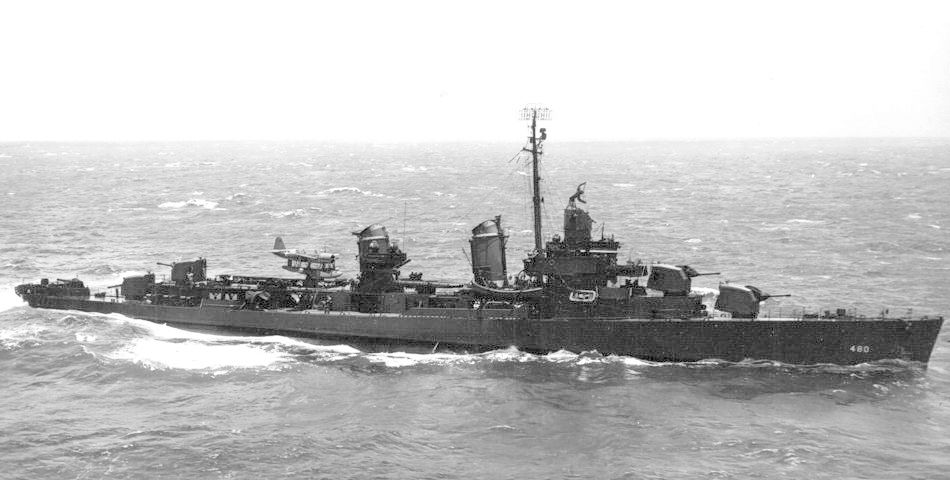
Halford with the catapult and an OS2U scout plane, July 1943.

In 1943 when the struggle in Pacific was raging, the Pacific Fleet prepared for its mighty sweep across Micronesia. In an effort to strengthen the "seeing eyes" of the fleet, Halford was constructed with a cruiser catapult and scout observation plane. She departed San Diego 5 July en route Pearl Harbor arriving five days later. For the next 3½ months Halford was to test the feasibility of carrying scout planes on small vessels. Because of tactical changes and the Navy's growing strength in aircraft carriers, Halford returned to Mare Island Naval Shipyard 27 October 1943 for alterations which replaced the catapult and scout plane with a second set of torpedo tubes and the number 3 5 inch mount.

By 6 December, with increased fighting power and a new profile, Halford again departed for the South Pacific. She called at Pearl Harbor, Funafuti, Espiritu Santo, and Tutuila, Samoa; then took up convoy duties which included a Christmastime assignment of protecting the troopship Lurline with Marine reinforcements embarked for Guadalcanal. Arriving at Guadalcanal, she assumed command of the anti-submarine screen and took up station off Lunga Point. In addition to Guadalcanal, Halford supported the beachhead at Bougainville, screening supply trains and participating in coastal bombardments.

== 1944 ==
During January 1944, the destroyers Halford, Waller, and Wadsworth operated as a three-ship task force, conducting anti-shipping sweeps along the eastern coast of New Ireland and engaging in counter-battery fire off the East Buka Passage. During the same month, the task force also destroyed Japanese military facilities on Choiseul Island.

Halford next became the flagship for Admiral T. S. "Ping" Wilkinson's Green Islands Attack Force. Carrying Major General Harold E. Barrowclough's 3rd New Zealand Division Admiral Wilkinson's destroyer-transport group sortied from Vella Lavella and the Treasuries, 12 – 13 February, arrived off Barahun Island at 06:20, 15 February and lowered their landing craft fully manned.

Halford took up station off Green Island and began patrolling while unloading operations proceeded. At 09:40 General Barrowclough, RNZA, and staff disembarked to land on Green Island. Within two hours after the initial landing, all New Zealand forces were ashore; 5,800 men were landed during D-Day, 15 February. The fact that such a force could put thousands of troops ashore virtually without opposition 115 miles (210 km) from Rabaul demonstrated the might and mobility of the Allied fleets in the Pacific.

Halford next joined a destroyer squadron to make shipping sweeps off the west coast of New Ireland. On the night of 24 – 25 February 1944, Halford and Bennett sank two small coastal ships and severely damaged a patrol vessel. For the next three days, Halford carried out her sweeps south of the strong Japanese naval base of Truk then returned to Purvis Bay for supplies.

The Spring of 1944 found Halford busily escorting supply units to the northern Solomon Islands. Halford then prepared for the longest cruise of her career—commencing early in June with the campaign for the Marianas.

The initial phase of Operation Forager which kept Halford at sea for seventy five days was the bombardment of Tinian's west coast defenses, followed by night harassing fire and the screening of heavy shore bombardment units. On 17 June Halford joined the battle line of Admiral Marc A. Mitscher's famed Task Force 58 (TF 58) for the greatest carrier action of all time: the Battle of the Philippine Sea. 19 June found Halford in the first phase of the battle:—the "Marianas Turkey Shoot"—as repeated enemy carrier strikes were shot down by surface fire. In the two day battle of the Philippine Sea, the Japanese Fleet lost 395 of its carrier planes, thirty one float planes, and three aircraft carriers.

While Guam footholds were being secured, Halford covered beach demolition units giving close bombardment support to assault troops and rescuing a number of friendly natives who had escaped through Japanese lines. Halford then joined the Angaur Fire Support Group in the bombardment of Angaur Island (4 – 21 September 1944).

Halford turned next to the campaign for the recapture of the Philippines. Joining Admiral Jesse B. Oldendorf's Fire Group of the Southern Attack Force, Halford participated in the pre-invasion bombardments in Leyte Island. Then, on 24 October, when Admiral Thomas C. Kinkaid estimated that Admiral Shoji Nishimura's Southern Force would try to enter Leyte Gulf via Surigao Strait, Halford prepared for the Battle of Surigao Strait (24 – 25 October 1944). That night and in the early morning hours of 25 October Halford, as a member of Destroyer Division 112, witnessed virtually the complete destruction of the Japanese Southern Force except for destroyer Shigure. American casualties totaled 39 men killed and 114 wounded, most of them in destroyer Albert W. Grant. Admiral Oldendorf said after the battle, "My theory was that of the old-time gambler: 'Never give a sucker a chance.' If my opponent is foolish enough to come at me with an inferior force, I'm certainly not going to give him an even break."

After the epochal Battle of Leyte Gulf, which broke the back of Japanese sea power, Halford departed Leyte Gulf 1 November 1944 and took up operations with the 3rd Fleet out of Ulithi until 2 December when she returned to Leyte as part of the covering force for the landings. On 6 December she was dispatched to escort damaged SS Antone Sautrain into Leyte, but the ship was lost in air attack. Returning to Leyte Halford next escorted supply echelons to Ormoc Bay and troopships to Mindoro.

== 1945 ==
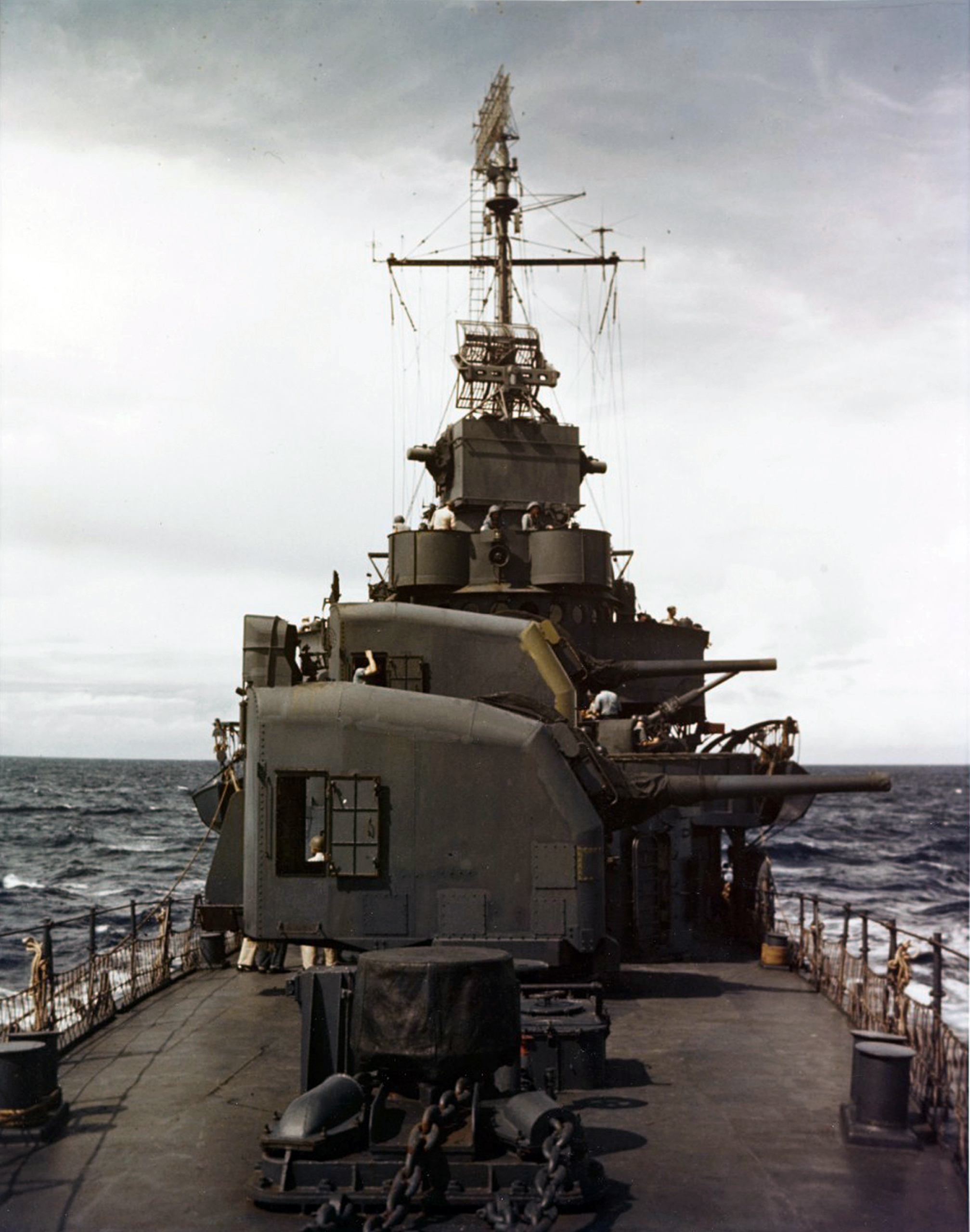
View of Halford´s forward gun turrets.

In the afternoon of 2 January 1945 Halford sortied from Hollandia to escort transports of Task Force 79 to Lingayen Gulf for the occupation of Luzon Island; delivering the transports safely despite heavy air attack she commenced patrolling the entrance to the Gulf. Then on the afternoon of 11 January, Halford took part in the shipping strike on San Fernando Harbor in which three small cargo ships, a landing craft, and several barges were sunk. Next morning she took part in the bombardment which neutralized the town of Rosario.

On 14 February, while patrolling Saipan Harbor, in a smoke screen, Halford rammed M.S. Terry E. Stephenson. Although there were no injuries, it necessitated Halford's return to Mare Island, where she arrived on 24 March 1945.

On 27 May 1945 Halford departed San Diego on her way west again. She proceeded to the Marshall Islands via Pearl Harbor where she escorted transports from Eniwetok to Ulithi. On 11 August Halford departed Eniwetok en route to Adak, Alaska as a unit of the Northern Pacific Fleet. With a task force composed of light carriers, cruisers, and destroyers, Halford departed Adak on 31 August and steamed into Ominato, Northern Honshū, Japan 12 September. Under the direction of Vice-Admiral Frank Jack Fletcher, this force was responsible for the initial occupation of the Ominato Naval Base and surrounding areas.

With Admiral Fletcher's Task Group, Halford cleared Ominato on 20 September returning to Adak five days later, thence on via Kodiak to Juneau for Navy Day.

== Fate ==
Halford departed Juneau, Alaska, on 1 November 1945, and arrived at Bremerton, Washington, three days later to begin inactivation overhaul. She departed Bremerton on 23 January 1946. She joined the Pacific Reserve Fleet at San Diego on 28 January and decommissioned there on 15 May 1946.

Halford was stricken from the Naval Vessel Register on 1 May 1968; she was sold on 2 April 1970 and broken up for scrap.

== Honors ==
Halford received thirteen battle stars for World War II service.
