= USS Uncas (AT-51) =

Tugboat of the United States Navy

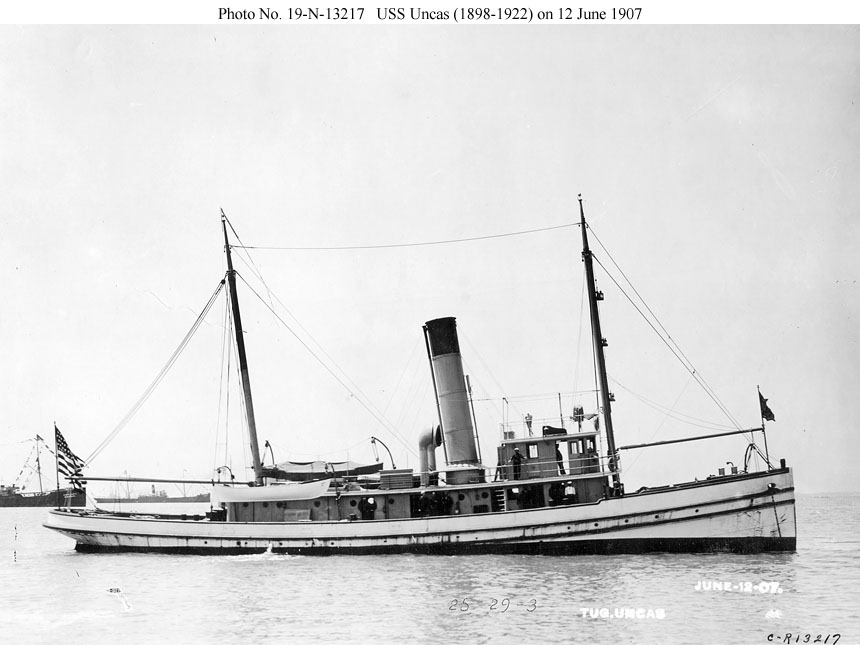
- USS Uncas (AT-51) anchored in Hampton Roads, VA., 12 June 1907.

History

United States
- Name: Uncas
- Namesake: Uncas (ca. 1588 – ca. 1683), a Mohegan chief
- Builder: John H. Dialogue and Sons, Camden, New Jersey
- Completed: 1893
- Acquired: 2 April 1898
- Commissioned: 6 April 1898
- Decommissioned: 6 March 1922
- Reclassified: Ocean Tug No. 51 by 1916; Fleet tug, AT-51, 17 July 1920; Yard tug, YT-110, 10 June 1921
- Stricken: 14 March 1922
- Identification: Hull symbol:AT-51; Hull symbol:YT-110
- Fate: Sold 25 July 1922; returned to commercial service
- Notes: In commercial service as SS Walter A. Luckenbach 1893-1898

General characteristics
- Type: Tug
- Displacement: 441 long tons (448 t)
- Length: 119 ft 8 in (36.47 m)
- Beam: 25 ft (7.6 m)
- Draft: 12 ft (3.7 m) (mean)
- Propulsion: Steam engine, one shaft
- Speed: 12 knots
- Complement: 15
- Armament: 1 × 1-pounder (37 mm (1.46 in)) guns; 1 × Gatling gun

The second USS Uncas (Ocean Tug No. 51/AT-51/YT-110) was a United States Navy tug in commission from 1898 to 1922.

== Construction, acquisition, and commissioning ==
Uncas was built as the commercial tug SS Walter A. Luckenbach by John H. Dialogue and Sons at Camden, New Jersey, for the Luckenbach and Company shipping firm of New York City. The U.S. Navy acquired Walter A. Luckenbach on 2 April 1898 for Spanish–American War service as an ocean-going tug and commissioned her as USS Uncas on 6 April 1898.

== Spanish–American War service, 1898 ==
Assigned to the North Atlantic Squadron, Uncas operated on blockade duty off Matanzas on the north coast of Cuba. On 3 May 1898, Uncas, in company with revenue cutter USS Hudson, captured off Havana the Cuba-bound Spanish sailing vessel Antonio Suarez. On 13 July 1898, again in company with Hudson, Uncas overtook two sloops. Together, Hudson and Uncas captured one sloop—Bella Yuiz, a Spanish vessel bound for Havana—and sank the other, taking two prisoners.

== Caribbean service, 1898–1915 ==
After the August 1898 conclusion of hostilities, Uncas underwent repairs at the Philadelphia Navy Yard at Philadelphia, Pennsylvania, before she sailed south for the Caribbean, via Port Royal, South Carolina.

In the autumn of 1899, Uncas inspected lighthouse facilities in the Danish West Indies and at Puerto Rico before she served a brief tour towing United States Army Quartermaster Corps barges. She then resumed lighthouse inspection and harbor survey duties in the Puerto Rican area and, during this tour, carried a selection board to Culebra Island to seek out a site for a target range.

Uncas then engaged in local operations in Puerto Rican waters. She assisted patrol yacht USS Mayflower off a shoal near San Juan, Puerto Rico, on 15 March 1901. She subsequently carried U.S. Army passengers and towed targets for U.S. Army Coast Artillery units at San Juan through mid-1901. Sandwiched in between her routine operations, she towed the disabled merchant ship SS Longfellow from Arecibo, Puerto Rico, to San Juan for repairs on 14 November 1901.

Assigned duty as a tender for the North Atlantic Fleet, Uncas continued her Caribbean-based operations, carrying dispatches, mail, and provisions and serving again on lighthouse inspection duties into 1902. She carried an inspection and surveying team to look over land on Culebra Island for a possible coaling station site from 26 June 1903 to 28 June 1903 before she headed north for temporary duty at the Norfolk Navy Yard at Portsmouth, Virginia.

Returning to the Caribbean soon thereafter, Uncas operated out of San Juan for the first half of 1904 before she returned to the Norfolk Navy Yard for repairs. She subsequently received assignment to Guantanamo Bay, Cuba, and operated out of that port on "special" and "general" service with the Fleet until she was assigned to the Norfolk Navy Yard in late 1915.

== Service in the United States, 1915–1922 ==
Uncas soon transferred from Norfolk to the Washington Navy Yard at Washington, D.C. While operating there, Uncas, by then designated Ocean Tug No. 51, was inspected and adjudged on 7 June 1916 to be no longer satisfactory for service off the coast. As a result, she conducted only local operations out of Washington through the end of World War I.

When the Navy adopted an alphanumeric hull number system for classifying its ships in mid-1920, Uncas was redesignated as fleet tug AT-51 on 17 July 1920. She was reclassified as a yard tug and redesignated YT-110 on 10 June 1921.

== Decommissioning and sale ==
Decommissioned at Washington on 6 March 1922, Uncas was struck from the Navy List on 14 March 1922 and put up for sale. Purchased by the Wood Towing Corporation of Norfolk, Virginia, on 25 July 1922. She then entered mercantile service and operated out of the Norfolk area.
