= William Halford =

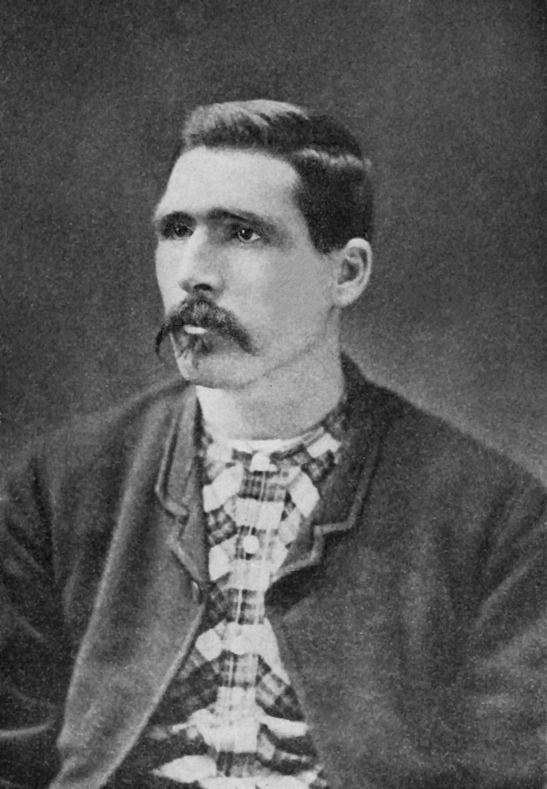
- Coxswain William Halford, circa 1870
- Born: August 18, 1841; Gloucestershire, England
- Died: February 7, 1919 (aged 77); Oakland, California
- Military career
- Allegiance: United States of America
- Branch: United States Navy
- Service years: 1869 – 1903; 1917 – 1919
- Rank: Lieutenant
- Units: USS Saginaw USS Benicia; USS Lackawanna; USS San Francisco USS Monterey
- Awards: Medal of Honor

William Halford (August 18, 1841 – February 7, 1919) was a sailor, and later an officer, in the United States Navy. He also received the Medal of Honor.

== Biography ==
Born in Gloucestershire, England, Halford enlisted in the United States Navy in 1869. He was serving on board USS Saginaw, when she ran aground near Kure Atoll on October 29, 1870. Halford was one of four sailors who volunteered to sail the ship's boat 1,500 miles to Honolulu for help, along with the ship's executive officer, Lieutenant John G. Talbot. After great suffering, and 31 days at sea, the party reached the island of Kauai on December 19, 1870. In attempting to land through the heavy surf, all but Halford were drowned, but he managed to reach shore and bring help to his shipmates. He received the Medal of Honor for his bravery.

Halford was promoted to the warrant officer rank of gunner on April 14, 1871, and to chief gunner on March 3, 1899. He served in the Navy until 18 August 1903 when, after reaching mandatory retirement age of 62, he retired after 34 years of active service.

When the United States entered the First World War, the Navy had a dire need for experienced officers like Halford. Military law at the time provided for retired officers, if placed on active duty during time of war, to be returned at the rank they would have achieved had they remained on active duty. Halford was recalled up to duty and promoted to lieutenant on July 1, 1918, despite being 77 years old. He was assigned to the Naval Training Station on Yerba Buena Island, and continued to serve until he died on February 7, 1919, at Oakland, California. Halford was buried at the Mare Island Navy Yard cemetery in Vallejo, California.

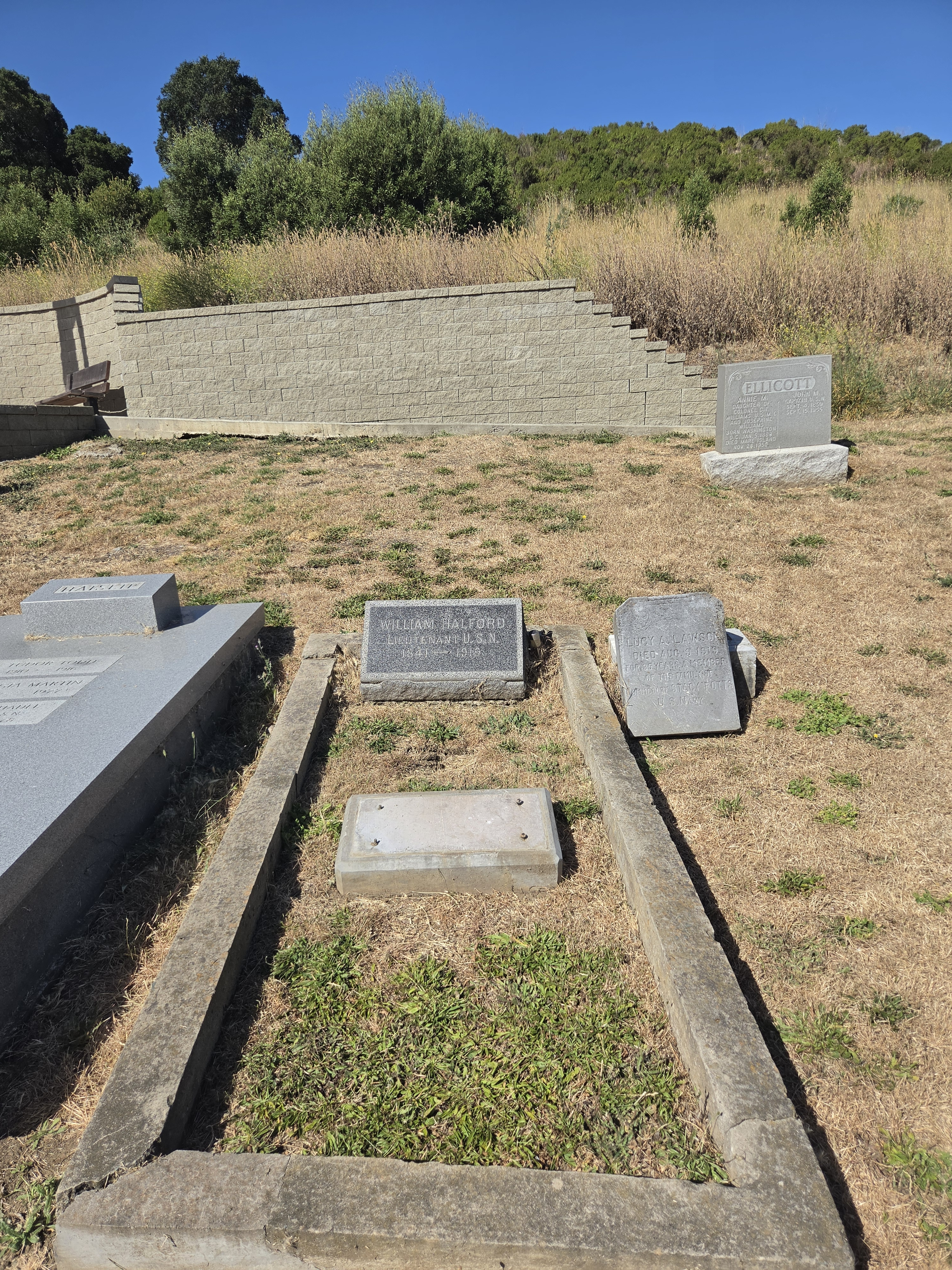
Gravesite of Lieutenant William Halford at Mare Island Naval Cemetery.

== Namesake ==
- USS Halford (DD-480) was named for Halford.

== Medal of Honor citation ==
Rank and organization: Coxswain, U.S. Navy. Born: 18 August 1841, Gloucester, England. Accredited to: California. G.O. No.: 169, 8 February 1872.

Citation:

Halford was sole survivor of the boat's crew sent to the Sandwich Islands for assistance after the wreck of the Saginaw, October 1870. Promoted to acting gunner.

== See also ==
- List of Medal of Honor recipients during Peacetime
