= Kake City School District =

School district in Alaska, United States

Address
- 175 Library Place Kake, Alaska, 99830; United States

District information
- Type: Public
- Grades: PreK–12
- NCES District ID: 0200360

Students and staff
- Students: 117 (2024–25)
- Teachers: 14.3 (on an FTE basis)
- Staff: 17.0 (FTE)
- Student–teacher ratio: 8.18

Other information
- Website: www.kakeschools.com

Kake City School District (KCSD) is a school district headquartered in Kake, Alaska.

It operates one school and the Shirly Jackson Community Library.
