= USS Saginaw (1859) =

American sidewheel sloop-of-war

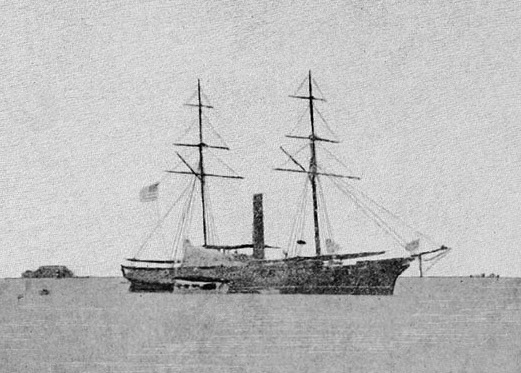
- USS Saginaw, probably at Mare Island Navy Yard in 1862.

History

United States
- Name: USS Saginaw
- Laid down: 16 September 1858
- Launched: 3 March 1859
- Commissioned: 5 January 1860
- Decommissioned: 3 January 1862
- Recommissioned: 23 March 1863
- Fate: Wrecked 29 October 1870

General characteristics
- Type: sloop-of-war
- Displacement: 453 long tons (460 t)
- Length: 155 ft (47 m)
- Draft: 4 ft 5 in (1.35 m)
- Complement: 50 officers and enlisted
- Armament: 1 × 50 pdr (23 kg) gun, 1 × 32 pdr (15 kg) gun, 2 × 24 pdr (11 kg) rifles

The first USS Saginaw was a sidewheel sloop-of-war in the United States Navy during the American Civil War. The ship was in operation throughout the 1860s, but in 1870 wrecked on what is now known as Kure Atoll, a Pacific island. The event produced several books and one of the surviving boats from the ship is in a museum.

The wreck of the USS Saginaw was found in 2003.

== History ==
The first vessel built by the Mare Island Navy Yard, Saginaw was laid down on 16 September 1858; launched as Toucey on 3 March 1859; sponsored by Miss Cunningham, daughter of the commandant of the Navy Yard; renamed Saginaw; and commissioned on 5 January 1860, Commander James F. Schenck in command.

The new side-wheel ship sailed from San Francisco Bay on 8 March 1860, headed for the western Pacific, and reached Shanghai, China on 12 May. She then served in the East India Squadron, for the most part cruising along the Chinese coast to protect American citizens and to suppress pirates. She visited Japan in November but soon returned to Chinese waters. On 30 June 1861, she silenced a battery at the entrance to Qui Nhon Bay, Cochin China, which had fired upon her while she was searching for the missing boat and crew of American bark Myrtle.

On 3 January 1862, Saginaw was decommissioned at Hong Kong and returned to Mare Island on 3 July for repairs.

Relaunched on 3 December 1862 and recommissioned on 23 March 1863, Saginaw was attached to the Pacific Squadron and operated along the United States West Coast to prevent Confederate activity. She visited Puget Sound in the spring of 1863 to investigate reports that Confederate privateers were being outfitted in British Columbia, but returned after learning that the scheme had no chance of success.

Her cruises in 1864 took Saginaw to ports in Mexico and Central America to protect the interests of the United States endangered by Confederate activity and by European interference in Mexico. During the closing months of the year, she escorted steamers of the Pacific Mail Steamship Company carrying rich cargoes of bullion from the California gold fields. In the spring of 1865, the ship was assigned to the United States Revenue Cutter Service but was returned to the Navy on 2 June 1865. She spent the remainder of 1865 protecting American citizens at Guaymas and other Mexican ports during the unrest and disorder which beset Mexico during the struggle between Emperor Maximilian I and Benito Juárez.

In March 1866, Saginaw returned to Mare Island. She sailed in August 1866 for Puget Sound to support settlers in the Pacific Northwest. While there, she aided the Western Union Company in laying a cable which brought the first telegraphic service to the region. After returning to Mare Island in December 1866, the ship remained at the navy yard through 1867.

In April 1868, a year after the United States purchased Alaska from Russia, Saginaw got underway for the Alaska Territory and, with the exception of a run home late in the year for replenishment, spent the next year exploring and charting the Alaskan coast. In the February 1869 Kake War the USS Saginaw destroyed three deserted villages and two forts near present-day Kake, Alaska. Prior to the conflict, two white trappers were killed by the Kake in retribution for the death of two Kake departing Sitka village in canoe. Sitka was the site of a standoff between the Army and Tlingit due to the army demanding the surrender of chief Colchika who was involved in an altercation in Fort Sitka. While no Kake, or possibly a single old woman, died in the destruction of the villages, the loss of winter stores, canoes, and shelter led to the death during the winter of some of the Kake.

After steaming back to San Francisco Bay in April 1869, Saginaw departed her home port on 28 July 1869 and operated along the coast of Mexico until arriving back at Mare Island on 11 November 1869.

== Fate ==
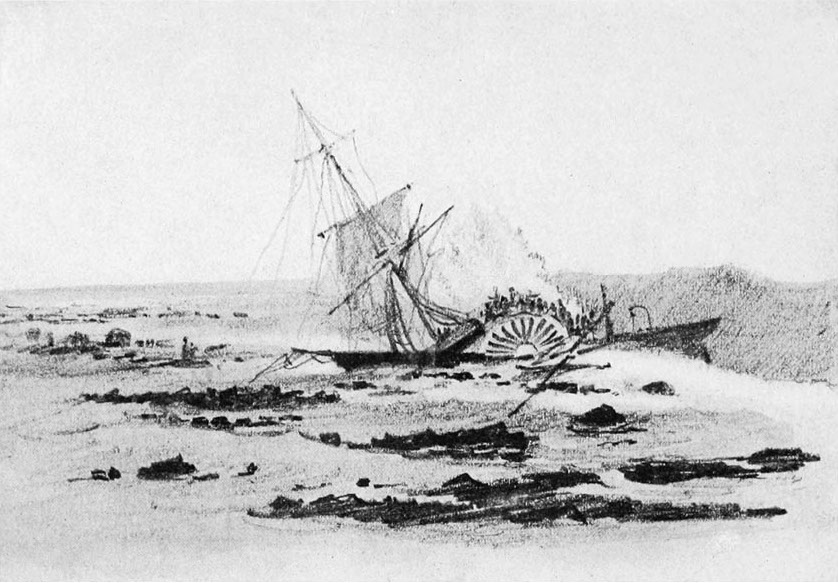
The Captain's depiction of Saginaw's fate

Cover of a book based on the ship's voyage, The Last Cruise of the Saginaw

Saginaw's next assignment took her to Midway Atoll to support dredging operations to deepen the entrance to the harbor. She reached Midway on 24 March 1870 and completed her task on 21 October 1870. A week later, she sailed for San Francisco, intending to touch at Kure Atoll (at that time known as Ocean Island) en route home to rescue any shipwrecked sailors who might be stranded there. The next day, 29 October 1870, as she neared this rarely visited atoll, Saginaw struck an outlying reef and grounded. Before the surf battered the ship to pieces, her 93 crew managed to transfer much of her gear and provisions to the atoll.

On 18 November, a party of five men, headed by Lieutenant John G. Talbot, the executive officer, set out for Honolulu in a small boat to get relief for their stranded shipmates. As they neared Kauai, 31 days and some 1,500 mi (2,400 km) later, their boat was upset by breakers. Only Coxswain William Halford survived to obtain help. He landed on Kauai, where Captain Dudoit of the schooner Wainona offered to take him straight to Honolulu leaving his return freight for a later trip. They sailed on Tuesday 20 December and arrived at Honolulu on Saturday 24 December and was taken to the United States Consulate there.

The US Consul authorised the despatch of a fast sailing coaster, the Kona Packet, which departed on Sunday 25 December, and the King of Hawaii, Kamehameha V, sent the inter-island steamer, Kilauea under Captain Thomas Long, to rescue the shipwrecked sailors. After loading with coal for 2 days and food and copious fresh water they departed on Monday 26 December. The Kilauea arrived at Kure on 4 January 1871, and the Kona Packet a day later. Due to uncertainty over the coal required for the return journey they steamed to Midway Island loading 40 tons of coal and left on 7 January, arriving back in Honolulu on 14 January, a round trip of 2350 miles. Captain Long was presented with a heavy gold-cased chronometer watch by the U.S. Government as thanks for successfully undertaking the rescue mission.

The Saginaw's gig survived being capsized in the breakers, and was sold at auction in January 1871. The purchaser presented it to the rescued crew of the Saginaw, whereupon it was transported back to San Francisco on the A.P. Jordan. Until 2015, it was displayed in the Curator Collection at the Castle Museum of Saginaw County History in Saginaw, Michigan. As of May 2021, the boat was stored off public display in the Naval History and Heritage Command (NHHC) Headquarters Artifact Collection.

The crew of the Saginaw may have been aware of the loss of the whaler Gledstanes on the same reef on 9 July 1837, as the crew of the Gledstanes faced the same predicament and constructed a schooner Deliverance from the wreckage of the Gledstanes over many months, whereupon Captain J.R. Brown with 8 men sailed for Hawaii on 15 Dec to secure a rescue ship which took the remaining men off the atoll in February. The wreck of Saginaw was discovered in 2003 and remains under the jurisdiction of the U.S. Naval History and Heritage Command.

The book A Civil War Gunboat in Pacific Waters: Life on Board USS Saginaw (by Hans Van Tilburg, University Press of Florida, 2010) covers the ship's construction, her ten years of service in the Pacific, and her loss at Kure Atoll. Van Tilburg led the team which discovered the wreck site in 2003.

The book The Wreck of the Saginaw (by Keith Robertson, The Viking Press, 1954, 144 pp) covers the voyage of the five sailors who sailed a small boat to Hawaii seeking rescue for the survivors remaining on Kure Atoll.

== See also ==
- List of sloops of war of the United States Navy
- Confederate States Navy
- Union Navy
