= Castle Hill (Sitka, Alaska) =

- American Flag-Raising Site
- U.S. National Register of Historic Places
- U.S. National Historic Landmark
- Alaska Heritage Resources Survey
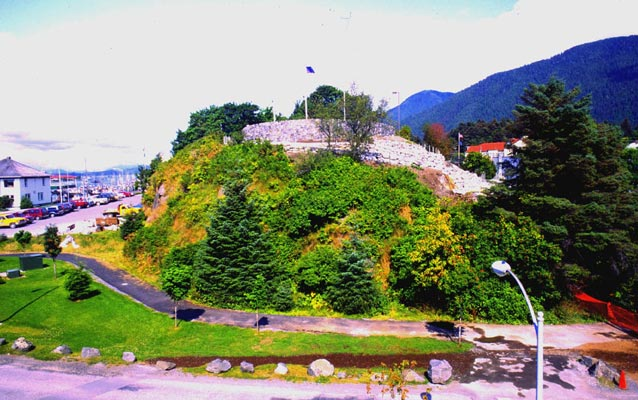

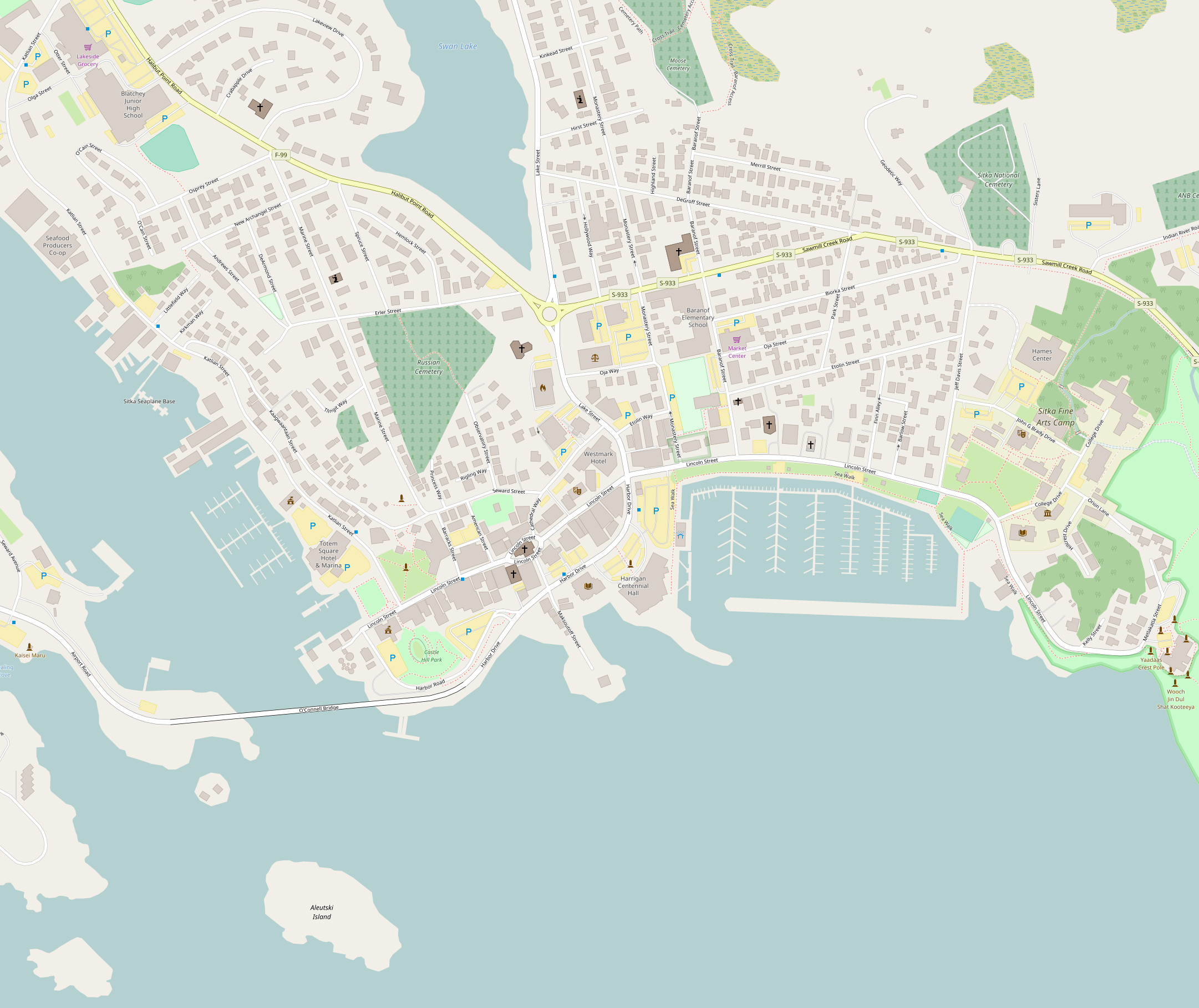
- Location within Downtown Sitka Location within Alaska
- Location: Between Harbor Road and Lincoln Street, Sitka, Alaska
- Coordinates: 57°02′55″N 135°20′16″W
- Area: 3.6 acres (1.5 ha)
- Built: 1804
- NRHP reference No.: 66000162
- AHRS No.: SIT-002

Significant dates
- Added to NRHP: October 15, 1966
- Designated NHL: June 13, 1962

Castle Hill (Tlingit: Noow Tlein, Russian: Замковый холм) also known as the American Flag-Raising Site and now as the Baranof Castle State Historic Site, is a National Historic Landmark and state park in Sitka, Alaska. The hill, providing a commanding view over the city, is the historical site of Tlingit and Russian forts and the location where Russian Alaska was formally handed over to the United States in 1867. It is also where the 49-star United States flag was first flown after Alaska became a state in 1959.

== Description ==
Castle Hill is a rock outcrop, about 60 feet (18 m) in height. It occupies a prominent position on the edge of Sitka Harbor, although it is now set back from the sea by several hundred feet due to fill added around its southern and western faces in 1968. The summit area is a generally flat area about 120 feet (37 m) in length and 90 feet (27 m) in width. The south face of the hill is sheer, while the eastern face presents a more gradual slope. An accessible trail, with interpretive panels, provides access to the now-bare summit area.

== History ==
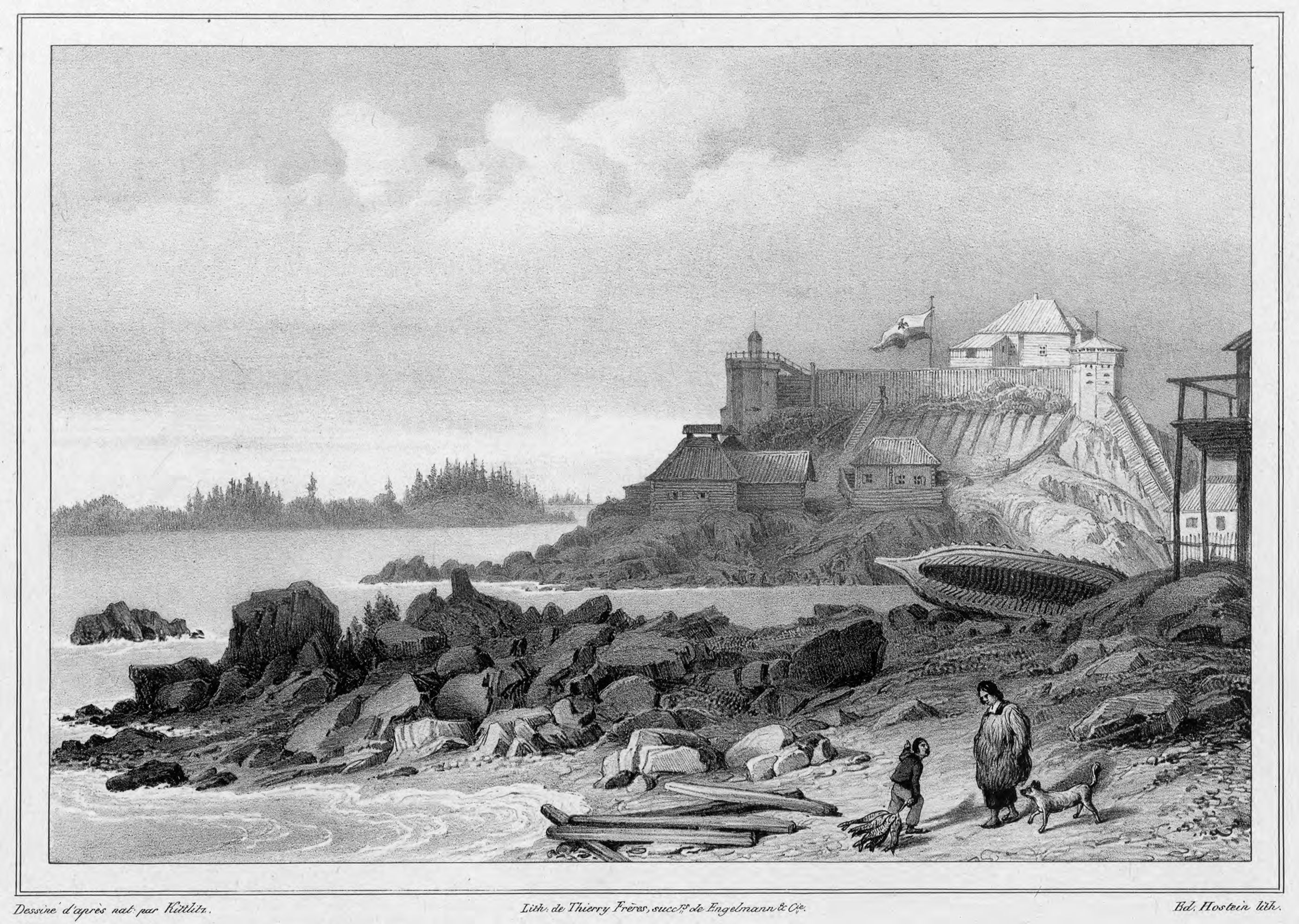
1827 illustration of Castle Hill in Russian-controlled Sitka. The hilltop building was an imposing fortification on a hill overlooking the water and Tlingit areas.

Prior to the arrival of Europeans in the area, Castle Hill was occupied by families of the Kiksadi clan of Tlingits. Alexander Baranov, a leading figure in the Russian-American Company, arrived in the Sitka area in 1795, and sought to establish a trading post on the hill. He ended up establishing Redoubt St. Archangel Michael several miles away in 1799; this trading post was destroyed by the Tlingit in 1802. Baranov returned to Sitka in force in 1804, seized Castle Hill, from which the outnumbered Tlingit had withdrawn. After the six-day Battle of Sitka, the Tlingit formally ceded Castle Hill to the Russians.

In 1806 the Russians transferred the headquarters of the Russian-American Company and the seat of government of Russian Alaska to Sitka, and Castle Hill was the focal point of the company and government facilities until 1867. They destroyed the Tlingit houses on the hill, and built a succession of structures on the hill's summit. The last of these, a two-story brick building with a cupola on top known as the Governor's House, was built in 1836 and was destroyed by fire in 1894.

In 1867, after the Alaska Purchase was negotiated, Russian Alaska was formally transferred to the United States in a ceremony held on Castle Hill. The Russian-built Governor's House was occupied by United States Army commanders until 1877, and remained a center of US government administration until the building burned. In 1898 the hill was transferred to the United States Department of Agriculture, which built a structure on the hill which served as its Alaska headquarters until 1932. This building was then used for a variety of commercial purposes before it was demolished in 1955. The site was then designated a territorial park.

When Alaska was admitted as the 49th U.S. state in 1959, Castle Hill was the location where the first 49-star U.S. flag in Alaska was raised, though the ceremony was unofficial and secret. The site was declared a National Historic Landmark in 1962 and was added to the National Register of Historic Places in 1966. In 1965 a stone parapet was constructed on the hill, and interpretive plaques were added to a display of six cannons and a flagpole. The property is now administered as part of the Alaska state park system.

== See also ==
- List of National Historic Landmarks in Alaska
- National Register of Historic Places listings in Sitka City and Borough, Alaska
