= History of the Tlingit =

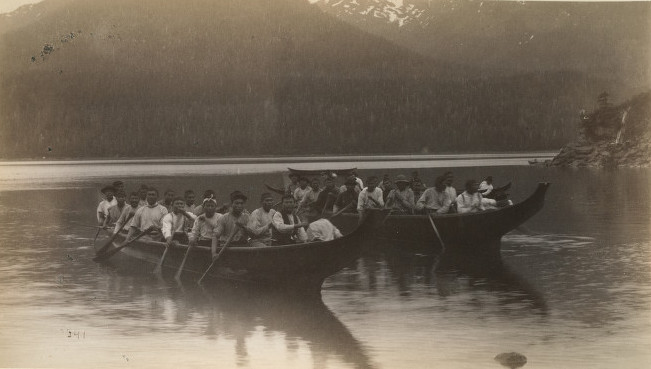
Tlingit canoes in Alaska, 1887

The history of the Tlingit includes pre- and post-contact events and stories. Tradition-based history involved creation stories, the Raven Cycle and other tangentially-related events during the mythic age when spirits transformed back and forth from animal to human and back, the migration story of arrival at Tlingit lands, and individual clan histories. More recent tales describe events near the time of the first contact with Europeans. European and American historical records come into play at that point; although modern Tlingit have access to those historical records, however, they maintain their own record of ancestors and events important to them against the background of a changing world.

== Raven Tales ==
Raven Tales are unique to Tlingit culture. Although the tales are associated with the Raven moiety, most are shared by any Tlingit regardless of clan affiliation and make up of the stories told to children. Raven Cycle stories are often shared anecdotally, the telling of one inspiring the telling of another. Many are humorous; some are serious, imparting Tlingit morality and ethics, and others belong to specific clans and may only be shared with permission. Some of the most popular are Pacific Northwest tribal creation myths.

The Raven Cycle stories have 1 Raven characters, although most storytellers do not clearly distinguish them. One character is the creator, Raven, who is sometimes identical to the Owner of Daylight. The other is the childish Raven: selfish, sly, conniving, and hungry. Comparing several stories reveals logical inconsistencies between the two, which is usually explained by their setting in a mythical place and time in which the rules of the modern world did not apply.

=== The Box of Daylight ===
The most familiar story of is The Box of Daylight, in which Raven steals the stars, the moon, and the sun from Naas-sháki Yéil (or Naas-sháki Shaan, the old man of the raven tribe at the head of the Nass River). The old man is wealthy, and owns three boxes which contain the stars, the moon, and the sun. Raven wants them for a variety of reasons (such as wanting to admire himself in the light or wanting light to find food easily), transforms himself into a hemlock needle and drops into the water cup belonging to the old man's daughter while she picks berries. She becomes pregnant with him, and gives birth; the old man dotes on his grandson. Raven cries constantly, until the old man gives him the box of stars to pacify him. Raven, playing with it, opens the lid; the stars escape through the chimney into the sky. He later begins crying for the box of the moon, and the old man gives it to him after blocking the chimney. Raven plays with it, rolls it out the door and it escapes into the sky. Raven finally begins crying for the box of the sun, and the old man gives it to him. Knowing that he cannot roll it out the door or toss it up the chimney (because he is being watched), he waits until everyone is asleep, changes into his bird form, grasps the sun in his beak and flies out the chimney. Raven shows the others his sun; when he opens the box the sun flies up into the sky, where it has been ever since.

== Tlingit migration ==
The Tlingit tell a story, with slight variations, of how they came to their lands. The story varies primarily in location, with some versions referring to specific rivers and glaciers; one describes the relationship with their inland Athabaskan-speaking neighbors.

Stories are considered property in Tlingit culture, and sharing a story without its owners' permission is a breach of Tlingit law. Stories about the Tlingit people as a whole, the creation myths and other universal records, however, are usually considered the property of the tribe and may be shared without restriction. It is important that the details be correct, to preserve the story's accuracy.

One version begins with the Athabaskan (Ghunanaa) people of interior Alaska and western Canada: a land of lakes and rivers, of birch and spruce forests, moose and caribou. Life in its continental climate was harsh, with bitterly cold winters and hot summers. One year the people had a poor harvest, and it was obvious that the winter would bring many deaths from starvation. The elders gathered and decided that a group of explorers would be sent to find a land rumored to be rich in food, a place where one did not have to hunt. Although the group was never heard from again, they became the Navajo and Apache nations.

Over the winter, many people died. The next summer's harvest was poor, again threatening the people, and the elders again decided to send explorers to find the land of abundance. This group traveled a long distance, climbing mountain passes to find a huge glacier. The glacier seemed impassable, and the mountains around it were much too steep for the people to cross. They could, however, see how the glacial meltwater flowed down into deep crevasses and disappeared under its icy bulk. The people decided that strong, young men should be sent to follow the river and see if it emerged on the other side of the mountains. Before the men left, however, an elderly couple volunteered to make the trip; the loss of strong young men would be devastating, they reasoned, but the couple were near the end of their lives. The people agreed that the elders should travel under the glacier. They made a simple dugout canoe, took it downriver under the glacier, and came out to see a rocky plain with deep forests and rich beaches. The people followed them under the glacier and came to Lingít Aaní: the rich, bountiful land which became the Tlingit home. These people were the first Tlingit.

Another theory of Tlingit migration is that they crossed the Beringia land bridge. The Tlingit, in general, are more aggressive than the Athapascan people of the interior. The Tlingit, the fiercest coastal nation (due to their northern location), began to dominate the interior as they traveled inland to forge trading alliances. Tlingit traders were middlemen who brought Russian goods inland over the Chilkoot Trail to the Yukon and northern British Columbia. As the Tlingit intermarried with the interior people, their culture became the norm.

== Clan histories ==
The main Tlingit moieties are yeil (raven), gooch (wolf) and ch'aak (eagle). Eagle and wolf are the same moiety. All clans fall under one of the moieties. Each clan has its own foundation history, which belongs to the clan and may not be shared. Each story describes the Tlingit world from a different perspective and, taken together, narrates much Tlingit history before the coming of the dléit khaa (white people).

A typical clan history involves an extraordinary event that brought a family (or group of families) together, separating them from other Tlingit. Some clans seem to be older than others, and their histories have mythic proportions. Younger clans generally have histories describing a separation from other groups due to internal conflict or the desire for new territory. Although the Deisheetaan clan descends from the Ghaanaxh.ádi, its foundation story tells little to nothing about that relationship. However, the Khák'w.wedí (who are descended from the Deisheetaan) usually mention their connection in their foundation story. Their separation was more recent (and well-remembered) than that of the Deisheetaan from the Ghaanaxh.ádi.

== European contact ==
A number of well-known and obscure Europeans explored Lingít Aaní and encountered the Tlingit. Most of the exchanges were peaceful, despite European fears to the contrary. The Tlingit quickly appreciated the trading potential of valuable European goods and resources, exploiting it in their early contacts.

Although early European explorers were generally impressed with Tlingit wealth, they felt the people had poor hygiene; most visited during the summer months, however, when the Tlingit lived in temporary camps. The few explorers who were forced to winter with the Tlingit noted the cleanliness of their homes and villages. Expeditions were:

- Bering and Chirikov (1741): Vitus Bering was separated from Aleksei Chirikov, and only reached Kayak Island; Chirikov, however, traveled to the western shores of the Alexander Archipelago. He lost two boats of men around Lisianski Strait, at the northern end of Chichagof Island. Chirikov then encountered hostile Tlingit, and returned west.
- First Bucareli Expedition (1774): Juan Josef Pérez Hernández was sent by Antonio María de Bucareli y Ursúa, Viceroy of New Spain, to explore to 60° north latitude in 1774 with Juan Crespí and Tomás de la Peña Suria (or Savaria). Suria made a number of drawings of Tlingit life in the pre-colonial period.
- Second Bucareli Expedition (1775): Bruno de Hezeta (or Heceta) commanded the expedition aboard the Santiago, with Juan Francisco de la Bodega y Quadra leading the Sonora as de Hezeta's second-in-command. Hezeta returned to Mexico shortly after a massacre by the Quinault near the Quinault River in present-day Washington state, but Bodega y Quadra insisted upon completing the mission to reach 60° north. He nearly reached Sitka, Alaska (59° north), claimed the lands he encountered for Spain, and named Mt. Edgecumbe Mount Jacinto. It is unclear if the expedition encountered the Tlingit.
- James Cook (1778): James Cook acquired the journals of Bodega y Quadra's second commander, Francisco Antonio Mourelle, and maps made from the first two Bucareli expeditions. This inspired him to explore the northwest coast of America on his third voyage in a search for the Northwest Passage.
- Third Bucareli Expedition (1779): Although Ignacia de Arteaga officially led the expedition on the Princesa, Bodega y Quadra (a more-experienced explorer) accompanied him aboard the Favorita. They made contact (and traded with) the Tlingit around Bucareli Bay (Puerto de Bucareli), and named Mount Saint Elias.
- Potap Zaikov
- La Pérouse (1786)
- George Dixon (1787)
- James Colnett (1788)
- Ismailov and Bocharov (1788)
- William Douglas (1788)
- Alessandro Malaspina (1791): Malaspina, for whom the Malaspina Glacier is named, explored the Alaskan coast as far north as Prince William Sound. His expedition contacted the Laxhaayík Khwáan of the Yakutat region when it reached Yakutat Bay.
- George Vancouver (1794)

== Fur-trade era ==
Russian settlement in Tlingit lands (1790s onwards) involved both peaceful trade and periodic violent clashes - notably the Battle of Sitka in 1804, the culmination of the Russian-Tlingit War of 1802-1805.

Chilkat Tlingit warriors attacked and burned Fort Selkirk, the Hudson's Bay Company post at the juncture of the Yukon and Pelly Rivers, in 1852. The Chilkat had been middlemen between the company and the Athapaskan people of the interior (on preexisting trade routes), and were unwilling to be excluded from the arrangement.

In 1855, an alliance of Tongass Tlingit (Stikines) and Haida raided Puget Sound on an enslavement expedition. Confronted at Port Gamble, Washington Territory by the USS Massachusetts and other naval vessels, the raiders suffered casualties, included a Haida chief. A return expedition by the alliance the following year was punitive, with Isaac N. Ebey chosen at random as a high-ranking white man whose death would avenge the chief's death the previous year. Although the territorial government pressed the colonial government of Vancouver Island to apprehend Ebey's killer, the colonial authorities lacked a sufficient military capability to mount an expedition capable of defeating the Haida-Tlingit alliance, and Ebey's killer was never identified or captured.

== American military rule ==
In March 1867, the United States purchased Alaska from Russia. The formal transfer of the Russian colony to the U.S. took place in October in Sitka. Called the Department of Alaska, the territory was assigned to the Army for occupation and government. Military rule by the Army and Navy, which lasted until 1884, was characterized by inconsistency, violence, and legal ambiguity. Historian Bobby Lain described Alaska at this time as "an insular colony, acquired before the United States was ready for overseas colonies."

The Tlingit were heavily impacted by American military rule. During the February 1869 Kake War, the USS Saginaw destroyed three deserted villages and two forts near present-day Kake. Before the conflict, two white trappers were killed by the Kake people in retribution for the death of two Kake who were leaving the village of Sitka by canoe. Sitka was the site of a standoff between the army and the Tlingit due to the army's demand for the surrender of a chief, the Chilkat Colchika from Haines, who was involved in an altercation at Fort Sitka. Although no Kake (or possibly one old woman) died in the destruction of the villages, the loss of winter stores, canoes and shelter led to Kake deaths during the winter. The Kake did not rebuild the small villages; some moved to other villages, and others remained near Kake.

The December 1869 Wrangell Bombardment began after Lowan, a Stikine, bit off the finger of a white woman; Lowan and another Stikine were then killed by soldiers. Lowan's father, Scutd-doo, entered the fort the following morning and fatally shot trading-post operator Leon Smith. The army demanded Scutd-doo's surrender and, after a bombardment, the villagers handed Scutd-doo over to the military. He was court-martialed and hanged before the garrison and villagers on 29 December; before his death, Scutd-doo said that he had avenged Lowan's death and did not target Smith.

The October 1882 Angoon Bombardment was the destruction of the Tlingit village of Angoon by U.S. naval forces commanded by Edgar C. Merriman and the USRC Thomas Corwin under the command of Michael A. Healy. The Tlingit villagers had taken white hostages and property and demanded two hundred blankets in compensation from the North West Trading Company after the accidental death of a Tlingit shaman who died in a harpoon-cannon accident while working on a whaling ship. Although the hostages were released when the naval expedition arrived in Angoon, Merriman demanded four hundred blankets in tribute; when the Tlingit delivered only eighty-one blankets, his forces destroyed the village. In 1973, the Indian Claims Commission awarded the Angoon clans $90,000 in compensation for clan property destroyed in 1882. The Angoon Tlingit continue to press for an apology from the navy. Governor of Alaska Jay Hammond commemorated the 100th anniversary of the bombardment as Tlingit Remembrance Day.

The American administration had recruited Tlingit to police the indigenous population by the 1880s, particularly in Sitka. Although some prominent Tlingit (such as Anaxóots) became police officers, their legal authority sometimes clashed with Tlingit norms of inter-clan conflict resolution.

== Early fishing industry ==
The first American industrial fish canneries were established in Tlingit territory in 1878 in Klawock (Lawáak) and Sitka. Some Tlingit sold fish to the canneries or worked processing fish. That summer, Tlingit led by Anaxóots of the Kaagwaantaan protested the arrival of eighteen Chinese workers in Sitka and demanded that they not take their jobs. The American managers reportedly resolved the conflict with promises that the Chinese would only use skills in the cannery which the Tlingit had not been taught; if the Tlingit learned those skills, they would replace the Chinese.

== Alaska Native Brotherhood and recognition ==
Two Tlingit brothers founded the Alaska Native Brotherhood in 1912 in Sitka to pursue the privileges enjoyed by whites in the area at the time; the Alaska Native Sisterhood followed. The ANB and ANS are nonprofit organizations which assist in societal development, preservation of native culture, and equality.

Elizabeth Peratrovich was an ANS member for whom Alaska designated a state holiday (February 16) in 1988. Peratrovich's brother-in-law, Frank (president of the Native Brotherhood), was of Tlingit and Serbian descent. Serbian and Montenegrin immigrants intermarried with the Tlingit during the 19th century due to their common religion, and St. Nicholas Russian Orthodox Church in Juneau was built by a group of Orthodox Tlingit and Serbs.

== World War II ==
During World War II, Tlingit individuals served as vital "Code Talkers," utilizing the spoken Tlingit language to transmit secret military messages that the Japanese could not break. Five Tlingit code talkers used their native tongue, a language previously suppressed by assimilation efforts, to develop an unbreakable code for the U.S. military. These men's vital contributions remained largely unknown for decades, as the military kept the codes secret and the veterans themselves were ordered not to speak of their service. .

== Alaska Native Claims Settlement Act and present day ==
The Tlingit were a driving force behind the Alaska Native Claims Settlement Act (ANCSA), which was signed by President Richard Nixon on December 18, 1971. Some interior Tlingit live in Atlin, British Columbia, and the Yukon communities of Whitehorse, Carcross and Teslin. Coastal Tlingit also live in Alaska. Every two years, the inland and coastal Tlingit celebrate their culture; Juneau hosts the celebration in even-numbered years, and Teslin is the host in odd-numbered years. Events include traditional performances, cultural demonstrations, nightly feasts held by the three inland Tlingit communities, hand-game tournaments, canoeing events, children's activities, an artists' market and food vendors.
