= Angoon bombardment =

1882 American attack on the Tlingit in Alaska

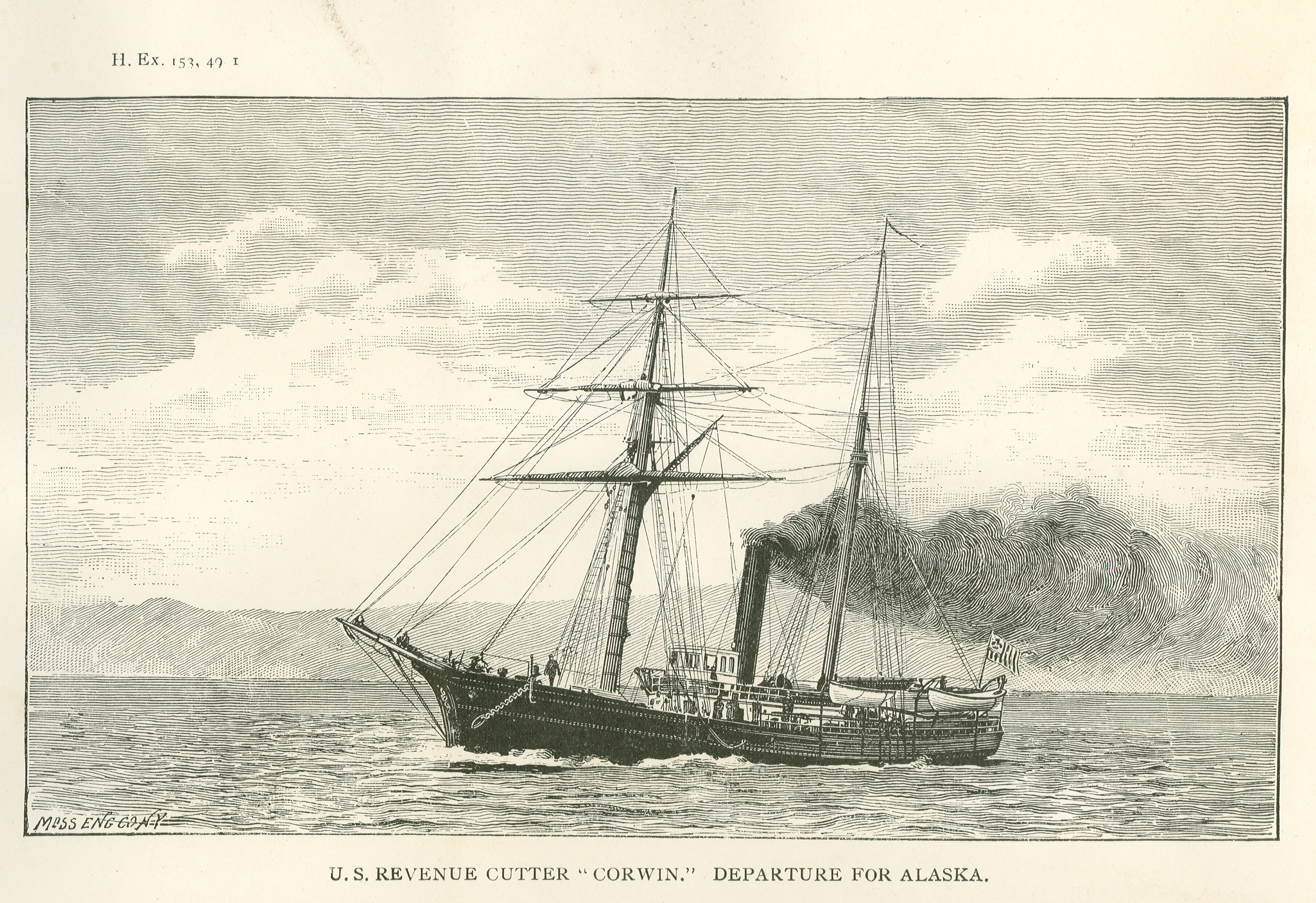
- USRC Thomas Corwin
Date	26 October 1882
Location	Angoon, Alaska 57°29′49″N 134°34′25″W
Result	Destruction of Angoon

Belligerents
United States Navy	Tlingit people

Commanders and leaders
Edgar C. Merriman; Michael A. Healy	

Units involved
USRC Thomas Corwin, detachment from USS Adams, marines.	Tlingit villagers

Strength
1 cutter, 1 tug, 1 howitzer, 1 Gatling gun, company of marines	one village

Casualties and losses
none	Six children killed in bombardment An undetermined number of starvation deaths due to loss of winter supplies
- Location within Alaska

The Angoon bombardment was the destruction of the Tlingit village of Angoon, Alaska, by US Naval forces under Commander Edgar C. Merriman and Michael A. Healy in October 1882.

A Tlingit shaman was accidentally killed while working on a whaling ship. Tlingit villagers demanded two hundred blankets in compensation from the North West Trading Company. The Tlingit allegedly took two hostages to secure the compensation, and the US Navy went to Angoon to rescue them. The hostages were released upon the arrival of the naval expedition. Commander Merriman demanded four hundred blankets from the Tlingit in tribute. When the Tlingit delivered just eighty-one blankets, Merriman's forces destroyed the village.

Public reaction to the bombardment was instrumental to the passage of the First Organic Act of 1884 which transferred Alaska from military to civilian control. The Navy apologized for its actions in 2024.

== Background ==
Following the Alaska Purchase, the United States Army came to Alaska to serve as the civil administering entity of the Department of Alaska. Administration of the department was transferred to the United States Navy in 1879. The U.S. authorities used common law, while the Tlingit people used indigenous law. Americans generally characterized the Tlingit legal framework as based on "revenge"; in actuality it was more complex and involved "peace ceremonies" which included compensation in either goods or human lives.

In 1869, two major conflicts took place between the army and Tlingit groups following retribution killings by the Tlingit against whites:

1. In the February 1869 Kake War, three deserted villages and two forts were destroyed near present-day Kake, Alaska by the sloop-of-war USS Saginaw. Prior to the conflict, two white trappers were killed by the Kake in retribution for the death of two Kake departing Sitka village in a canoe. Sitka was the site of a standoff between the Army and Tlingit due to the army demanding the surrender of chief Colchika who was involved in an altercation in Fort Sitka.
2. In the December 1869 Wrangell Bombardment the Stikine village of Old Wrangell was bombarded by the United States Army. The army issued an ultimatum to the villagers, demanding they deliver a Stikine named Scutd-doo to justice following the retribution murder of Leon Smith by Scutd-doo. Scutd-doo's son, Lowan, had earlier been killed by soldiers following an altercation in which he bit off the finger of the wife of the quartermaster of Fort Wrangell. Following a two-day bombardment of the village and return musket fire by Stikine skirmishers, Scutd-doo was handed over to the army, court-martialed, and in the first application of the death penalty in Alaska under US rule, was hanged before the garrison and Stikine villagers.

In 1878, the North West Trading Company established a trading post and fish processing plant at Killisnoo, Alaska, near Angoon, Alaska.

== Events leading to the bombardment ==
On 22 October 1882, a harpoon gun exploded on the deck of a whaling ship operated by the Northwest Trading Company. Several crew members were injured, and a Tlingit shaman by the name of Til'tlein (Note: Stikine names vary widely between sources, when named this name is given as Til'tlein, Teel' Tlein, or Tith Klane) was killed. The day after his death J.M. Vanderbilt, superintendent of the company station at Killisnoo, reported to the navy station in Sitka. He stated Angoon natives had taken the Killisnoo facilities, including holding two white employees, and demanded a payment of 200 blankets in compensation for the death of Til'tlein.

== Disputed claims ==
In 1949 and 1950, anthropologist Frederica de Laguna collected the story of Billy Jones, an Angoon resident who was 13 at the time of the attack. According to his account, villagers did not have warning of the coming of the American ship, and every structure was destroyed. Angoon elders have stated that Jones's account should be the basis of the Angoon story. Tlingit oral tradition disputes that there were white hostages involved. In the '70s, the Tlingit and Haida Central Council hired anthropologist Philip Drucker to research the case. Drucker noted that in the official documents, despite the captive white men being the primary mission that brought the ships to Angoon, neither Merriman or Morris "even mentions what should have been the climax of the expedition's achievements, the rescue of the white captives, if there actually was such a rescue."

== Navy expedition ==
As the USS Adams was thought to be too large to navigate in the shallow waters of the bay, Merriman tendered the company tug Favorite and the USRC Thomas Corwin under the command of Michael A. Healy, upon which he placed a company of marines, a Gatling gun, and a howitzer.

Merriman's force arrived at Angoon on 25 October, and the Tlingit released the white hostages and captured property. Merriman demanded four hundred blankets from the Tlingit as a "punishment and guarantee of future good behavior" to be delivered by noon the next day. The villagers were only able to collect 81 blankets for the tribute payment. Jones's account and official documents agree that Merriman brought his ship to anchor outside the lagoon, and proceeded to shell the town. Under the cover of the bombardment, marines landed and proceeded to destroy the houses of the village, forty canoes, and food stores. Naval records state a few houses survived, Tlingit oral tradition holds that none did. While most of the inhabitants survived after fleeing the village, six children died of smoke inhalation.

== Aftermath ==
An unknown number of Tlingit died during the winter due to the loss of winter supplies and shelter.

In 1884, the First Organic Act placed Alaska under civilian control. In the debate leading up to the act, Representative James Budd of California referenced Commander Merriman's role, stating "The Indians did not comply with this pre-emptory order of this royal dictator. I understand that they did not have the blankets. The commander of this United States vessel was a law unto himself, and in the morning he, a United States officer, judge, jury and sheriff, fulfilled his threat and shelled the Indian village."

In 1973, the Indian Claims Commission awarded the Angoon clans $90,000 in compensation for clan property destroyed in 1882 value. Federal law limited the value of the compensation to the value of the physical damage done to the village without regard for inflation or interest. $90,000 in 1882 is equivalent to $444,667 in 1973 when the award was paid out. The village of Angoon accepted the settlement from the government as a tacit acknowledgment that the Navy was wrong to shell Angoon. Governor of Alaska Jay Hammond declared the 100th anniversary as "Tlingit Remembrance Day".

=== Apology ===
In 2024, the US Navy announced that there would be two apologies for wrongful military action, in Kake and in Angoon. Navy Environmental Public Affairs Specialist Julianne Leinenveber stated, “The pain and suffering inflicted upon the Tlingit people warrants this long overdue apology,” and “The Navy will be issuing this apology because it is the right thing to do, regardless of how much time has passed since these tragic events transpired.”

Rear Admiral Mark Sucato delivered the Navy's formal apology on October 26, 2024—the 142nd anniversary of the bombardment—at a ku.éex’ (potlach) ceremony in Angoon. This gathering marked the end of the Angoon community's period of mourning for the attack. The ceremony was attended by community members, Navy representatives, and US Senators Lisa Murkowski and Dan Sullivan, who had helped advocate for the apology.

== Beaver Canoe ==
The only canoe known to have survived the bombardment was away from the village at the time. The canoe was used extensively that winter for hunting, fishing, and gathering supplies. The canoe holds special importance, as many of the people who survived the ordeal would not have survived without it. When the canoe was no longer seaworthy, the vessel was ceremonially cremated, but the beaver carving from the prow was kept as a reminder. Sometime around 1911, the beaver carving was lost. In 2011, a Tlingit delegation visiting the American Museum of Natural History discovered the carving in the museum's collection, with very little documentation as to how it got there. After the beaver's rediscovery, it was repatriated to Angoon. The carving was present at the ku.éex’ for the Navy's apology in 2024.

== See also ==
- Wooshkeetaan Kootéeyaa – Totem pole in Juneau referencing the bombardment
