= Angoon Community Association =

Alaska Native tribe

Angoon Community Association Xootsnoowú Ḵwáan
- Alaska Native village
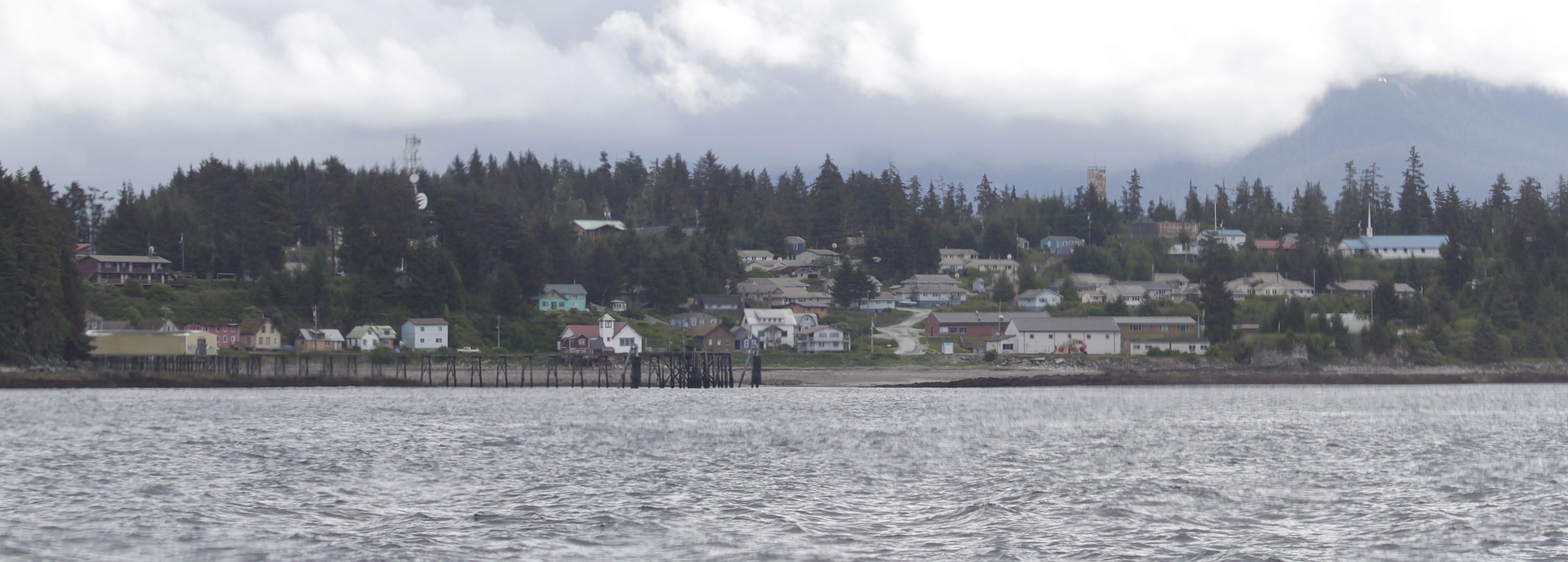
- Village of Angoon, Alaska

- Angoon Community Association headquarters
- Coordinates: 57°30′03″N 134°35′03″W
- Constitution Ratified: November 15, 1939; 86 years ago
- Capital: Angoon, Alaska

Government
  - Type: Representative democracy
  - Body: Angoon Tribal Council
  - President: Mary Jean Duncan

Population (2025)
  - Estimate: 250
- Demonym: Tlingit
- Time zone: UTC–09:00 (AKST)
  - Summer (DST): UTC–08:00 (AKDT)
- Website: www.facebook.com/1934Tribal

The Angoon Community Association is a federally recognized tribe in Alaska, United States. This Alaska Native tribe is headquartered in Angoon, Alaska. They are Tlingit.

The tribe belong to the Kootznoowoo Tlingit people (Tlingit: Xootsnoowú Ḵwáan). The name Kootznoowoo translates as "fortress of brown bears". The tribe has 450 enrolled citizens.

== Location ==
Their city Angoon (Tlingit: Aangóon) on Kootznahoo Inlet and Chatham Strait. Angoon is located on Admiralty Island in the Alexander Archipelago in southeast Alaska. Their community is surrounded by the Tongass National Forest.

Angoon can be accessed by ferry or floatplane. The tribe has formed a Roads Committee to plan construction of roads.

== Government ==
The tribe is government by a democratically elected tribal council. Their president is Mary Jean Duncan. They ratified their constitution and by-laws in 1939.

They are a member of the National Congress of American Indians.

== Economic development ==
The Angoon Community Association belongs to Kootznoowoo, Incorporated, an ANCSA Village Corporation which is part of Sealaska Corporation, an Alaska Native Regional Corporation. Kootznoowoo Inc. owns Taquan Air, an Alaska regional airline.

The Chatham School District is a primary employer in the area, and many locals work in commercial fishing. The city has an unemployment rate of 38 percent.

== Notable citizens ==
- Albert Kookesh (2005–2013), Alaska state legislator and senator

== See also ==
- List of Alaska Native tribal entities
