= St. John the Baptist Church (Angoon, Alaska) =

Historic church in Alaska, United States

- U.S. National Register of Historic Places
- Alaska Heritage Resources Survey
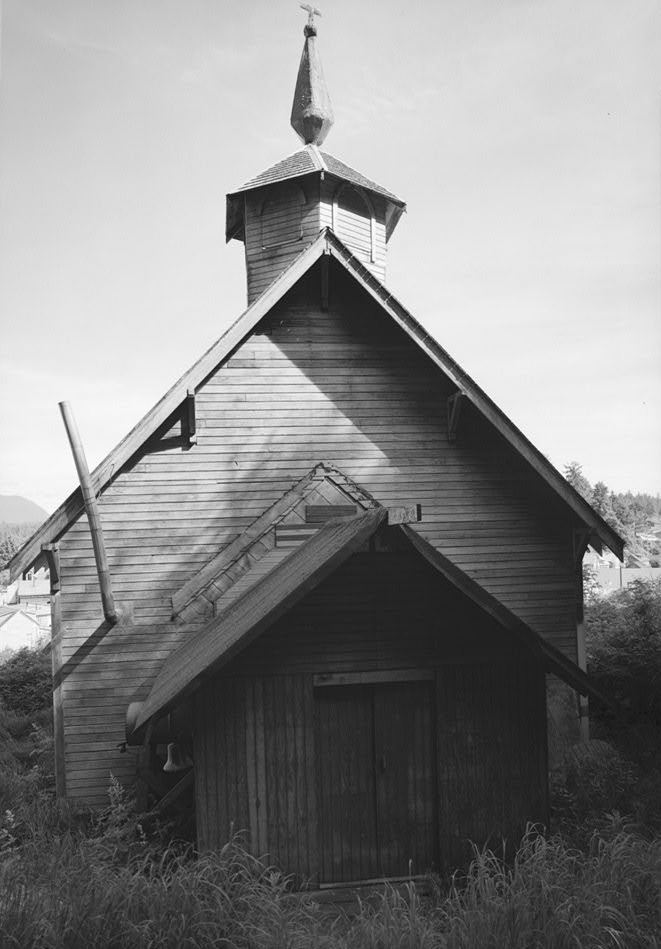

- Location within Alaska
- Location: On hillside north of Beaver Trail Street, Angoon, Alaska
- Coordinates: 57°30′13″N 134°35′14″W
- Area: less than one acre
- Built: 1929
- MPS: Russian Orthodox Church Buildings and Sites TR
- NRHP reference No.: 80004589
- AHRS No.: SIT-055

Significant dates
- Added to NRHP: June 6, 1980
- Designated AHRS: May 18, 1973

The St. John the Baptist Church is a historic Russian Orthodox Church in Angoon, Alaska, United States. It is currently in the Diocese of Alaska of the Orthodox Church in America

This modest wood-frame village church was built 1928–1929, after a fire destroyed the previous church of the parish, at Killisnoo, in 1927. The main chamber is about 38 feet (12 m) long and 22 feet (6.7 m) wide, although it was originally built to a shorter length. Its gabled roof is topped by a square cupola, which is topped by an Orthodox cross. A bell tower rises from the west end above the vestibule.

The church was listed on the National Register of Historic Places in 1980.

== See also ==
- National Register of Historic Places listings in Hoonah-Angoon Census Area, Alaska
