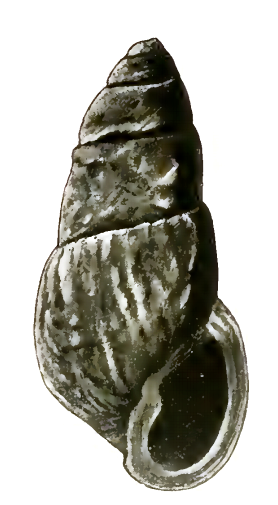
- Apertural view of the shell of Odostomia krausei

Scientific classification
- Kingdom: Animalia
- Phylum: Mollusca
- Class: Gastropoda
- Family: Pyramidellidae
- Genus: Odostomia
- Species: O. krausei

Binomial name
- Odostomia krausei Clessin, 1900

Synonyms
- Aartsenia krausei (Clessin, 1900); Odostomia (Amaura) krausei Clessin, 1900

= Odostomia krausei =

Species of gastropod

Odostomia krausei is a species of sea snail, a marine gastropod mollusc in the family Pyramidellidae, the pyrams and their allies.

== Description ==
The elongate-conic shell is thick and heavy, rough through erosion, yellowish white. Its length measures 9.9 mm. The whorls of the protoconch are decollated in the type, judging from the pit in the apex they are probably deeply, obliquely immersed. The six whorls of the teleoconch are only moderately rounded, somewhat shouldered at the summit (surface decidedly eroded). The periphery and the base of the body whorl are well rounded, the latter with a minute umbilical chink. The aperture is ear-shaped, somewhat effuse anteriorly. The posterior angle is scarcely acute. The outer lip is very thick, reflexed. The pillar has a broad, strong, oblique fold, a little anterior to its insertion. The parietal wall is covered by a thick callus.

== Distribution ==
This species occurs in the Pacific Ocean off Killisnoo, Alaska, and Kodiak Island.
