= Wrangell Bombardment =

US Army attack in Alaska

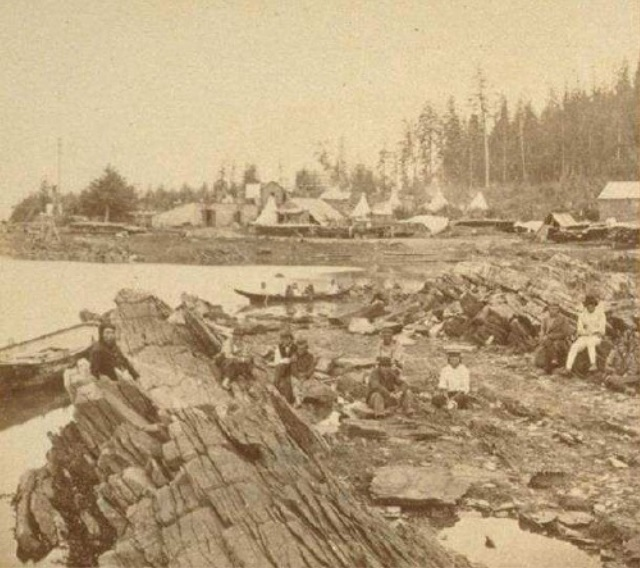
- View of Fort Wrangell under construction in background, Stikine in foreground, 1868
Date	December 25–29, 1869
Location	Wrangell, Alaska 56°23′06″N 132°05′11″W
Result	Stikine surrender of murderer to the U.S. Army, court martial, and execution

Belligerents
United States Army	Stikine people

Commanders and leaders
First Lieutenant William Borrowe; First Lieutenant Melville R. Loucks	Chief Shakes

Units involved
Detachment from Battery I, 2nd Regiment of Artillery	Irregular force of Stikine villagers, armed with muskets, spears, pistols.

Strength
26 soldiers, log wall fort, 12-pounder mountain howitzer, 6-pounder cannon	508 villagers

Casualties and losses
Leon Smith killed; Civilian woman, finger bitten off	1 killed by gunfire, 1 executed; 1 severely wounded (possibly died of his wounds later); Artillery bombardment casualties uncertain
- Location within Alaska

The Wrangell Bombardment was the bombardment of the Stikine village of Old Wrangell (Tlingit: Ḵaachx̱aana.áakʼw) by the United States Army in 1869. The army issued an ultimatum to the villagers, demanding they deliver a Stikine named Scutd-doo to justice following the retribution murder of Leon Smith by Scutd-doo. Scutd-doo's son, Lowan, had earlier been killed by soldiers following an altercation in which he bit off a finger of the wife of the quartermaster of Fort Wrangell.

Following a two-day bombardment of the village and return musket fire by Stikine skirmishers, Scutd-doo was handed over to the army, court-martialed, and in the first application of the death penalty in Alaska under U.S. rule, was hanged before the garrison and Stikine villagers.

== Background ==
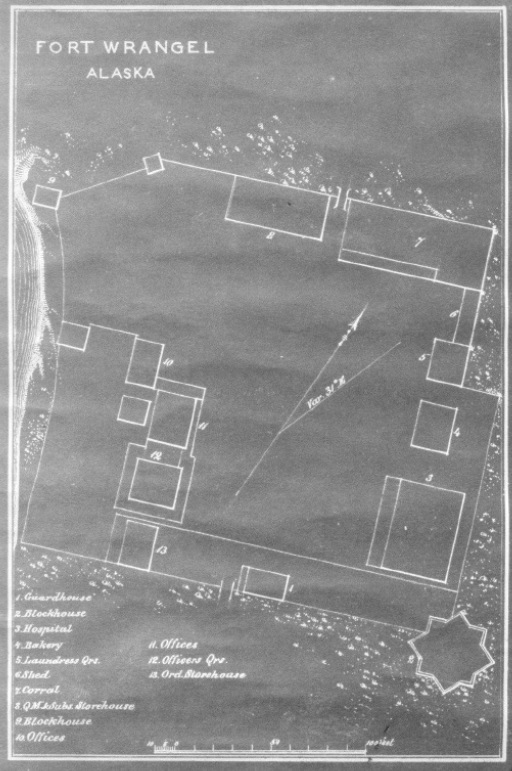
Architectural layout map of Fort Wrangell, dated circa 1877

Following the Alaska Purchase, the United States Army came to Alaska to serve as the civil administering entity of the Department of Alaska. In the summer of 1868 a detachment from Battery I of the 2nd Regiment of Artillery established a small outpost at Fort Wrangell (which was previously a trading post) in a 200 by 200 feet area, surrounded by a 10-foot log wall with elevated platforms, a 12-pounder mountain howitzer, and a 6-pounder cannon. In December 1869 the fort was garrisoned by 26 soldiers, with accompanying civilians.

Adjacent to the fort, the village of Old Wrangell (Tlingit: Ḵaachx̱aana.áakʼw) established in the 1830s adjacent to the trading post contained some 508 Stikine people (a Tlingit group) in 1869.

The U.S. authorities used common law, while the Tlingit people used indigenous law. Americans generally characterized the Tlingit legal framework as based on "revenge"; in actuality it was more complex and involved "peace ceremonies" which included compensation in either goods or human lives.

In February 1869 a similar incident dubbed the Kake War led to the destruction of three deserted villages and two forts near present-day Kake, Alaska by the USS Saginaw. Prior to the conflict, two white trappers were killed by the Kake in retribution for the death of two Kake departing Sitka village in canoe. Sitka was the site of a standoff between the Army and Tlingit due to the army demanding the surrender of chief Colchika who was involved in an altercation in Fort Sitka.

Leon Smith was a former steamboat captain and Confederate volunteer who served during the American Civil War as Commander of the Texas Marine Department. During the war, Smith's rank was variously described as naval lieutenant, captain, and commodore or army major, and colonel, but he was not actually commissioned. He operated the trading post and bowling alley adjacent to the fort in partnership with William King Lear. Smith lived outside the fort, and was involved in late October 1869 in the beating of a Stikine he suspected (wrongly) of hitting his son.

== Christmas night altercation ==
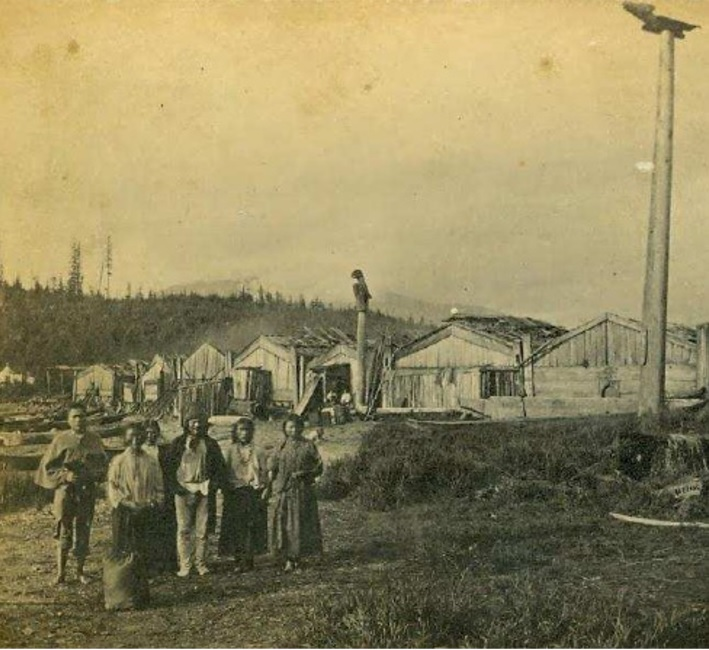
Village of Wrangell, 1868, in present-day Front Street

On Christmas night, Stikine villagers were invited to a Christmas party hosted by the Fort Wrangell soldiers in the upper floor of Quartermaster Sergeant Jacob Muller's residence. The party apparently also involved liquor, although subsequent reports by the Army omit this fact since serving alcohol to natives was against Federal law.

Mrs. Jacob Muller intervened in a dispute between a Stikine named Lowan (Note: Stikine names vary widely between sources, Lowan is also given as Si-wau and Shawaan) and Lowan's wife, during which the third finger on her right hand was bitten off by Lowan. Army and native accounts of subsequent events differ. The army report claimed that a party of twenty soldiers was sent to arrest Lowan in the village, whereas native sources claim the events led to an immediate altercation in the fort itself. Regardless of the location, sources agree that Lowan was shot and killed by soldiers and that an additional Stikine (possibly his brother) by the name of Isteen (Note: Stikine names vary widely between sources, Isteen is also given as Esteen) was severely wounded (possibly mortally).

The Stikine probably demanded a compensation payment that was refused, and in the following morning, 26 December, Scutd-doo, (Note: Stikine names vary widely between sources, Scutd-doo is also given as Shx'atoo and Scutdor) who was the father (Note: Some sources do not specify an exact relationship, and Emmons states cousin and not father) of Lowan, approached the fort, finding Smith near the trading post outside of the fort, and shot him multiple times. Smith was found by Lieutenant Loucks. Lt. Loucks went out of the fort to investigate; Smith died of his wounds some 13 hours later.

== Ultimatum and bombardment ==
U.S. Army officers demanded the surrender of the murderer by the Stikine, delivering an ultimatum with a deadline of noon, and stating that they would bombard the village and that the village would be destroyed as had been done in February 1869 in Kake, Alaska.

After the deadline passed, the army commenced with bombardment of the village with continuous fire from the 6-pounder cannon, and the villagers returned fire with muskets. The Stikine attempted to take out the artillery by positioning musket-armed skirmishers in an advantageous position on a hill overlooking the fort from the rear, however they were repulsed with canister shot.

The following day, the 27th of December, saw additional skirmishes between the Stikine and the garrison, and the army fired explosive shells from the 12-pounder mountain howitzer at the village as well. The Stikine raised the flag of truce over Chief Shakes' house after some two hours.

The villagers approached the fort with Scutd-doo, however he ran away from the group as they got near the fort. The army, unconvinced by this apparent escape, demanded his wife (Note: Some sources (the army report and Emmons) state mother instead of wife) and sub-chief be turned over as hostages. After a few hours Scutd-doo surrendered to the army.

== Court martial and hanging ==
On 28 December, an army court-martial was convened in the fort, with the jury consisting of Lieutenants Borrowe and Loucks, Smith's partner William K. Lear, and Acting Assistant Surgeon H. M. Kirke. At the trial Scutd-doo confessed to killing Smith, but under the premise of doing so to make amends according to Tlingit law. Scutd-doo further said as the sentence was read "very well, that he had killed a tyhee [chief], and not a common man; that he would see Mr. Smith in the other world, and, as it were, explain to him how it all happened; that he did not intend to kill Mr. Leon Smith, particularly; had it been anyone else, it would have been the same."

Scutd-doo was hanged the next day, 29 December, the first application of the death penalty in Alaska under U.S. rule. The hanging was carried out in front of the garrison and several Stikine, and the body was left hanging until nightfall as a warning to the village.

== Aftermath ==
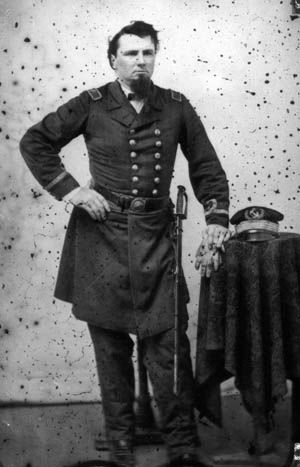
Leon Smith in Confederate uniform

Smith's body was transferred for burial in San Francisco, and possibly onward to Texas in the city cemetery in Houston.

A report from Acting Assistant Surgeon H. M. Kirke and First Lieutenant William Borrowe has been described by activist and scholar Polly Miller as a "model of brevity":

SIR: I have the honor to report as the result of the late Indian trouble:

One (1) white man, Mr. Leon Smith, Killed.

One (1) Indian killed.

One (1) white woman, company laundress, finger bitten off.

One (1) Indian severely wounded, by gun-shot fracture of the right humerus.

One (1) Indian hung.

— H.M. Kirke & W.M. Borrowe, 29 December 1869 letter to the Acting Assistant Adjutant General

Following press coverage, a full report on the bombardment was presented in 1870 to the President and the Congress by the secretary of the Board of Indian Commissioners, Vincent Colyer. The report contained the reports of the Secretary of War, and the Secretary of the Interior.

Subsequent legal interpretation found that the army did not have the legal authority to try civilians in a court-martial and sentence them to death in the Department of Alaska.

A similar incident in October 1882, the Angoon Bombardment, led to the destruction of Angoon, Alaska by US Naval forces, after the Angoon Tlingit demanded compensation and took white hostages following the accidental death of a shaman who was working on a whaling ship.

The incident was one of several short, but violent, clashes between the Tlingit and occupying soldiers – sparked at least in part by cultural misunderstandings. Russell Estlack argued that after the army departed Alaska in 1887, its "dismal record during the occupation was mainly the punishment of Indians for quarrels the soldiers initiated by their own acts."

== Bibliography ==
- Lubbock, Francis Richard (1900). Six decades in Texas; or, Memoirs of Francis Richard Lubbock, governor of Texas in war time, 1861–63. A personal experience in business, war, and politics. Austin, B. C. Jones & co., printers.
