= Kootznahoo Inlet =

Coordinates: 57.532°N 134.518°W

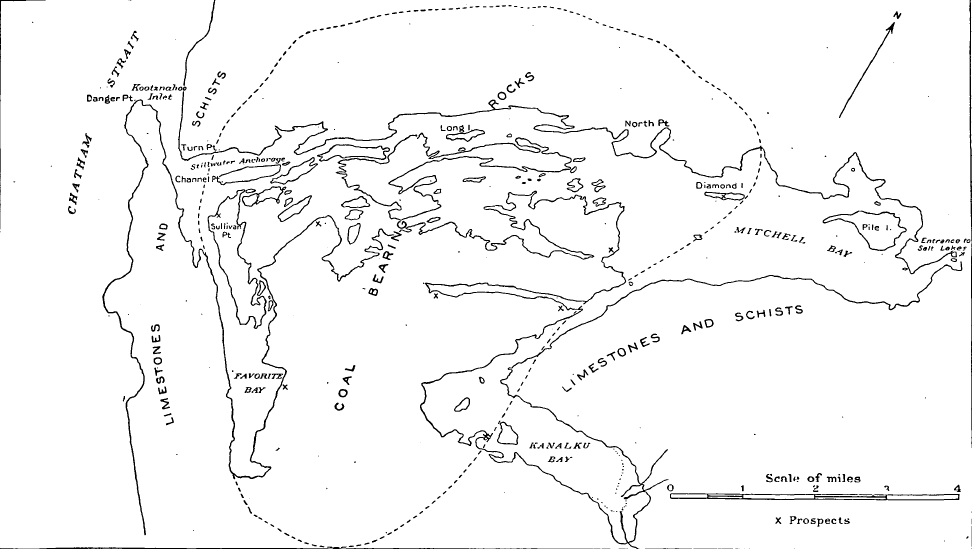
Map of the Kootznahoo Inlet

Kootznahoo Inlet is located on the eastern shore of Chatham Strait in the U.S. state of Alaska. Comprising an area of about 15 square miles (39 km^{2}), it is an intricate group of narrow passages, lagoons, and bays, having its entrance 3 miles (4.8 km) north of Killisnoo. Kootznahoo, which means bear fortress, is also the name given by the Tlingit to mean Admiralty. The Kootznoowoo Wilderness also of the Admiralty Island covers some of the largest reserve areas covering about 1 million acres. The island is inhabited by about 1500 brown bears, the largest number recorded anywhere on the earth.

== Geography and geology ==
The inlet is full of rocks and reefs. The general elevation of the surrounding land is less than 100 feet (30 m), and the channels seldom exceed 20 fathoms in depth.

Coal bearing rocks of tertiary age (Eocene and younger) are noted at the inlet in a continuous sequence, The young flora found also point to the Oligocene age overlain by the Miocene age sedimentary rock. Volcanic rocks are noted in the area as seen from the sediment deposits at the inlet. The geological formation of conglomerate, sandstone, siltstone, shale and coal in and around the inlet extending to a thickness varying from 2000 to 5000 ft are named as Kootznahoo Formation.

== Fauna ==
The salmon fish catches reported from this area are, sockeye/red salmon, herring, chum/dog salmon, chinook/king salmon, and pink salmon (humpies). Other fauna reported are bear, beaver, mink and sea otter.

== Culture ==
The inlet Is also called Bay Tlein. It was originally with the Deishheatan people who came here because of finding beaver. The Mitchell Bay at the head of inlet was occupied by the Teokwedi clan. Later, Angoon people also used this inlet and built a village here for fishing, hunting and trapping. Angoon people held possessory rights over the shores of this inlet and lakes and the interior of the Admiralty Island which drained into this inlet.
