= Killisnoo Island =

Killisnoo Island, Alaska
- Island
- Interactive map of Killisnoo Island, Alaska
- Coordinates: 57°28′11″N 134°35′26″W
- Country: United States
- State: Alaska
- Time zone: UTC-9 (Alaska)
  - Summer (DST): UTC-8 (Alaska)

Killisnoo Island is a small island in the Alexander Archipelago in southeastern Alaska, at 57°28′11″N 134°35′26″W. It is located just off the central west coast of Admiralty Island, south of the city of Angoon. Killisnoo Island, an unincorporated area, is a settlement on the island.

== History ==
In 1878, the North West Trading Company established a trading post and whaling station on nearby Killisnoo Island and villagers were employed to hunt whales. Whaling, a BIA school and a Russian Orthodox Church attracted many Tlingits to Killisnoo.

In 1882, The first commercial herring fishery begins at Killisnoo; near Angoon and the first two canneries are built in Central Alaska.

In 1886, Alaska Northwest Trading Company was built within the Tlingit Village on Killisnoo Island. The site again was chosen due to the prosperous fishery and the calm inside passage of Chatham Strait.
