= Albert Kookesh =

American politician (1948–2021)

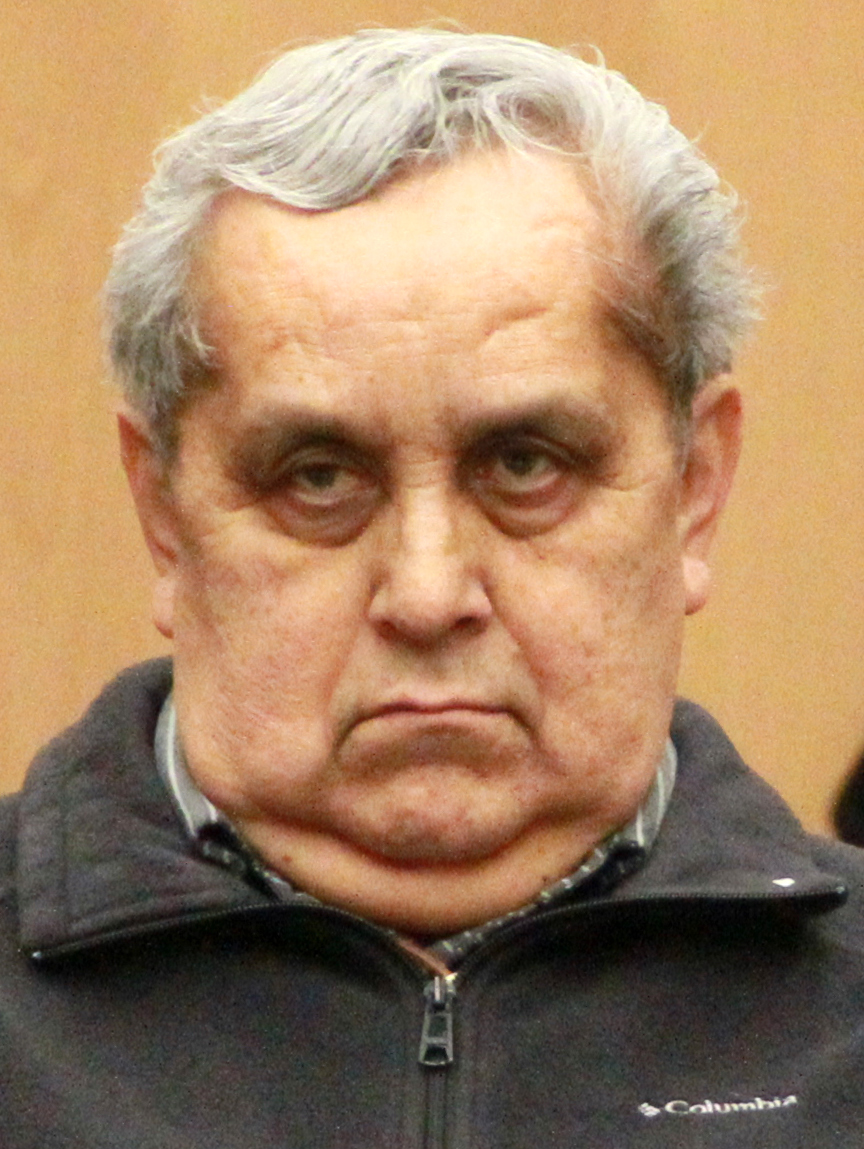

Member of the Alaska Senate from the C district
- In office January 10, 2005 – January 15, 2013
- Preceded by: Georgianna Lincoln
- Succeeded by: Click Bishop

Member of the Alaska House of Representatives from the 5th district
- In office January 13, 1997 – January 10, 2005
- Preceded by: Jerry Mackie
- Succeeded by: William "Bill" Thomas, Jr.

Personal details
- Born: November 24, 1948 Juneau, Alaska
- Died: May 28, 2021 (aged 72) Angoon, Alaska
- Party: Democratic
- Spouse: Sally Woods Kookesh
- Education: Alaska Pacific University; University of Washington

Albert Matthew Kookesh, Jr. (November 24, 1948 – May 28, 2021) was an American politician who served as a member of the Alaska Senate. He represented District C as a Democrat from 2005 through 2013. Previously he was a member of the Alaska House of Representatives from 1997 through 2005.

Kookesh received his Juris Doctor degree from the University of Washington in 1976 and was a commercial fisherman, who owned and operated a lodge and market. He was on the board of directors of the Sealaska Corporation and was a co-chair of the Alaska Federation of Natives. His earlier professional positions included Business Manager, Executive VP, and Acting President/CEO for Kootznoowoo Inc.

He was a citizen of the Angoon Community Association, and the Tlingit Nation, Eagle Moiety, Teikweidí (Brown Bear) Clan, child of L'eeneidí (Dog Salmon) Clan.

He died on May 28, 2021, in Angoon, Alaska at age 72.

== Electoral career ==
In 2010 a legislative review found Kookesh to be in violation of state ethics policies following allegations that he used political influence to keep a city council from opposing a lands bill pushed by the Native corporation by which he was employed. He lost the 2012 election to fellow incumbent Bert Stedman after the Alaska Redistricting Board placed him in a district that was vastly different from his former bush district.
