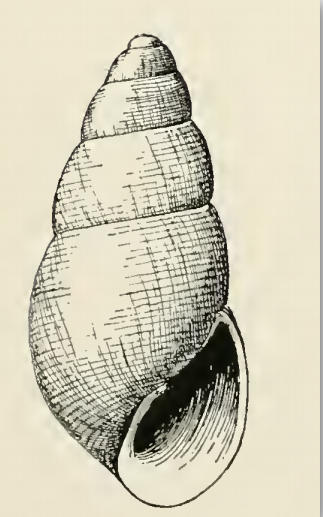
- Apertural view of the shell of Odostomia killisnooensis

Scientific classification
- Kingdom: Animalia
- Phylum: Mollusca
- Class: Gastropoda
- Family: Pyramidellidae
- Genus: Odostomia
- Species: O. killisnooensis

Binomial name
- Odostomia killisnooensis Dall & Bartsch, 1909

Synonyms
- Odostomia (Evalea) killisnooensis Dall & Bartsch, 1909 (basionym)

= Odostomia killisnooensis =

Species of gastropod

Odostomia killisnooensis is a species of sea snail, a marine gastropod mollusc in the family Pyramidellidae, the pyramids and their allies.

== Description ==
The yellowish white shell is very elongate ovate, and umbilicated. It is thick and robust. Its length measures 6.4 mm. The whorls of the protoconch are very small, obliquely, almost completely immersed in the first of the succeeding turns. The six whorls of the teleoconch are evenly, moderately rounded, with very faintly shouldered summits. The spiral sculpture is strong, marked by numerous, fairly strong, equal and equally closely spaced, wavy, spiral striations ( = grooves), and fine retractive lines of growth. The periphery and the base of the body whorl are well rounded and marked like the spire. The sutures are well impressed. The aperture is ovate, somewhat effuse anteriorly. The posterior angle is acute. The outer lip is thin. The columella is very oblique The columellar fold is decidedly posterior to the middle of the columella., posterior two-thirds straight, and strongly reflected, the anterior third strongly curved. The columellar fold is strong, oblique and situated at the insertion of the columella. The parietal wall is covered by a thin callus.

== Distribution ==
The type specimen was collected off Killisnoo, Alaska.
