= Cape Corwin =

Easternmost point of Nunivak Island, Alaska, US

Coordinates: 59°55′20″N 165°35′08″W

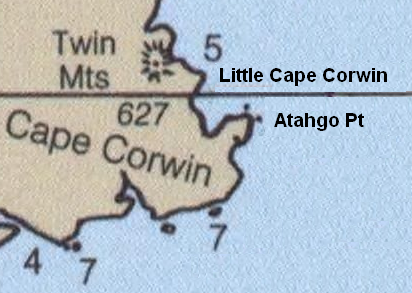
Cape Corwin detail (Coast Survey); labels per USGS

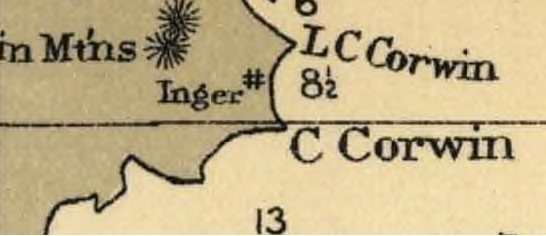
Cape Corwin detail from USCGS 1911 chart

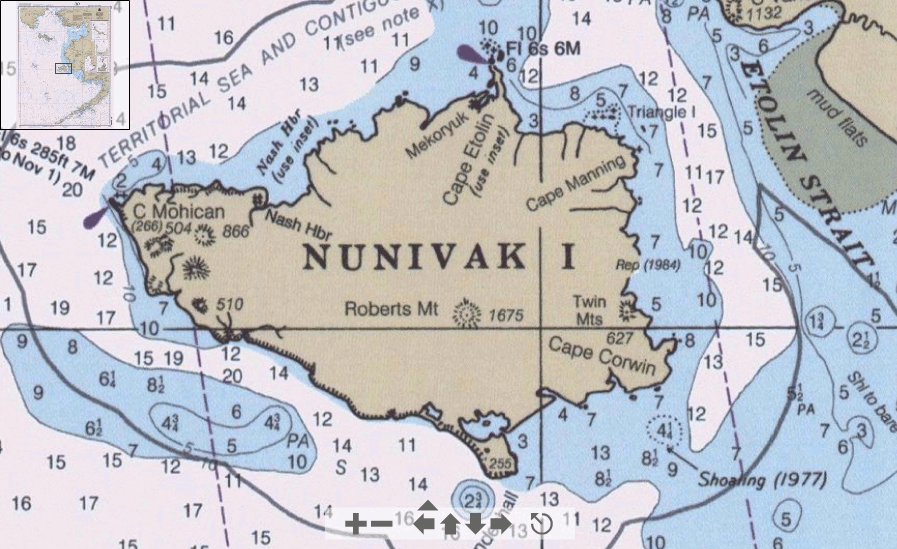
Nunivak Island US Coast Survey chart detail; Cape Corwin lower right

Cape Corwin is the easternmost point of Nunivak Island in the Bering Sea in the U.S. state of Alaska. In the Cup'ig language it is known as Cing'ig ("point", as in point of land). According to Donald Orth (1967, Dictionary of Alaska Place Names) the name marks the southwest entrance point to Etolin Strait. According to local usage the feature is misnamed on official United States Geological Survey maps. Since the name was reported to USGS by the USCGS in "about 1908" (the Board of Geographic Names decision was in 1906, and Baker reports USCGS began using it in 1899) it may have subsequently migrated to the next northernmost point of land, Cing'ig. The 1911 USCGS chart does not accurately represent the shape of the coast here; the point and the cape are not separately identifiable. The USGS lists Atahgo Point, Valilief Cape, and Chingeleth Point as alternative names for Cape Corwin; Atahgo point also has its own listing with distinct coordinates.

Cape Corwin may have been named for USRC Corwin which patrolled the Bering Sea in the 1880s and 1890s and made systematic depth soundings around Nunivak Island in 1899 Capes Manning, Mohican, and Algonquin on Nunivak Island also correspond with ships (Revenue Service, Navy and Coast Guard, respectively) of the Bering Sea Squadron and the Bering Sea Patrol. A 95-foot steel-hull U.S. Coast Guard patrol boat, built in 1958, operated as USCGC Cape Corwin from 1964 to 1990. This is reportedly the vessel that appeared in the opening credits of Hawaii Five-O.
