= Etolin Strait =

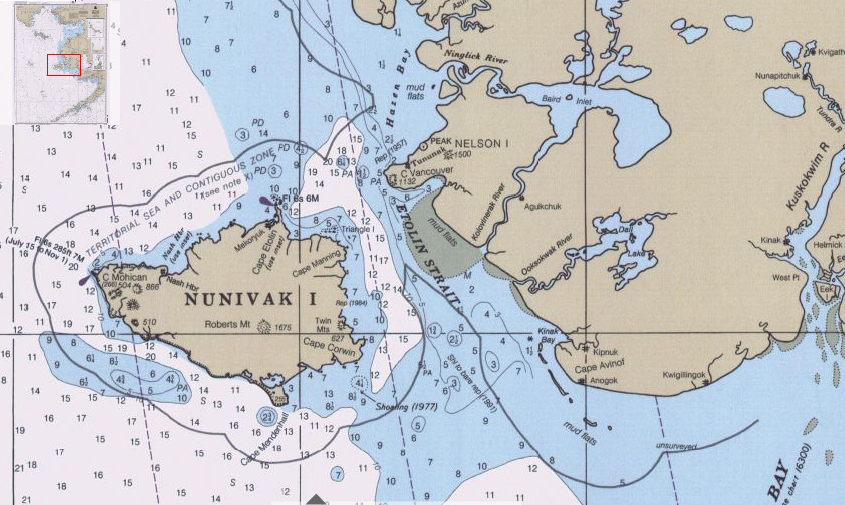
Etolin Strait and Surroundings. Office of Coast Survey chart detail 2000

Etolin Strait is a strait of the Pacific Ocean in western Alaska, the United States. It is located inside the Nunivak Island, Etolin Strait, and Kuskokwim Bay Habitat Conservation Area, an 8.2 million acre essential fish habitat established in 2008 which prohibits fishing with nonpelagic trawl gear.

== Geography ==
The strait connects Kuskokwim Bay and the Bering Sea, at 60°20′N 165°25′W. It is 96 km (60 mi) long and 48–80 km (30-50) miles wide. It is known for strong tidal currents.

It is between Nunivak Island to its west and Nelson Island and the Alaskan mainland to its east. It is demarcated by Cape Etolin to the northwest and Cape Corwin to the southwest (both on Nunivak Island), by Cape Vancouver on Nelson Island to the northeast, and by Cape Avinol on the Alaskan mainland to the southeast.

== History ==
Etolin Strait is named after Adolf Etolin, who was the first European to discover it, and originally named it Cook Strait. Etolin was subsequently the colonial governor of Russian America from 1840 to 1845.
