= USRC Thomas Corwin =

U.S. revenue cutter and merchant ship

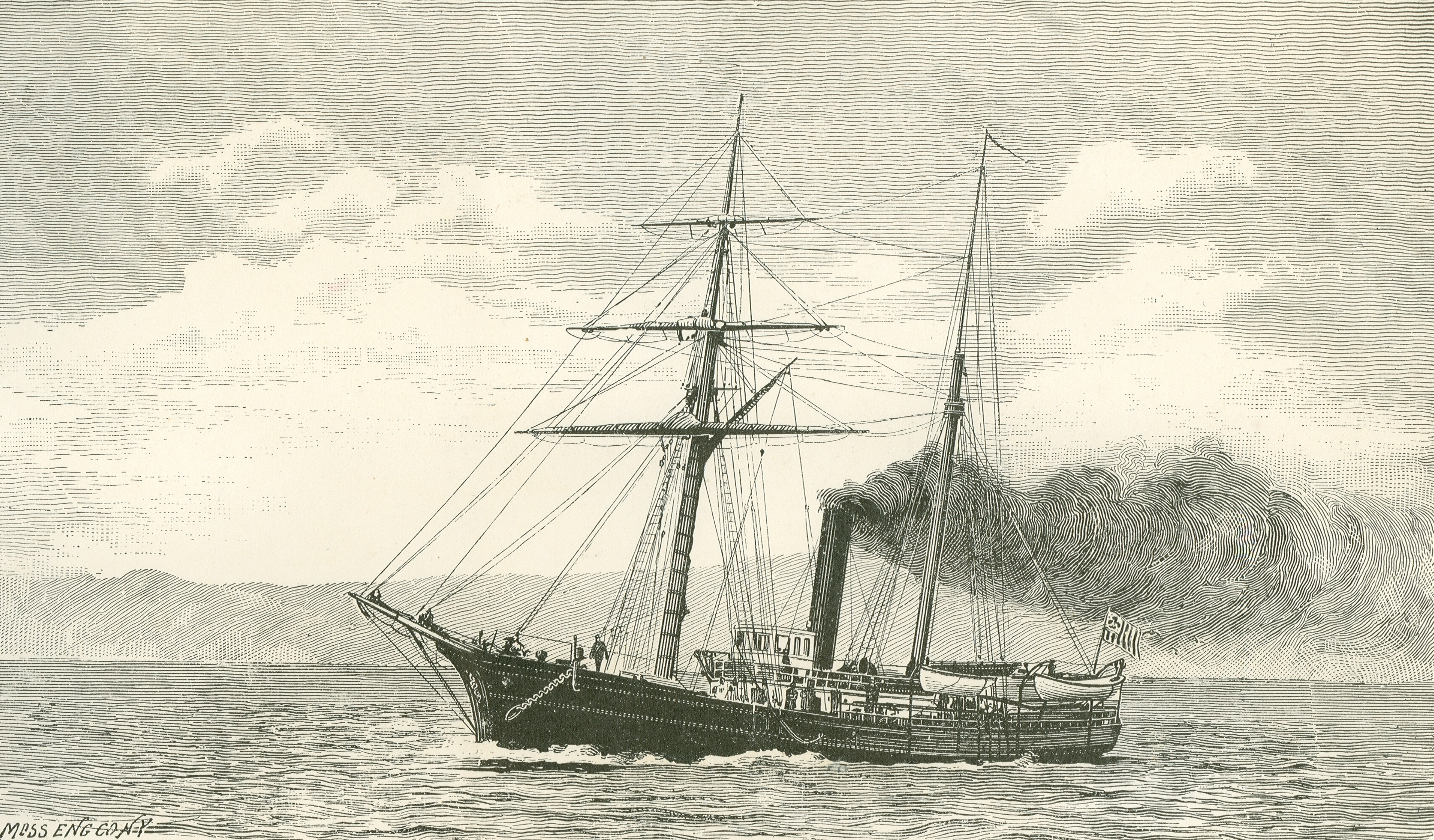
- Departure for Alaska, 1885

History

United States
- Name: USRC Thomas Corwin
- Builder: Oregon Iron Works
- Cost: $92,000
- Launched: 23 August 1876
- Commissioned: 17 July 1877
- In service: 1877–1900
- Fate: Sold 14 February 1900
- Notes: Continued operating as a merchant vessel
- Name: SS Corwin
- Owner: Corwin Trading Co., Pacific Coal and Transportation Co., various
- Port of registry: Boston; Seattle
- Route: Seattle, Nome, Western Alaska coastal ports
- Acquired: 1900
- In service: 1900, 1902–1915
- Out of service: 1901
- Fate: Burned in drydock 1916

General characteristics as built
- Displacement: 227 tons
- Length: 140 ft 7 in (42.85 m)
- Beam: 24 ft (7.3 m)
- Draft: 10 ft 10 in (3.30 m)
- Depth: 11 ft 1 1/2 in (3.391 m)
- Propulsion: Inverted-cylinder single-stage steam engine, 34" diameter × 34" stroke, single screw disconnected for sailing
- Sail plan: Topsail schooner
- Speed: 11.5 knots steam, 12 knots sail, 14 knots combined
- Complement: 8 officers 33 enlisted
- Armament: 3 guns, unknown type and caliber

General characteristics 1900–1903
- Tonnage: 307 gross, 153 net
- Length: 137.5 ft (41.9 m)
- Beam: 24 ft (7.3 m)
- Depth: 11.3 ft (3.4 m)
- Sail plan: Brigantine (aka hermaphrodite brig)
- Speed: 9 knots

General characteristics 1904–1916
- Tonnage: 447 gross, 239 net
- Length: 138 ft (42 m)
- Beam: 24 ft (7.3 m)
- Depth: 13.2 ft (4.0 m)
- Decks: 2

The Thomas Corwin was a revenue cutter of the United States Revenue-Marine and United States Revenue Cutter Service and subsequently a merchant vessel. These two very different roles both centered on Alaska and the Bering Sea. In 1912, Frank Willard Kimball wrote: "The Corwin has probably had a more varied and interesting career than any other vessel which plies the Alaskan waters."

Thomas Corwin was the first revenue cutter to regularly cruise the Bering Sea and the Arctic Ocean. Built in the state of Oregon, she was finished and commissioned in San Francisco which remained her home port. In a 23-year federal career, she participated in the search for the USS Jeannette, landed scientific parties on Wrangel and Herald islands, took part in the shelling of the Tlingit village Angoon, interdicted whiskey traffic, rescued shipwrecked whalers, contributed to the exploration of Alaska, and arrested seal poachers. She had at least eight captains during her federal career, but is particularly associated with two: the cool and resolute Calvin L. Hooper and the volatile Michael A. Healy. She continued operating in the Bering Sea as a merchant and charter vessel after she was sold in 1900.

As a merchant vessel, the SS Corwin started out as a support vessel for minerals exploration, and subsequently was extensively modified to carry passengers. She served coastal ports on Norton and Kotzebue Sounds, the Seward Peninsula, and the Bering Strait during the shipping season, and generally wintered in Puget Sound. She was the first steamer to reach Nome in the spring multiple years, and also frequently the last steamer out in the fall. Her Master through most of her commercial service was Ellsworth Luce West. She attempted to rescue the Karluk survivors from Wrangel Island and participated in the search for four missing Karluk crewmen in 1914.

== Construction ==
The Corwin was named for Thomas Corwin, a well-known mid-nineteenth-century politician who served as Secretary of the Treasury during Millard Fillmore's presidency. She was the second of three Revenue Cutter Service and Coast Guard vessels to bear the name (there was also a patrol boat Cape Corwin).

She was built as a single-screw steam-powered topsail schooner by Oregon Iron Works at Albina (Portland) Oregon in 1876 and commissioned at San Francisco in 1877. She was constructed of fir and "fastened with copper, galvanized iron, and locust tree nails". Her appearance was typical of revenue cutters of the period, flush-decked (or nearly so) with clipper bow, fantail stern, two sail-bearing masts, pilot house and funnel amidships and a deckhouse (probably including the upper parts of the engine and boiler rooms) beneath and extending behind the pilot house. The boiler powering the propulsion machinery was of the Scotch marine boiler type and was the first instance of that type of boiler on a Revenue Cutter Service vessel. The addition of steam jackets on the cylinders to reduce condensation losses was another innovation new to the service. Her cost and displacement were somewhat greater than the Dexter-class (1874) cutters of similar length and overall design. The Dexter-class consisted of Dexter, Rush, and Dallas.

Construction of the Corwin was contracted in May 1875 with completion scheduled for February 28, 1876. Captain John W. White was construction superintendent for the Revenue Cutter Service. The Corwin was the first government vessel constructed in the state of Oregon, and a large crowd came out to see her launched August 23, 1876. Oregon Iron Works became insolvent that fall and was declared bankrupt; this resulted in liens filed against the vessel by suppliers and subcontractors for unpaid bills. On January 2, 1877, Judge J. Deady of the U.S. District Court, Oregon District ruled that the lien of libellants Coffin and Hendry was valid, that the government was not yet the owner of the vessel and had not been in possession when the vessel was seized by the marshal on November 29. However, the Corwin had been extricated about January 1, 1877 by Captain White and the USRC Rush and moved to the middle of the Columbia River (another source has this about January 10). The Government appealed Judge Deady's ruling and Coffin and Hendry withdrew their claim on the basis of assurances that they would be paid faster if they settled. After a flurry of unsuccessful legal actions by other claimants, the Corwin was removed to San Francisco where she was completed at a cost of $10150.77 and subsequently commissioned. Congress was still considering suppliers and workmen's claims in 1884.

The Corwin was reported to be capable of 12 knots under sail (48-hour average with a beam wind), 11.5 knots under steam alone, and 13–14 knots under combined power. In 1900, her speed (probably cruising speed) was reported as 9 knots. Details of the Corwin's original three-gun armament are not available. In 1891 she reportedly carried four three-inch breech-loading rifles and two Gatling guns. In July 1891, The New York Times reported that she would be rearmed with six-pounder Hotchkiss rapid-fire guns.

== Federal career ==
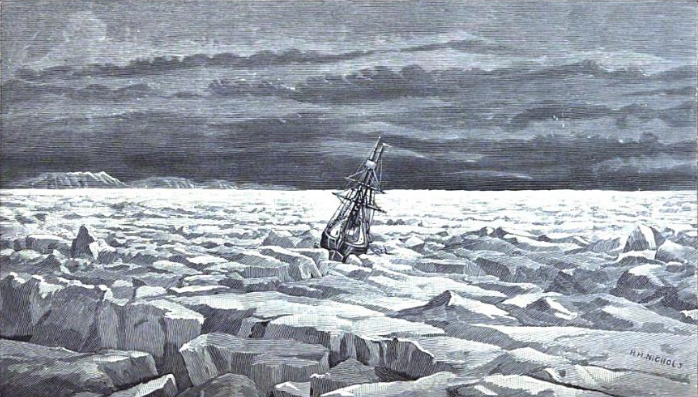
Corwin caught and lifted by ice floes, Bering Sea, 1880

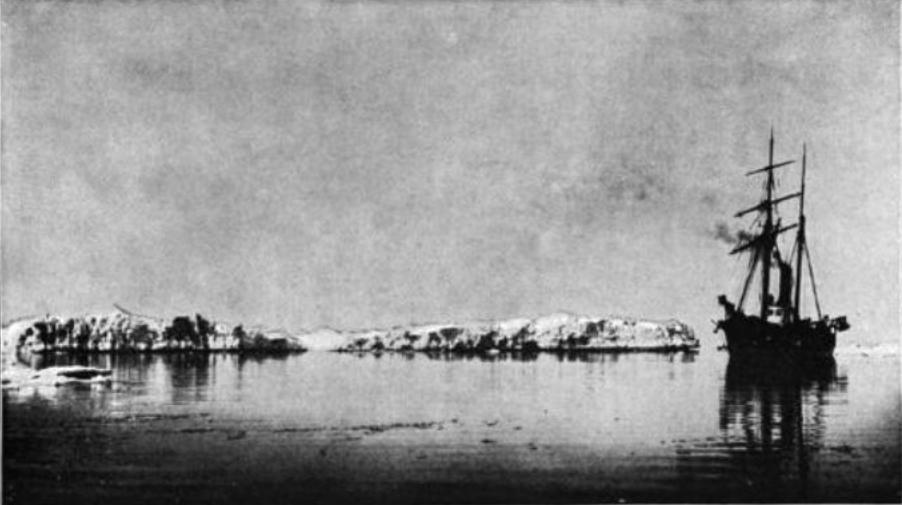
Corwin entering a lead 1884

The Corwin spent her entire career in the Pacific and Arctic oceans; her home port throughout her government service was San Francisco. She made her first trip to northern waters in 1877 under Captain J.W. White. In 1880 and 1881 with Calvin L. Hooper commanding and Michael Healy as Executive Officer, she searched in the Arctic for the USS Jeannette, a lost exploration vessel, and two lost whaleships, Vigilant and Mount Wollaston. For this expedition, she was sheathed with one-inch oak planks from two feet above the water line to six feet below, with the oak applied over the copper and secured with 2.5-inch composition nails. Also added was an ice-breaking attachment for her bow, constructed of 3/8 inch iron plate, which could be put in place when needed. Captain Hooper sent out exploratory parties by dogsled along the Siberian arctic coast. Artifacts and stories collected from the Chukchi residents of the coast confirmed that the Vigilant had been lost with no survivors, and apparently had picked up survivors from the Mount Wollaston before her own disaster. In the course of the Corwin's 1880 cruise, Captain Hooper located and mapped coal deposits in cliffs east of Cape Lisburne, Alaska, previously discovered by Captain E. E. Smith, the Corwin's ice pilot. The crew mined coal from these deposits in both 1880 and 1881, and the site has since been known as the Corwin coal mine. On a visit to various Alaskan islands, they confirmed the St. Lawrence Island famine which killed over 1000 people.

In 1881 the Corwin carried a scientific detachment including John Muir, Irving C. Rosse, M.D., and Edward W. Nelson, and in the course of the search for the Jeannette landed parties on Herald and Wrangel Islands in the Chukchi Sea. In 1882, with Michael Healy as captain, the Corwin was dispatched to St Lawrence Bay to pick up the stranded crew of the USS Rodgers, another ship of the Jeannette search which burned while overwintering in Siberia. The Rodgers crew was picked up by the whaler North Star and later transferred to the Corwin which returned them to San Francisco. In October 1882 she participated in the Angoon Bombardment which was the shelling and burning of the Tlingit village Angoon in retaliation for a hostage-taking incident. A contemporary letter discovered about 1990 partly confirms and partly refutes the official Navy account of this incident. Her voyages in 1884 and 1885 included explorations by boat detachments of the Kobuk (1884 and 1885; Healy wrote Kowak) and Noatak (1885) rivers in Alaska and the first ascent and investigation of the newly formed Bogoslof volcano in the Aleutians.

The Corwin was replaced on the Arctic patrol by the USRC Bear starting in 1886. Among the reasons for this change was the Corwin's limited coal capacity which interfered with long cruises. The Corwin returned to the Bering Sea in 1886 and from 1890 to 1897 to combat fur seal poaching. In December 1893 she carried dispatches to US ambassador Albert S. Willis in Hawaii at the height of the political crisis following the deposition of Queen Liliuokalani. Corwin's arrival there caused some consternation since it was thought it might signal US intervention to restore the queen. The Corwin went into the dockyard at Quartermaster Harbor, Washington for extensive repairs including refastening and some engine work before the 1896 season. She operated under Navy orders with a Revenue Service crew during the Spanish–American War, serving around San Diego, and was returned to the United States Treasury Department in August 1898. She was back in service in Alaska in 1899 The Corwin was decommissioned and sold February 14, 1900 for US$16,500 and was replaced on the Bering Sea patrol by the USRC Manning. Corwin remained active in the Bering Sea as a merchant and charter vessel after she was sold.

Wrangel Island as seen from the top of Herald Island by a member of the Corwin party, 1881

== Merchant career ==
=== Minerals exploration ===
In 1900 Ellsworth Luce West, a whaling captain from Martha's Vineyard, and some Boston investors formed a company to develop the coal deposits near Cape Lisburne to supply the Nome market. Needing a suitable ship, they entered the winning bid for the Corwin and organized as the Corwin Trading Company. The project increased in scope when one investor (veteran prospector, engineer, and writer A.G. Kingsbury) pledged Nome gold claims for his shares. Although Kingsbury described them as "conservative Boston capitalists" the investors appear to have been as much enthusiasts as any Nome prospectors; all insisted on joining the expedition. To create cargo space in the Corwin, West had the entire wardroom torn out. The lost accommodations were replaced with a cabin constructed from the stern to the engine room, creating a raised poop deck. This modification is shown clearly in a 1902 photograph. West describes the Corwin as brig-rigged in this period, but photos from 1900 continue to show a gaff on the foremast and no yards crossed on the mainmast, so this is more a difference of terminology than a change of sail-plan.

Captain West could not obtain a passenger license for the ship without having her re-caulked, so the small number of passengers were signed as crew members. She went up to Nome carrying expedition equipment and general cargo and from about June 3–10 was occupied with the rescue and salvage of the barkentine Catherine Sudden, which had suffered a punctured hull and two broken masts hitting ice. A little later she set out on a prospecting expedition to Cape Chaplino and stopped at St Lawrence Island about June 17. There she encountered the Russian steamer Progress, chartered by American mining engineer Washington Vanderlip and his Russian backers. Vanderlip hired the Corwin to clear a channel through the ice so Progress could reach Cape Chaplino and the clear water just off the Siberian coast.

Vanderlip described the Corwin's action as an icebreaker: "Some of the ice the Corwin can push to one side or the other but when this is not possible she backs up in order to get good headway and charges the obstruction and strikes it fairly between the eyes. She comes to a dead stop and quivers from stem to stern with the tremendous impact A rending grinding noise is heard and the berg which challenged us is a berg no longer..."

Finding the streams near Cape Chaplino still ice-clogged, the Corwin returned to Nome. In mid-July she headed north on a minerals exploration trip. She reached the coal deposits after prospecting stops at Grantley Harbor (adjacent to Port Clarence, Alaska) and along the coast. The largest seam had already been staked by a competing company (that party traveled by land), but the Corwin's party staked several other claims, mined and loaded coal, and returned to Nome with 100 tons (four lighter-loads) to sell. Coal was handled in sacks of 200 lb, lowered down the cliffs by rope. It reportedly sold tor $18–20 per ton at Nome. A second trip developed the mines and brought out 25 tons.

In April 1901 the Corwin was towed from Port Townsend to Esquimalt and hauled out for refitting. She then spent most of that summer tied to the dock for nonpayment of the dockyard bill. Captain West, who had spent the early part of the season as second mate on an east coast collier, was eventually sent west with $2000 to settle up. After paying the bills, he set about finding work for the vessel to pay her keep. A plan to charter her out for halibut fishing was vetoed by F.W. Huestis, president of the Corwin Trading Company, reportedly because of insurance costs.

=== Passenger and freight service ===
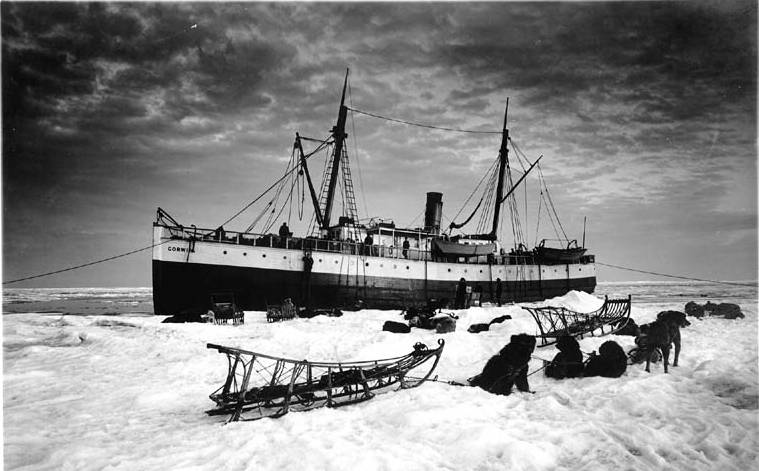
Corwin unloading on sea ice at Nome, June 1, 1907; F.H. Nowell

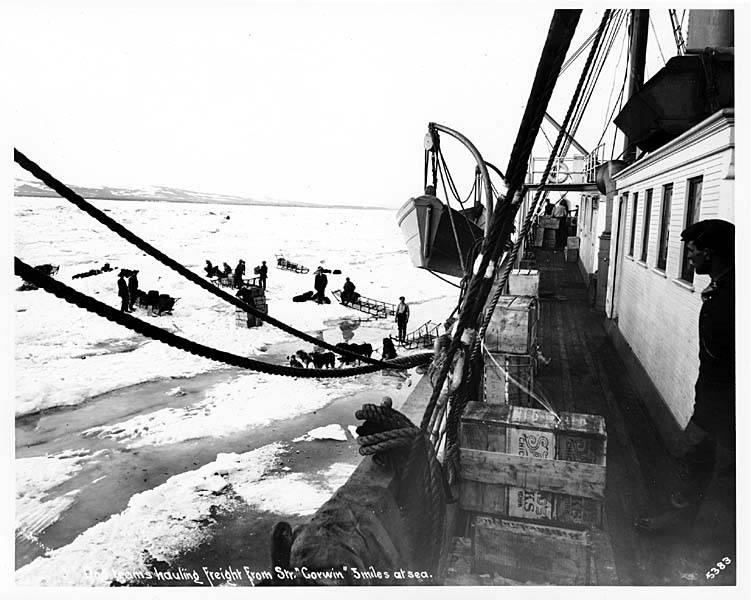
Dogsleds viewed from the Corwin during unloading, 5 miles off shore, June 1, 1907; F.H. Nowell

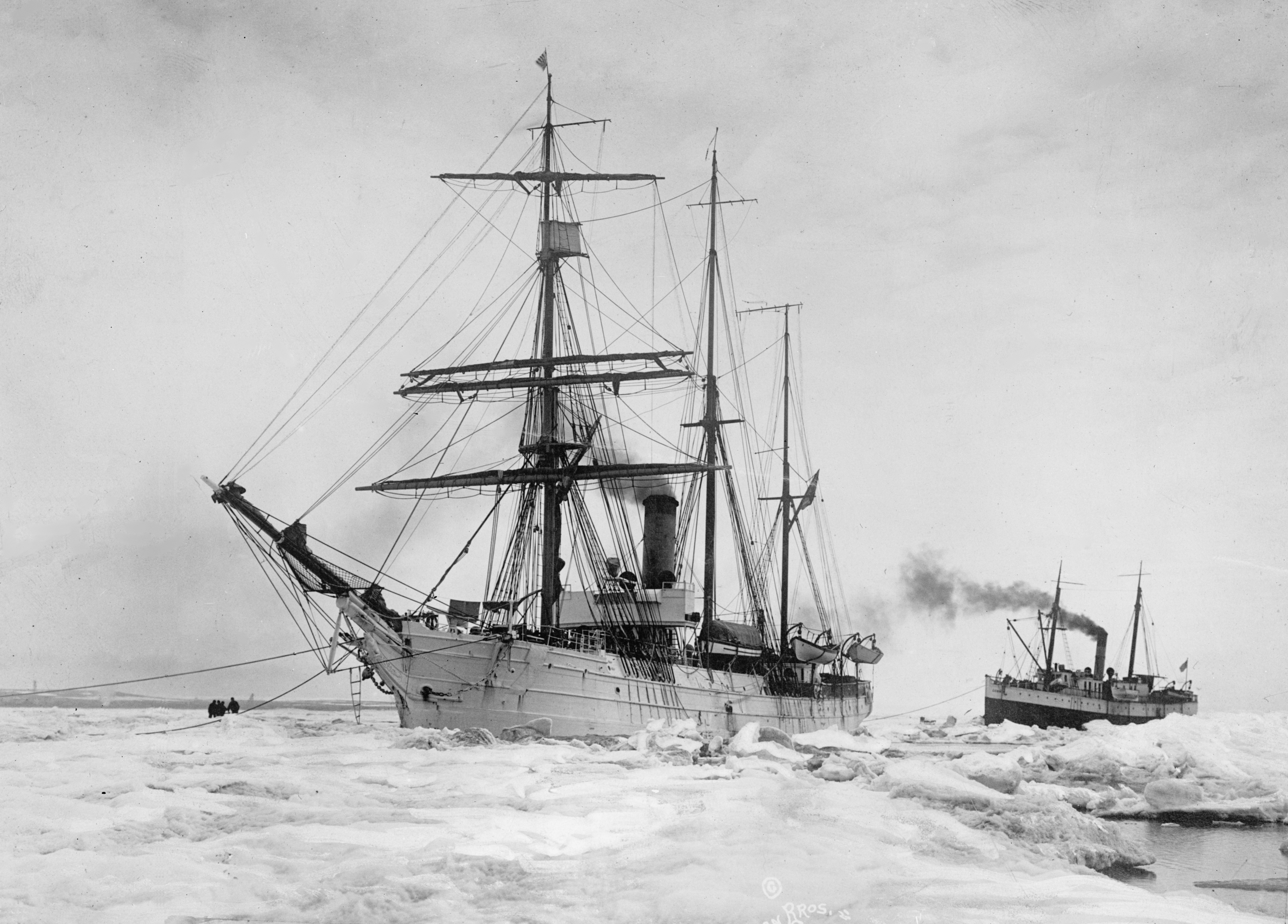
USRC Bear and Corwin shortly after arrival at Nome, June 1, 1914

By 1902 the Corwin was licensed to carry passengers as well as freight. Accommodations were rearranged to carry 35 first-class and 50 steerage passengers. She departed Seattle in May and spent the summer and early fall serving Nome and surrounding towns and camps as far north as Deering on Kotzebue Sound. She underwent further modification at Moran's yard in Seattle before the 1904 season. This work extended or replaced the stern cabin to give her an entire second deck as well as a vertical stem (fitted with a steel ice protector), two new deckhouses, and a forward pilothouse. This so altered her appearance that only a few of her numerous subsequent photographs give any hint of her past as a schooner. Besides the outward changes, she was modernized with the addition of electric lighting throughout the ship and running water in all staterooms. The changes added six first-class staterooms and more steerage space, bringing her capacity to 100 passengers and about 200 tons freight. One source reports the cost of the rebuilding as $40000. When she headed out for Alaska in May 1904 after addition of the second deck there were rumors the modification had made her top-heavy. Some passengers complained before departure that she was overloaded and unseaworthy. Inspectors ordered that all freight be stowed below deck, but permitted her to sail. Subsequently, there were reports that wreckage from the ship had been found on Vancouver Island leading to fears she was lost, but she reached Nome safely on June 8. The Victoria Daily Colonist could not find the origin of the reports and branded them a deliberate hoax.

The Corwin continued in the passenger and freight business and from 1906 to 1910 held a contract to transport mail to towns on Norton Sound and the Seward Peninsula. She was the first ship to reach Nome in the spring in 1902–1909, 1913 and 1914. She generally returned to Puget Sound in the fall and was often the last ship out of Nome. In part, her early arrivals were due to the fact that she was sheathed and retained a protected and reinforced bow for ice work. In 1908, after arriving at Nome during a particularly bad ice season, the Corwin headed out again and cut channels to free three steamers that were stuck in the ice 50 miles from Nome, one (the Victoria) in danger of sinking and all in danger of being carried north by moving ice. On June 11, 1909, Corwin received a distress call from St. Croix a vessel trapped in the ice and taking on water South of Nome. Corwin refused to come to the aid of St. Croix for no less than $6,000. In 1914, it was arranged that she would lead the waiting fleet of steamers into Nome, following closely as the Revenue Cutter Bear picked out a channel through the ice. For most of her merchant career, she was owned by the Pacific Coal and Transportation Company (successor to the Corwin Trading Company), and her official home port was listed as Boston. Captain West returned as Master from 1902 to 1910; his wife Gertrude sailed with him as Ship's Clerk. Most of the crew were Eskimo (they were less likely to desert the ship to go prospecting), and the kitchen staff were Chinese. The Corwin held daily fire drills, and was equipped with wireless since the 1904 refit. In 1911 and 1912, the Corwin was listed as a ship of the Western Alaska Steamship Company. In 1913, her home port was listed as Seattle and her owner as Ben Moyses.

=== Attempted Karluk rescue ===
In 1914, a wealthy Nome mine-owner and businessman, Jafet Lindeberg, chartered the Corwin (Captain R.J. Healy) from the Kotzebue Transportation and Trading Company to attempt a rescue the Karluk survivors from Wrangel Island. She reached Wrangel Island one day after the survivors had been rescued by Olaf Swenson and his crew in the King & Winge. She then proceeded to look for four missing members of Karluk's crew, circling Herald Island without seeing any sign of the missing men. The Corwin struck a reef off Cape Douglas on her return trip and went hard aground. She was refloated by jettisoning and lightering supplies to lighten ship, with assistance from the USRC Bear and a crew from the Nome Lifesaving station.

=== Ultimate fate ===
By 1916, the Corwin was majority-owned by Schubach & Hamilton, who sold her to Mexican owners. She burned in drydock at Salina Cruz that same year.

== Legacy ==
Several places in Alaska and Yukon are named for the Corwin, including Corwin Bluff (the bluff near Cape Lisburne containing the Corwin Coal Mine), Corwin Rock in the Aleutian Islands, and possibly Cape Corwin on Nunivak Island. Kivalina lagoon was called Corwin Lagoon by the United States Coast and Geodetic Survey from 1884 to about 1950. The Corwin Cliffs in the Saint Elias Mountains, Yukon were named for the Corwin by I.C Russell in 1890.

A contemporaneous model of the Corwin built by Captain Thomas Mountain is in the collection of the Oregon State Historical Society and was displayed at the Alaska State Museum in 2006.

== See also ==
- European and American voyages of scientific exploration
