= Edgar C. Merriman =

U.S. Navy officer

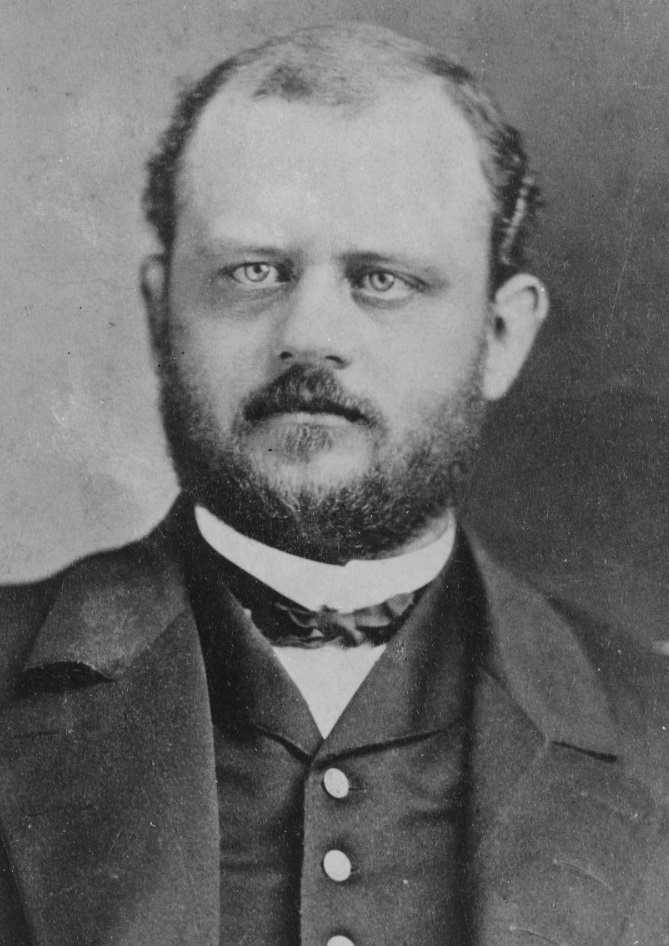
Merriman in 1866, while serving aboard USS Wateree

Edgar C. Merriman (20 July 1840 – 11 December 1894) was an officer in the United States Navy who served as the naval commander of the Department of Alaska from October 4, 1882 to September 13, 1883, while commanding USS Adams.

Merriman was born in Bradford, New York on July 20, 1840, the son of Horam and Adeliza (Munson) Merriman). he was educated in the local schools and attended Norwich University from 1854 to 1856.

In September 1857, Merriman began attendance at the United States Naval Academy. He resigned in November 1860 because he believed he was dying of tuberculosis. His illness was not fatal, so he joined the Union Navy for the American Civil War in December 1861 and was appointed acting master. He was promoted to lieutenant in July 1862 and served until the end of the war. He remained in the United States Navy after the war and was promoted lieutenant commander in July 1866, commander in March 1875, and captain in July 1890. Merriman retired in September 1891, and was a resident of Yonkers, New York. In 1869, Merriman married Emily Craven, the daughter of Admiral Thomas T. Craven.

On 26 October 1882, Merriman was in command of the forces that destroyed Angoon, Alaska, in the Angoon Bombardment.

Merriman died in Yonkers on December 11, 1894. He was buried at Glenwood Cemetery in Geneva, New York.
