= Wrangell Cooperative Association =

Alaska Native tribe

Wrangell Cooperative Association Shtaxʼhéen Ḵwáan (Tlingit)
- Alaska Native village
- Wrangell Cooperative Association
- Coordinates: 56°28′15″N 132°22′56″W
- Constitution Ratified: April 30, 1942; 84 years ago
- Capital: Wrangell, Alaska

Government
  - Type: Representative democracy
  - Body: Wrangell Tribal Council
  - President: Edward Rilatos

Population (2025)
  - Estimate: 600
- Demonym: Tlingit
- Time zone: UTC– 09:00 (AKST)
  - Summer (DST): UTC– 08:00 (AKDT)
- Website: www.wcatribe.org

The Wrangell Cooperative Association is a federally recognized Native American tribe of Tlingit people. This Alaska Native tribe is headquartered in Wrangell, Alaska.

They have more than 600 enrolled citizens.

== Government ==
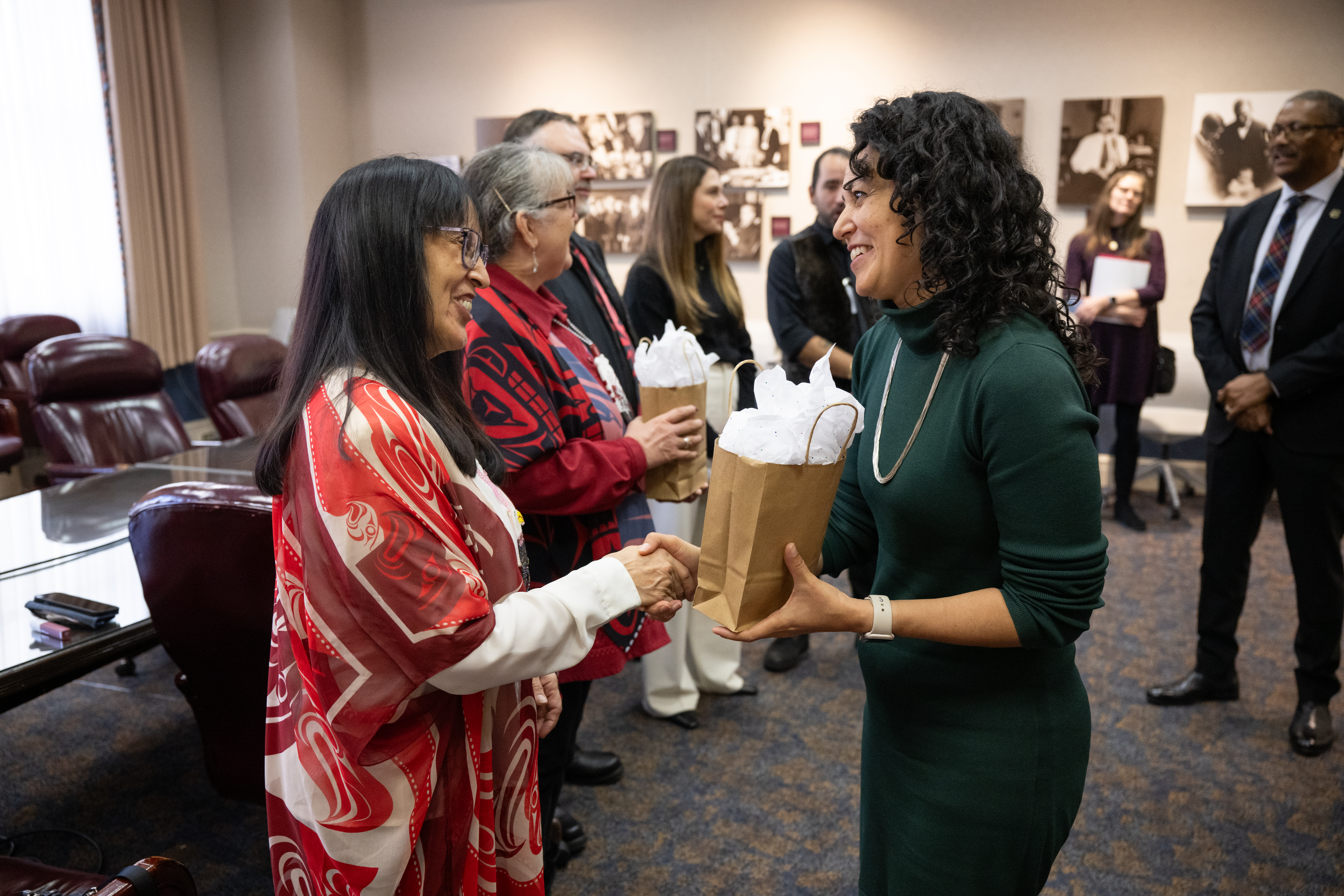
Wrangell Cooperative Association representatives meet with USDA Deputy Secretary Xochitl Torres Small, 2024

The Wrangell Cooperative Association is led by a democratically elected tribal council. Their president is Edward Rilatos. The Alaska Regional Office of the Bureau of Indian Affairs serves the tribe.

The tribe first ratified their constitution in 1942 and corporate charter in 1947. They are served by the Alaska Regional Office of the Bureau of Indian Affairs.

== Location ==
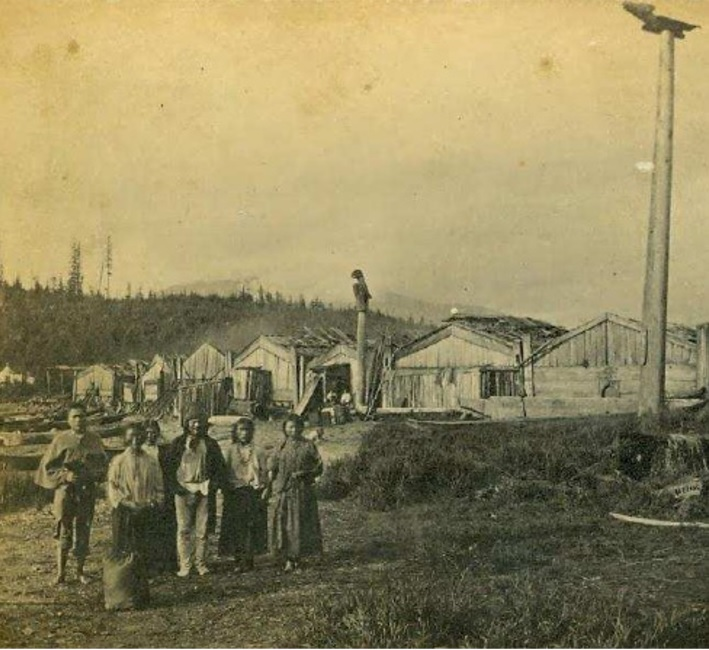
Village of Wrangell (Tlingit: Ḵaachx̱ana.áakʼw) in 1868, present-day Front Street

The tribe is located near the mouth of the Stikine River in Wrangell Harbor on Chief Shakes Island, which is home to the Chief Shakes Historic Site that houses a recreated 19th-century Tlingit clan house.

In addition to Shakes Island, the tribe also manages the Wrangell Cultural Center and Totem Park.

== Economic development ==
Wrangell Cooperative Association is developing its cultural tourism industry and has partnered with Paradise Advertising to expand its reach.

== Language ==
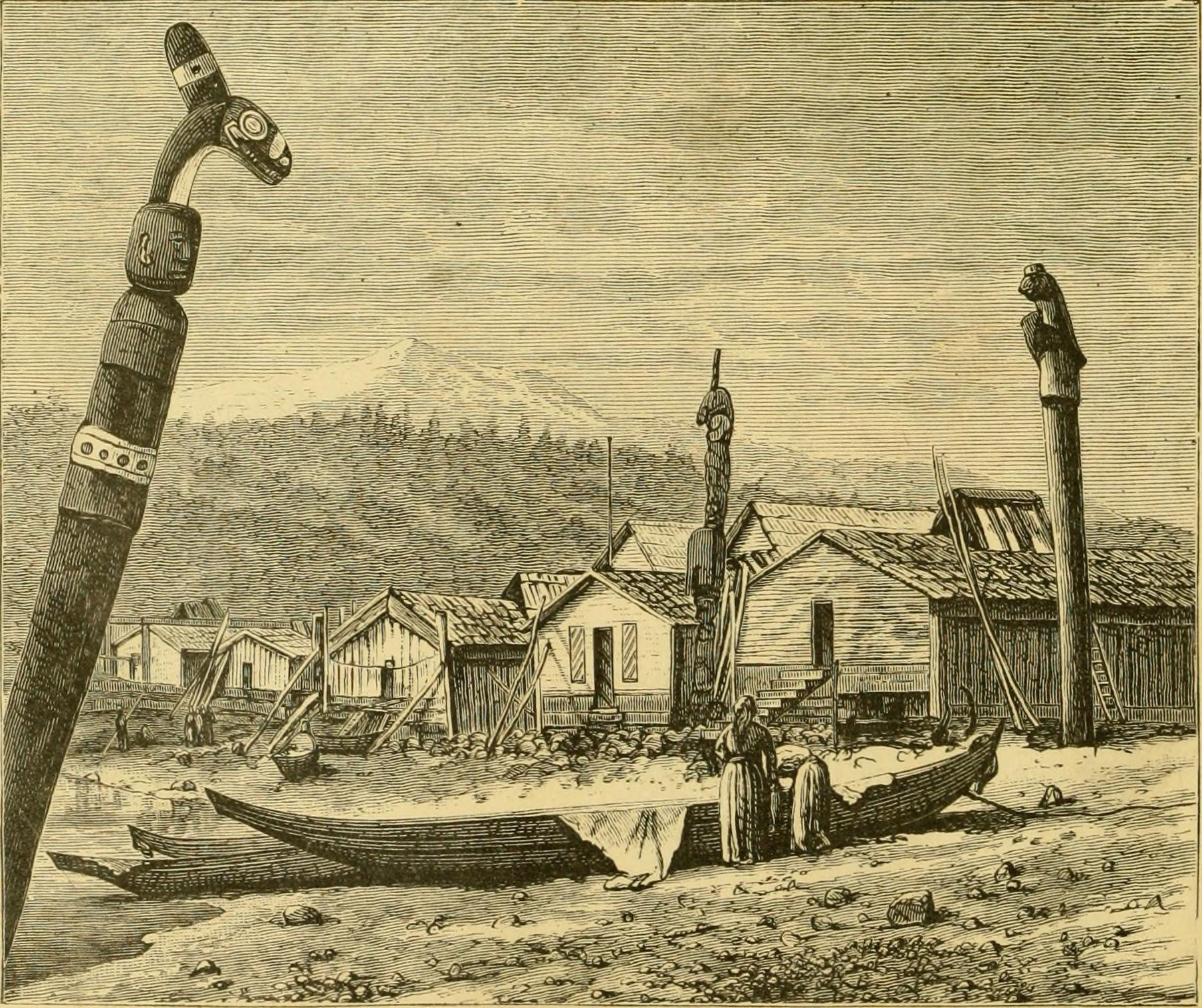
Lithograph of the Stikine village at Fort Wrangell, Alaska, c. 1880

The tribe speaks English and the Tlingit language.

== See also ==
- Wrangell Bombardment, 1869 attack by U.S. Army
