= Angoon, Alaska =

City in Alaska, United States

Angoon, Alaska Aangóon
- City
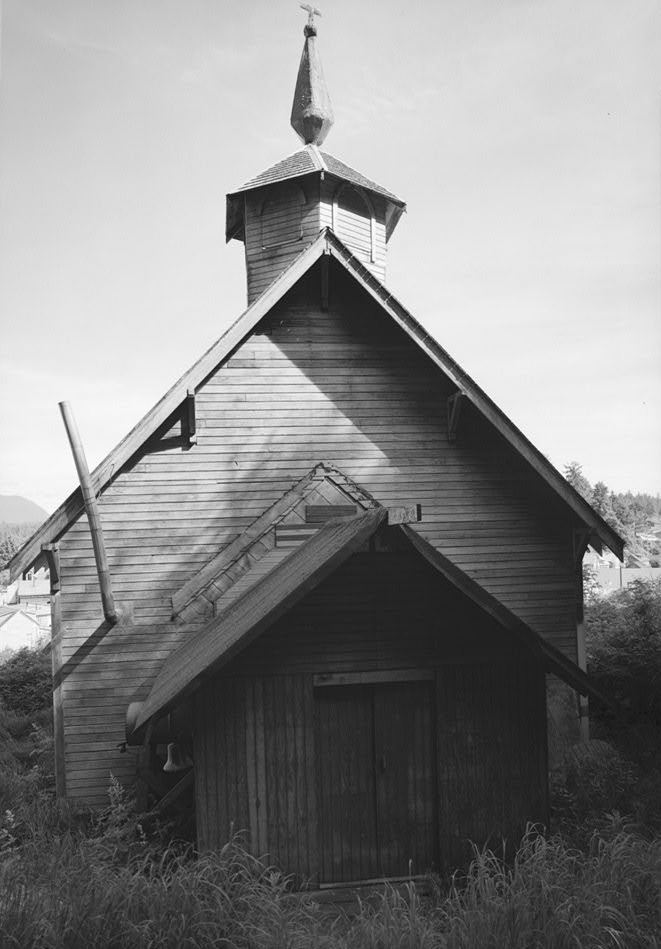
- St. John the Baptist Russian Orthodox Church, Angoon

- Emblem

- Location in Alaska
- Coordinates: 57°29′49″N 134°34′25″W
- Country: United States
- State: Alaska
- Census Area: Hoonah-Angoon
- Incorporated: May 7, 1963

Government
  - Mayor: Peter Duncan
  - State senator: Bert Stedman (R)
  - State rep.: Rebecca Himschoot (I)

Area
  - Total: 38.97 sq mi (100.93 km^{2})
  - Land: 24.53 sq mi (63.54 km^{2})
  - Water: 14.44 sq mi (37.39 km^{2})
- Elevation: 23 ft (7 m)

Population (2020)
  - Total: 357
  - Density: 14.6/sq mi (5.62/km^{2})
- Time zone: UTC-9 (Alaska)
  - Summer (DST): UTC-8 (Alaska)
- ZIP code: 99820
- Area code: 907
- FIPS code: 02-03440
- GNIS feature ID: 1420113
- Website: cityofangoon.org

Angoon (sometimes formerly spelled Angun, Tlingit: Aangóon) is a city on Admiralty Island, Alaska, United States. As of the 2020 census, Angoon had a population of 357. For statistical purposes, it is in the Hoonah-Angoon Census Area.

The name in Tlingit, Aangóon, means roughly "isthmus town." It is the headquarters of the Angoon Community Association, a federally recognized tribe of Tlingit people.

== History ==
Admiralty Island has long been the home of the Kootznoowoo Tlingit people (Tlingit: Xootsnoowú Ḵwáan), who are enrolled in the Angoon Community Association. Kootznoowoo means "fortress of brown bears", literally xoots-noow-ú "brown.bear-fortress-possessive". Angoon has a less-rainy climate than most of southeastern Alaska and was valued by the Tlingit for that reason.

During the Russian period in Alaska, from the 18th century to the mid-19th century, maritime fur trading was a major economic activity in the area.

In 1878, after the 1867 Alaska Purchase, the North West Trading Company established a trading post and whaling station on nearby Killisnoo Island and employed Angoon villagers to hunt whales. Whaling, a school, and a Russian Orthodox church attracted many Tlingits to neighboring Killisnoo.

In October 1882, the village was destroyed in the Angoon Bombardment by US Naval forces under the command Commander Edgar C. Merriman and the USRC Thomas Corwin under the command of Michael A. Healy. The Tlingit villagers had taken white hostages and property and demanded two hundred blankets in compensation from the North West Trading Company following the accidental death of a Tlingit shaman who died in a whaling bomb accident while working on the whaler. The hostages were released upon the arrival of the naval expedition to Angoon, however Merriman demanded four hundred blankets in tribute and upon the Tlingit delivery of just eighty one blankets, Merriman's forces destroyed the village.

After a short time, the North West Trading Company switched to herring processing. During this time, many Tlingits moved to Killisnoo for employment at the fish plant. In 1928, Killisnoo was destroyed by fire and many Tlingits returned to Angoon.

In 1973, Angoon won a U.S. $90,000 settlement from the United States government for the 1882 bombardment.

== Geography ==
Angoon is located on the west side of Admiralty Island at 57°29′49″N 134°34′25″W (57.496891, -134.573579). It is the largest permanent settlement on Admiralty Island and is sited on an isthmus at the mouth of Kootznahoo Inlet on the west side of the island. It is 60 miles (97 km) southwest of Juneau. The only other community on the island is Cube Cove, to the north.

According to the United States Census Bureau, the city has a total area of 38.8 square miles (100.4 km^{2}), of which 24.4 square miles (63.2 km^{2}) are land and 14.4 square miles (37.2 km^{2}), or 37.04%, are water.

=== Climate ===
The climate is either an oceanic climate (Köppen climate classification: Cfb), when utilising the −3 °C or 26.6 °F isotherm or a warm-summer humid continental climate (Köppen climate classification: Dfb), when utilising the 0 °C or 32 °F isotherm. Its climate moderately tempered by the Alaska Current is only slightly more extreme than the north of Scotland.

Climate data for Angoon
Month	Jan	Feb	Mar	Apr	May	Jun	Jul	Aug	Sep	Oct	Nov	Dec	Year
Record high °F (°C)	57 (14)	57 (14)	58 (14)	64 (18)	71 (22)	80 (27)	82 (28)	77 (25)	75 (24)	62 (17)	57 (14)	50 (10)	82 (28)
Mean daily maximum °F (°C)	31.9 (−0.1)	36.8 (2.7)	40.9 (4.9)	47.1 (8.4)	53.4 (11.9)	58.8 (14.9)	62 (17)	61.5 (16.4)	56.6 (13.7)	48.4 (9.1)	39.9 (4.4)	34.3 (1.3)	47.6 (8.7)
Mean daily minimum °F (°C)	23.5 (−4.7)	27.1 (−2.7)	29.7 (−1.3)	33.9 (1.1)	39.8 (4.3)	45.6 (7.6)	49.8 (9.9)	49.8 (9.9)	45.2 (7.3)	39.1 (3.9)	32.3 (0.2)	27.3 (−2.6)	36.9 (2.7)
Record low °F (°C)	−3 (−19)	−7 (−22)	0 (−18)	20 (−7)	29 (−2)	36 (2)	40 (4)	40 (4)	30 (−1)	16 (−9)	−2 (−19)	−6 (−21)	−7 (−22)
Average precipitation inches (mm)	3.39 (86)	2.7 (69)	2.42 (61)	2.21 (56)	1.92 (49)	1.9 (48)	2.26 (57)	3.76 (96)	4.89 (124)	7.71 (196)	4.79 (122)	4.04 (103)	42 (1,100)
Average snowfall inches (cm)	16.6 (42)	12.7 (32)	8.1 (21)	2 (5.1)	0 (0)	0 (0)	0 (0)	0 (0)	0 (0)	0.3 (0.76)	6 (15)	15.4 (39)	61.2 (155)
Average precipitation days	17	16	16	15	16	15	13	15	18	23	20	21	205
Source: WRCC

== Demographics ==
Historical population
Census	Pop.	Note	%±
1880	420		—
1890	381		−9.3%
1920	114		—
1930	319		179.8%
1940	342		7.2%
1950	429		25.4%
1960	395		−7.9%
1970	400		1.3%
1980	465		16.3%
1990	638		37.2%
2000	572		−10.3%
2010	459		−19.8%
2020	357		−22.2%
U.S. Decennial Census

Angoon first appeared on the 1880 U.S. Census as the native village of "Augoon" with 420 residents, all members of the Tlingit tribe. The area returned as "Hoochinoo" (AKA Kootznahoo) in 1890. Angoon did not appear again on the census until 1920. It has appeared on every successive census to date as of 2010, and incorporated as a city in 1963.

=== 2020 census ===
As of the 2020 census, Angoon had a population of 357. The median age was 42.3 years. 25.2% of residents were under the age of 18 and 18.2% of residents were 65 years of age or older. For every 100 females there were 110.0 males, and for every 100 females age 18 and over there were 122.5 males age 18 and over.

0.0% of residents lived in urban areas, while 100.0% lived in rural areas.

There were 130 households in Angoon, of which 39.2% had children under the age of 18 living in them. Of all households, 36.2% were married-couple households, 29.2% were households with a male householder and no spouse or partner present, and 26.2% were households with a female householder and no spouse or partner present. About 21.5% of all households were made up of individuals and 9.2% had someone living alone who was 65 years of age or older.

There were 192 housing units, of which 32.3% were vacant. The homeowner vacancy rate was 0.0% and the rental vacancy rate was 20.0%.

Racial composition as of the 2020 census
Race	Number	Percent
White	25	7.0%
Black or African American	0	0.0%
American Indian and Alaska Native	286	80.1%
Asian	6	1.7%
Native Hawaiian and Other Pacific Islander	1	0.3%
Some other race	3	0.8%
Two or more races	36	10.1%
Hispanic or Latino (of any race)	25	7.0%

=== 2000 census ===
As of the census of 2000, there were 572 people, 184 households, and 138 families residing in the city. The population density was 25.4 people per square mile (9.8/km^{2}). There were 221 housing units at an average density of 9.8 per square mile (3.8/km^{2}). The racial makeup of the city was 81.99% Native American, 11.36% White, 5.42% of the population were Hispanic or Latino of any race, 0.52% Black or African American, 0.17% Asian, 1.40% from other races, and 4.55% from two or more races.

Of the 184 households, 42.4% had children under the age of 18 living with them, 49.5% were married couples living together, 17.4% had a female householder with no husband present, and 25.0% were non-families. 22.3% of all households were made up of individuals, and 2.7% had someone living alone who was 65 years of age or older. The average household size was 3.11 and the average family size was 3.64.

In the city, the age distribution of the population shows 34.8% under the age of 18, 8.6% from 18 to 24, 28.3% from 25 to 44, 21.9% from 45 to 64, and 6.5% who were 65 years of age or older. The median age was 32 years. For every 100 females, there were 110.3 males. For every 100 females age 18 and over, there were 115.6 males.

The median income for a household in the city was $29,861, and the median income for a family was $31,429. Males had a median income of $21,250 versus $30,625 for females. The per capita income for the city was $11,357. About 27.0% of families and 27.9% of the population were below the poverty line, including 39.1% of those under age 18 and 20.0% of those age 65 or over.

== Government ==
Angoon is a second-class city, and uses a Mayor-Council form of government.

== Economy ==
Fishing and fish processing are the mainstays of the economy at Angoon now.

Angoon is looking into non-diesel electric power generation to reduce local electric bills.

== Education ==
Chatham School District operates two schools:

- Angoon Elementary School
- Angoon High School
