= Chatham Strait =

Narrow passage of the Alexander Archipelago in Alaska

- Shee ya xhaak
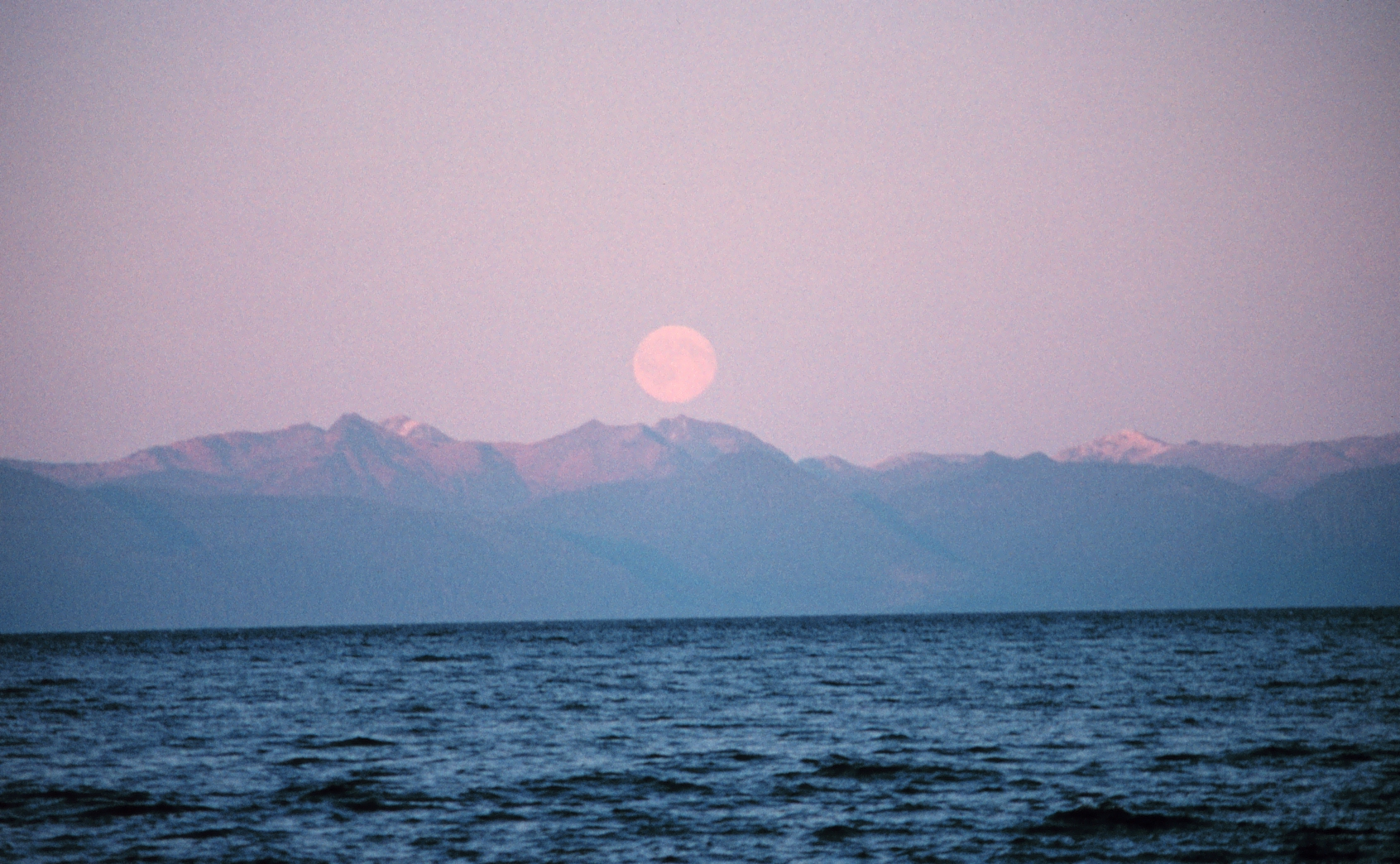
- Moonrise in Chatham Strait

- Location within Alaska
- Location: Alexander Archipelago
- Coordinates: 56°57′54″N 134°37′32″W
- Max. length: 150 miles (240 km)
- Max. width: 16 km (9.9 mi)

Chatham Strait, or Shee ya xhaak in the Tlingit language, is a narrow passage of the Alexander Archipelago in the southeastern region of the U.S. state of Alaska. It separates Chichagof Island and Baranof Island to its west from Admiralty Island and Kuiu Island on its east.

It is 150 miles (240 km) long and extends southward from the junction of Icy Strait and Lynn Canal to the open sea. The strait is deep and 5–16 km (3.1–9.9 mi) wide.

== Naming ==
The meanings of the parts of the name in the Tlingit language for Chatham Strait are as follows: Shee, Baranof Island; Ya, face; Xhaak, Center. The southern part of the strait was named Ensenada del Principe in 1775 by Juan Francisco de la Bodega y Quadra. In 1786, La Perouse gave it the name Tschirikow Bay, and in 1789, the fur trader James Colnett named it Christian Sound. Other early fur traders called it Menzies Strait. It received its present name in 1794 when George Vancouver named it Chatham Strait in honor of William Pitt, 1st Earl of Chatham. Chatham Sound, further south in British Columbia, was named by Vancouver for his son John Pitt, 2nd Earl of Chatham, whose brother William Pitt, was Prime Minister of Great Britain.
