= Killisnoo, Alaska =

Unincorporated community in the state of Alaska, United States

Killisnoo Kenasnoow
- Unincorporated community
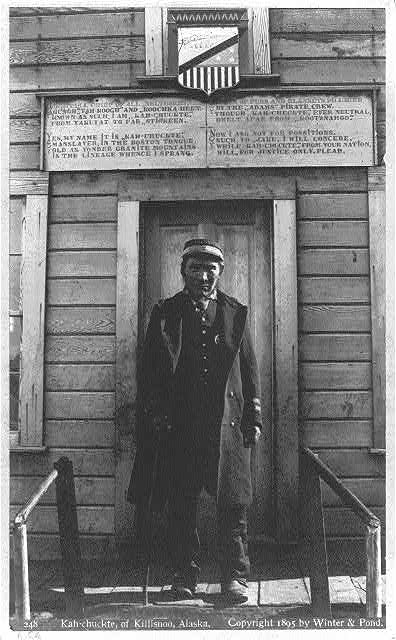
- Chief of Neltusken

- Location in Alaska
- Coordinates: 57°28′10″N 134°34′11″W
- Country: United States
- State: Alaska
- Census Area: Hoonah-Angoon

Government
  - State senator: Bert Stedman (R)
  - State rep.: Jonathan Kreiss-Tomkins (D)
- Elevation: 16 ft (4.9 m)
- Time zone: UTC-9 (Alaska)
  - Summer (DST): UTC-8 (Alaska)
- GNIS ID: 1423064

Killisnoo (Tlingit: Kenasnoow) was an unincorporated community on Killisnoo Island in the Hoonah-Angoon Census Area in the U.S. state of Alaska, near Angoon, Admiralty Island. Killisnoo had a post office until it closed in 1930. The community was known by several alternative names, including Kanas-nu, Kanasnu, Kenasnow and Killishoo.

== History ==
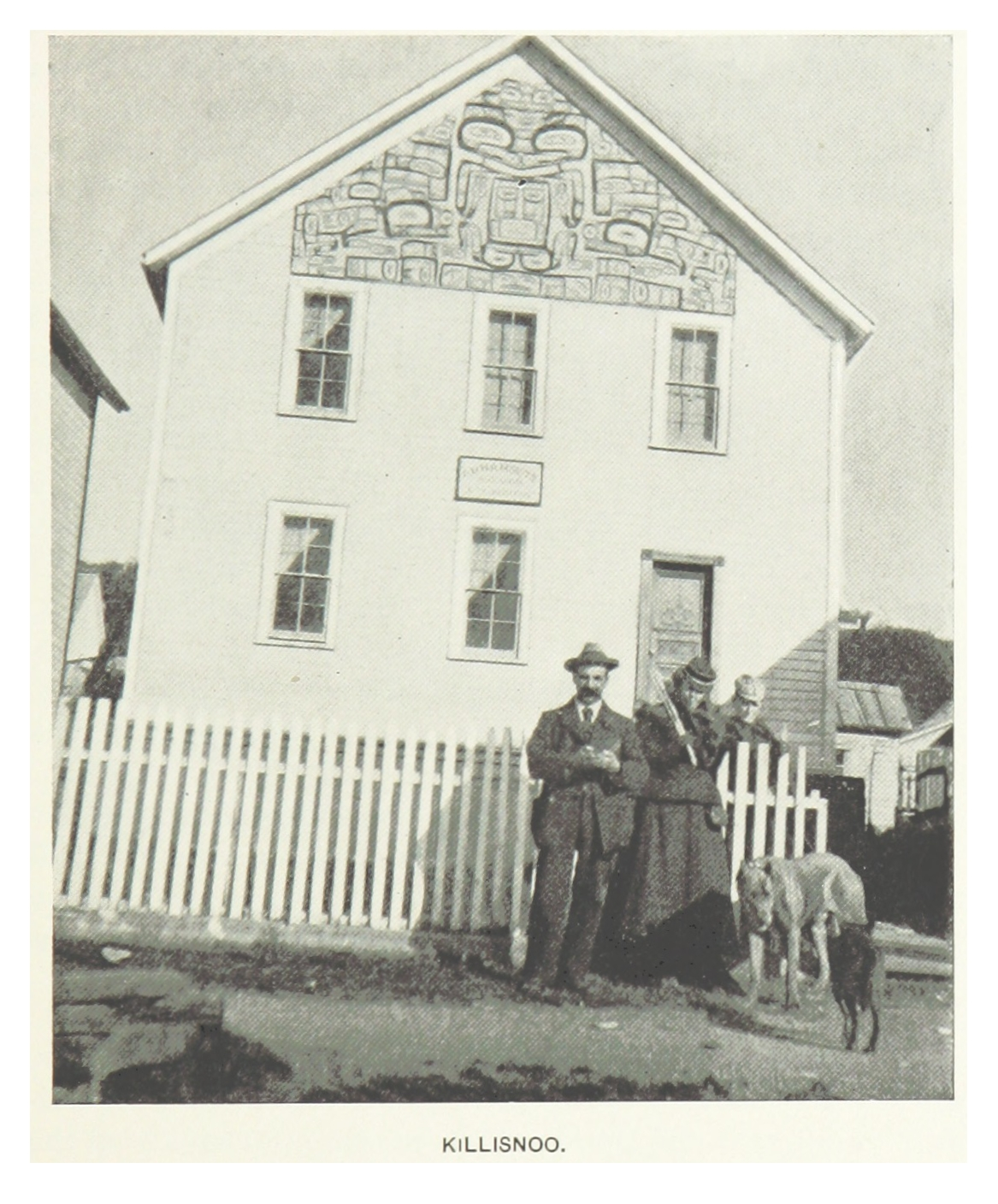
Killisnoo, 1898

Killisnoo Island has long been inhabited by Tlingit people. In the late 1800s, the North West Trading Company built a fish processing plant at Killisnoo and many Tlingit moved from nearby Angoon and other areas to Killisnoo to work at the plant. The plant was destroyed in a fire in 1928 and most of the residents left Killisnoo.

The St. Andrew Church in Killisnoo was destroyed by fire in 1927, and the congregation built a new church called St. John the Baptist church in Angoon.

Like nearby Angoon, Killisnoo receives less rain than most of southeastern Alaska. Whaler's Cove Lodge is an active hunting and fishing lodge located on Killisnoo.

== Demographics ==
Historical population
Census	Pop.	Note	%±
1890	79		—
1900	172		117.7%
1910	351		104.1%
1920	256		−27.1%
1930	3		−98.8%
1940	26		766.7%
U.S. Decennial Census

Killisnoo first appeared on the 1890 U.S. Census as an unincorporated village of 79 residents. Although it was considered to be a Tlingit village, Whites outnumbered Tlingits by 44 to 33, with 2 Asians. It continued to appear until 1940, when most of the residents left. It was later annexed into the neighboring city of Angoon.

== External links and further reading ==
- A Russian American Photographer in Tlingit Country: Vincent Soboleff in Alaska by Sergei Kan, University of Oklahoma Press 2013, hardcover, 271 pages, 137 black and white photographs of people and scenes in Killisnoo and southeastern Alaska taken circa 1910, ISBN 9780806142906
  - "A Russian-American Photographing Native Alaska" illustrated review by Maurice Berger in the photography blog "Lens" in The New York Times July 17, 2013
