= Philosophy and religion of the Tlingit =

The philosophy and religion of the Tlingit, although never formally codified, was historically a fairly well organized philosophical and religious system whose basic axioms shaped the way all Tlingit people viewed and interacted with the world around them. Between 1886 and 1895, in the face of their shamans' inability to treat Old World diseases, including smallpox, many Tlingit people converted to Orthodox Christianity. It has been argued that they saw Eastern Orthodox Christianity as a way of resisting assimilation to the "American way of life", which was associated with Presbyterianism. Russian Orthodox missionaries had translated their liturgy into the Tlingit language. After Christianization, the Tlingit belief system began to erode.

Today, some young Tlingits look back towards what their traditional tribal religions and worldview for inspiration, security, and a sense of identity. While many elders converted, contemporary Tlingit "reconcile Christianity and the 'traditional culture.'"

== Dualism ==
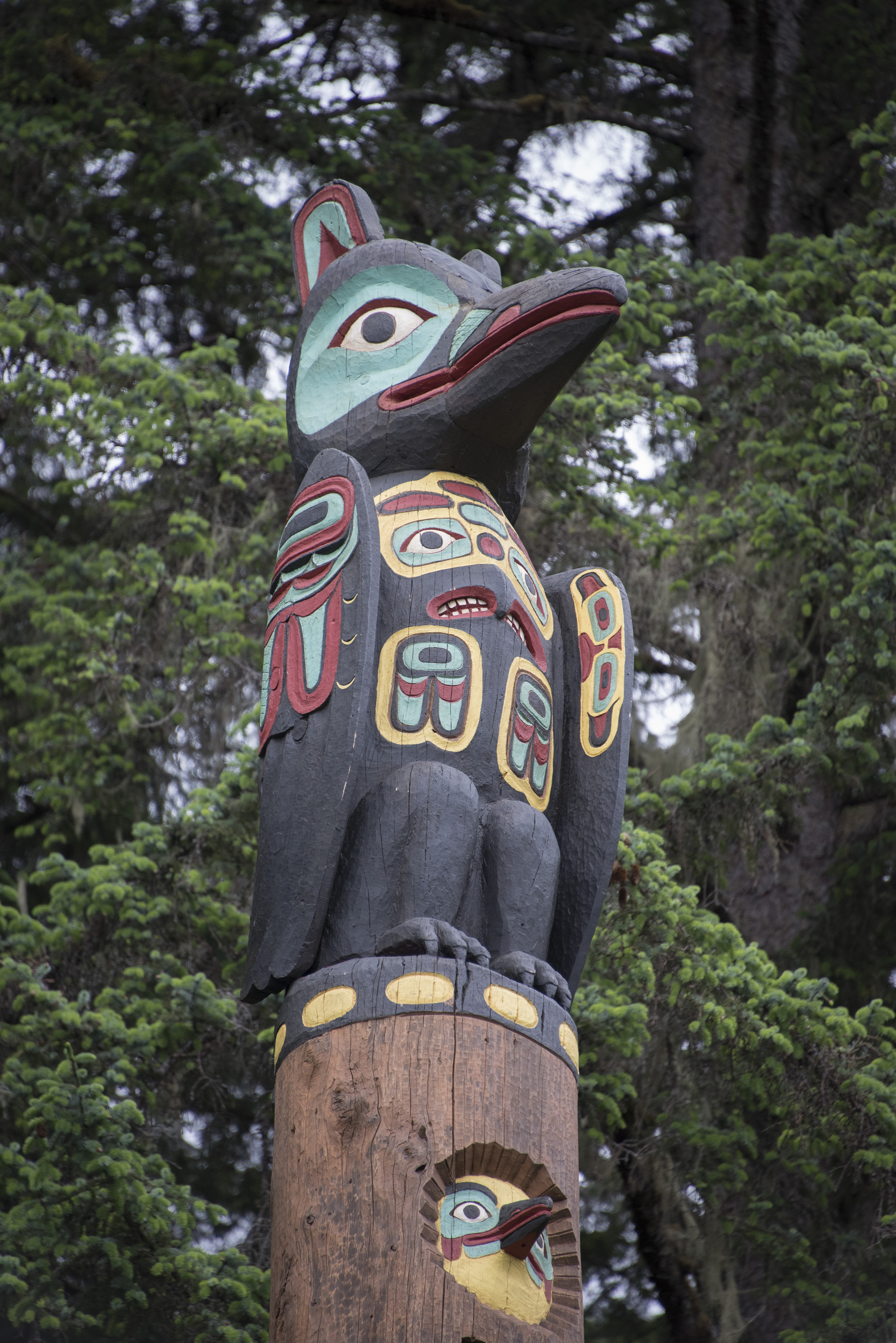
Yaxté totem pole, a Tlingit totem pole in Juneau, Alaska.

The Tlingit see the world as a system of dichotomies. The most obvious is the division between the light water and the dark forest which surrounds their daily lives in the Tlingit homeland.

Water serves as a primary means of transportation, and as a source of most Tlingit foods. Its surface is flat and broad, and most dangers on the water are readily perceived by the naked eye. Light reflects brightly off the sea, and it is one of the first things that a person in Southeast Alaska sees when they look outside. Like all things, danger lurks beneath its surface, but these dangers are for the most part easily avoided with some caution and planning. For such reasons it is considered a relatively safe and reliable place, and thus represents the apparent forces of the Tlingit world.

In contrast, the dense rainforest of Southeast Alaska is dark and misty in even the brightest summer weather. Dangers from bears, falling trees, dank muskeg, and the risk of being lost all make the forest a constantly dangerous place. Vision in the forest is poor, reliable landmarks are few, and food is scarce in comparison to the seashore. Entering the forest always means traveling uphill, often up the sides of steep mountains, and clear trails are rare to nonexistent. Thus, the forest represents the hidden forces in the Tlingit world.

Another series of dichotomies in Tlingit thought are wet versus dry, heat versus cold, and hard versus soft. A wet, cold climate causes people to seek warm, dry shelter. The traditional Tlingit house, with its solid red cedar construction and blazing central fireplace, represented an ideal Tlingit conception of warmth, hardness, and dryness. Contrast the soggy forest floor that is covered with soft rotten trees and moist, squishy moss, both of which make for uncomfortable habitation. Three attributes that Tlingits value in a person are hardness, dryness, and heat. These can be perceived in many different ways, such as the hardness of strong bones or the hardness of a firm will; the heat given off by a healthy living man, or the heat of a passionate feeling; the dryness of clean skin and hair, or the sharp dry scent of cedar.

== Spirituality ==
The Tlingit divide the living being into several components:

- k̲aa daa — body, physical being, person's outside (cf. aas daayí "tree's bark or outside")
  - k̲aa daadleeyí — the flesh of the body (< daa + dleey "meat, flesh")
  - k̲aa ch'áatwu — skin
  - k̲aa s'aaghí — bones
- x̲'aséikw — vital force, breath (< disaa "to breathe")
- k̲aa toowú — mind, thought and feelings
- k̲aa yahaayí — soul, shadow
- k̲aa yakghwahéiyagu — ghost, revenant
  - s'igheekháawu — ghost in a cemetery

The physical components are those that have no proper life after death. The skin is viewed as the covering around the insides of the body, which are divided roughly into bones and flesh. The flesh decays quickly, and in most cases has little spiritual value, but the bones form an essential part of the Tlingit spiritual belief system. Bones are the hard and dry remains of something which has died, and thus are the physical reminder of that being after its death. In the case of animals, it is essential that the bones be properly handled and disposed, since mishandling may displease the spirit of the animal and may prevent it from being reincarnated. The reason for the spirit's displeasure is rather obvious, since a salmon who was resurrected without a jaw or tail would certainly refuse to run again in the stream where it had died.

The significant bones in a human body are the backbone and the eight "long bones" of the limbs. The eight long bones are emphasized because that number has spiritual significance in Tlingit culture. The bones of a cremated body must be collected and placed with those of the person's clan ancestors, or else the person's spirit might be disadvantaged or displeased in the afterlife, which could cause repercussions if the ghost decided to haunt people or if the person was reincarnated.

The source of living can be found in xh'aséikw, the essence of life. This bears some resemblance to the Chinese concept of qi as a metaphysical energy without which a thing is not alive; however in Tlingit thought, this can be equated to the breath as well. For example, the shaman's simplest test for whether a person is alive is to hold a downy feather above the mouth or nose; if the feather is disturbed then the person is breathing and alive, even if the breath is not audible or sensible. This then implies that the person still maintains x̲'aséikw.

The feelings and thoughts of a person are encompassed by the k̲aa toowú. This is a very basic idea in Tlingit culture. When a Tlingit references their mind or feelings, he always discusses this in terms of ax̲ toowú, "my mind". Thus "Ax̲ toowú yanéekw", "I am sad", literally "My mind is pained".

Both x̲'aséikw and k̲aa toowú are mortal, and cease to exist upon the death of a being. However, the k̲aa yahaayí and k̲aa yakghwahéiyagu are immortal and persist in various forms after death. The idea of k̲aa yahaayí is that it is the person's essence, shadow, or reflection. It can even refer to the appearance of a person in a photograph or painting, and is metaphorically used to refer to the behavior or appearance of a person as other than what he is or should be.

== Death and the afterlife ==
Heat, dryness, and hardness are represented as parts of the Tlingit practice of cremation. The body is burned, removing water under great heat, and leaving behind the hard bones. The soul is said to go on to be near the heat of the great bonfire in the house in the spirit world, unless it is not cremated in which case it is said to be relegated to a place near the door with the cold winds. The hardest part of the spirit, the most physical part, is said to be reincarnated into a clan descendant.

== Shamanism ==
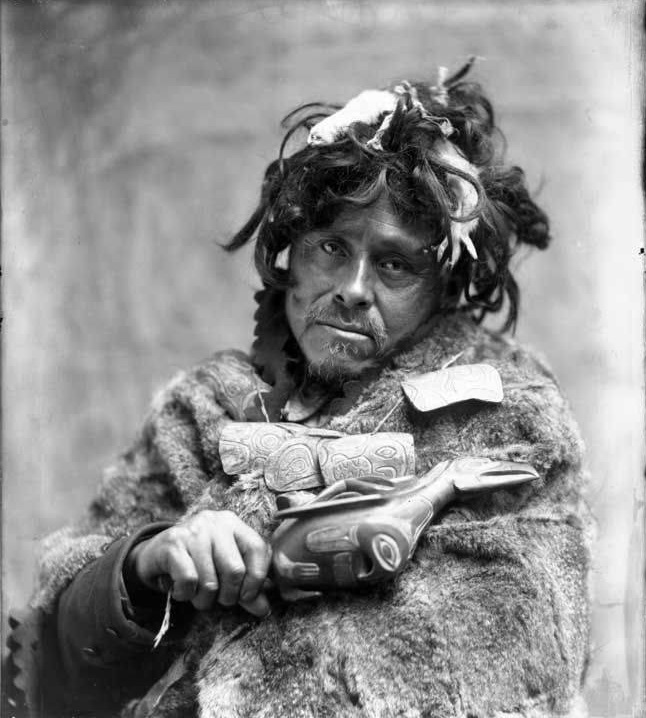
Tlingit Shaman, ca. 1900. Portrait of man wearing fur cape and carved amulet necklace, holding raven rattle

The shaman is called ixht'. He was called upon to heal the sick, to drive out those who practiced witchcraft, and to use the power of their spirits against enemies in wartime.

It is a misnomer to call him "witch doctor" as the practices of the ixht' and the "witch" are completely different. To call one a medicine man is not correct either as "medicine master" is naak'w s'aati, which is the Tlingit term for a witch.

The name of the ixht' and his songs and stories of his visions are the property of the clan he belongs to. He would seek spirit helpers from various animals and after fasting for four days when the animal would 'stand up in front of him' before entering him he would obtain the spirit. The tongue of the animal would be cut out and added to his collection of spirit helpers. This is why he was referred to by some as "the spirit man".

Future shamans would be chosen before their birth by the elders of a Tlingit community. The elders knew about people and what they would be before they were born. The boy training to become a shaman would be told how to approach the grave and how to handle the objects. Touching shaman objects was strictly forbidden except to a shaman and his helpers. In fact, the elders had a word solely for the instance when a child tried to touch or play with a shaman's objects. The word carried a heavy tone and that was all that needed to be said.

All shamans are gone from the Tlingit today and their practices will likely never be revived, although shaman spirit songs are still done in their ceremonies, and their stories re-told at those times.

== Kushtakas ==
The Kushtaka (kû'cta-qa) are the feared Land Otter People, human from the waist up, and otter-like below. Land otters are good fishers. Those who are drowned are said to often marry (and become) land otters, and it is said land otters can assist in drownings. Land otters are potentially harmful. When properly controlled; however, the land otter can help fishermen who penetrate the sacred realm beyond social boundaries. Those drowned and married to land otters (and their land otter children) can return to their human relations and assist them, usually by helping them catch abundant supplies of seafood. The land otters can only eat raw food, for if they eat cooked fish they will die; and as supernatural beings, after being out on the water they must regain land and find shelter before the raven calls or they will die.

Those that drown and are saved by the Kushtaka are known as Kushtakakhaa. They live with the Kushtaka, but because they were once human, they travel back to their old communities now and again. Except now, as Kushtakakhaa, they have the power to sway people's minds and shape shift.
