= North West Trading Company =

Trading company organized in Oregon in 1879

The North West Trading Company was organized in Portland, Oregon, United States in 1879 by Paul Schulze and Henry Villard in order to do business in Alaska. It established a trading post at Killisnoo in 1878; this soon grew to include a fish processing plant at the same site, the first one of its kind in the developing Alaska Territory for nearly forty years. Due to numerous factors, including a mild recession (including Grant's Panic of 1884), rapid expansion of the company, and the uncertain nature of railway markets, the company went into receivership in 1888 and the trading station was sold to Alaska Oil and Guano.
