= Hasselborg =

Hasselborg may refer to:

== People ==
- Anna Hasselborg (born 1989), Swedish female curler, 2018 Winter Olympics champion in women's curling
- Marcus Hasselborg (born 1986), Swedish male curler
- Maria Hasselborg (Mio) (born 1980), Swedish female curler
- Mikael Hasselborg (born 1954), Swedish male curler and coach
- Stefan Hasselborg (born 1949), Swedish male curler and coach

== Places ==
- Hasselborg Cabin (Hasselborg Creek Cabin), backcountry shelter in the Admiralty Island National Monument, part of Tongass National Forest in Southeast Alaska
  - Hasselborg Lake North Shelter Cabin
  - Hasselborg Lake East Shelter Cabin
  - Hasselborg Lake South Shelter Cabin
