= King Salmon River (Admiralty Island) =

- Location of the mouth of the King Salmon River in Alaska

Location
- Country: United States
- State: Alaska
- Census Area: Hoonah–Angoon

Physical characteristics
- Source: Admiralty Island
  - location: Kootznoowoo Wilderness, Admiralty Island National Monument
  - coordinates: 58°03′41″N 134°32′22″W
  - elevation: 2,847 ft (868 m)
- Mouth: King Salmon Bay, Seymour Canal
  - location: 18 miles (29 km) south of Juneau
  - coordinates: 58°02′31″N 134°20′27″W
  - elevation: 10 ft (3.0 m)
- Length: 11 mi (18 km)

The King Salmon River is a small stream on the northern tip of Admiralty Island of Southeast Alaska, United States.

It flows eastward then south for a total distance of 11 miles (18 km) from headwaters in the low mountains just south of Eagle Peak into King Salmon Bay of the Seymour Canal. Its entire course lies within Kootznoowoo Wilderness of the Admiralty Island National Monument.

A relatively small river, it is not navigable. Besides its namesake king salmon, the river hosts a large annual run of pink salmon.

== See also ==
- List of rivers of Alaska
