= Thayer House =

Thayer House may refer to:

in the United States (by state then city)

- Thayer Lake East Shelter Cabin, Angoon, Alaska, listed on the National Register of Historic Places (NRHP) in Hoonah–Angoon Census Area
- Thayer Lake North Shelter Cabin, Angoon, Alaska, NRHP-listed in Hoonah–Angoon Census Area
- Thayer Lake South Shelter Cabin, Angoon, Alaska, NRHP-listed in Hoonah–Angoon Census Area
- Gen. Sylvanus Thayer House, Braintree, Massachusetts, listed on the NRHP in Norfolk County
- Nathaniel Thayer Estate, Lancaster, Massachusetts, listed on the NRHP in Worcester County
- Thayer House (Newton, Massachusetts), listed on the NRHP in Middlesex County
- H. Elmer Thayer House, Flint, Michigan, listed on the National Register of Historic Places in Genesee County
- Thayer House (Thompson Falls, Montana), listed on the National Register of Historic Places in Sanders County
- John M. Thayer House, Lincoln, Nebraska, listed on the National Register of Historic Places in Lancaster County
- Thayer Farmstead, Mexico, New York, listed on the NRHP in Oswego County
- Thayer Farm Site (31RD10), Asheboro, North Carolina, listed on the NRHP in Randolph County
- Thayer-Thompson House, Erie, Pennsylvania, listed on the NRHP in Erie County
