= Alexander Lake Shelter Cabin =

- U.S. National Register of Historic Places
- Alaska Heritage Resources Survey
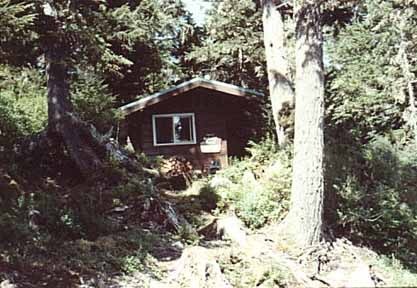

- Location within Alaska
- Location: Eastern end of Lake Alexander, Admiralty Island National Monument
- Nearest city: Angoon, Alaska
- Coordinates: 57°39′45″N 134°08′39″W
- Area: less than one acre
- Built: 1935
- Built by: Civilian Conservation Corps
- MPS: CCC Historic Properties in Alaska MPS
- NRHP reference No.: 95001296
- AHRS No.: SIT-363
- Added to NRHP: November 2, 1995

The Alexander Lake Shelter Cabin is a historic backcountry shelter in the Admiralty Island National Monument. It is located at the eastern tip of Lake Alexander, on the Admiralty Island Canoe Route. The cabin is a three-sided Adirondack log shelter made of peeled logs covered with wood shakes. It was constructed by a Civilian Conservation Corps crew in 1935, and received maintenance from the United States Forest Service as recently as 1980.

The cabin was listed on the National Register of Historic Places in 1995.

== See also ==
- National Register of Historic Places listings in Hoonah–Angoon Census Area, Alaska
