= Beaver Lake Dam =

- U.S. National Register of Historic Places
- Alaska Heritage Resources Survey
- Location within Alaska
- Location: Between Beaver Lake and Lake Alexander, Admiralty Island National Monument
- Nearest city: Angoon, Alaska
- Coordinates: 57°40′15″N 134°11′31″W
- Area: less than one acre
- Built: 1936
- Built by: Civilian Conservation Corps
- MPS: CCC Historic Properties in Alaska MPS
- NRHP reference No.: 95001295
- AHRS No.: SIT-362
- Added to NRHP: November 2, 1995

The Beaver Lake Dam, in Admiralty Island National Monument near Angoon, Alaska, is a Civilian Conservation Corps-built structure that was built in 1936. It was listed on the National Register of Historic Places in 1995.

It was designed as part of the Admiralty Island Civilian Conservation Corps Canoe Route to raise the level of Beaver Lake by about 3 feet (0.91 m) so that a channel between Beaver Lake and Lake Alexander could be traversed by canoes. As of 1992, the dam had deteriorated but still kept the level of the lake higher by a foot or more.

== See also ==
- National Register of Historic Places listings in Hoonah–Angoon Census Area, Alaska
