= National Register of Historic Places listings in Hoonah–Angoon Census Area, Alaska =

Location of the Hoonah-Angoon Census Area in Alaska

This is a list of the National Register of Historic Places listings in Hoonah–Angoon Census Area, Alaska.

This is intended to be a complete list of the properties and districts on the National Register of Historic Places in Hoonah-Angoon Census Area, Alaska, United States. The locations of National Register properties and districts for which the latitude and longitude coordinates are included below, may be seen in an online map.

There are 21 properties and districts listed on the National Register in the census area.

This National Park Service list is complete through NPS recent listings posted October 2, 2026.

== Current listings ==
	Name on the Register	Image	Date listed	Location	City or town	Description
1	Alexander Lake Shelter Cabin	Alexander Lake Shelter Cabin	November 2, 1995 (#95001296)	Eastern end of Lake Alexander, Admiralty Island National Monument; 57°39′45″N 134°08′39″W	Angoon	
2	Beaver Lake Dam		November 2, 1995 (#95001295)	Between Beaver Lake and Lake Alexander, Admiralty Island National Monument; 57°40′15″N 134°11′31″W	Angoon	
3	Big Shaheen Cabin	Big Shaheen Cabin	November 2, 1995 (#95001292)	On Hasselborg Lake, Admiralty Island National Monument; 57°42′04″N 134°16′42″W	Angoon	
4	Cape Spencer Lighthouse	Cape Spencer Lighthouse	December 4, 1975 (#75002160)	About 44 miles (71 km) west of Hoonah, at entrance of Cross Sound; 58°11′56″N 136°38′25″W	Elfin Cove	
5	Davidson Lake Shelter Cabin		November 2, 1995 (#95001303)	Western end of Davidson Lake, Admiralty Island National Monument; 57°36′15″N 134°22′48″W	Angoon	
6	Distin Lake Shelter Cabin	Distin Lake Shelter Cabin	November 2, 1995 (#95001294)	Northwestern shore of Distin Lake, Admiralty Island National Monument; 57°37′46″N 134°24′07″W	Angoon	
7	Glacier Bay Lodge Complex Historic District	Glacier Bay Lodge Complex Historic District	October 5, 2026 (#100013454)	179 Bartlett Cove Road; 58°27′16″N 135°52′56″W	Gustavus	
8	Hasselborg Cabin		November 2, 1995 (#95001291)	Along Hasselborg Creek, on Hasselborg Lake, Admiralty Island National Monument; 57°39′47″N 134°15′15″W	Angoon	
9	Hasselborg Lake East Shelter Cabin		November 2, 1995 (#95001308)	Eastern shore of Hasselborg Lake, Admiralty Island National Monument; 57°40′06″N 134°12′49″W	Angoon	
10	Hasselborg Lake North Shelter Cabin		November 2, 1995 (#95001307)	Northern shore of Hasselborg Lake, Admiralty Island National Monument; 57°46′03″N 134°19′20″W	Angoon	
11	Hasselborg Lake South Shelter Cabin		November 2, 1995 (#95001300)	Western shore of Hasselborg Lake, Admiralty Island National Monument; 57°39′59″N 134°15′23″W	Angoon	
12	Lake Guerin East Shelter Cabin		November 2, 1995 (#95001306)	Eastern end of Lake Guerin, Admiralty Island National Monument; 57°39′37″N 134°17′12″W	Angoon	
13	Lake Guerin West Shelter Cabin		November 2, 1995 (#95001301)	Western end of Lake Guerin, Admiralty Island National Monument; 57°38′57″N 134°20′36″W	Angoon	
14	Mitchell Bay Shelter Cabin		November 2, 1995 (#95001302)	Northwestern shore of Mitchell Bay, Admiralty Island National Monument; 57°33′52″N 134°23′54″W	Angoon	
15	Mole Harbor Shelter Cabin		November 2, 1995 (#95001297)	Head of Mole Harbor, Admiralty Island National Monument; 57°39′34″N 134°06′00″W	Angoon	
16	Point Retreat Light Station	Point Retreat Light Station	June 19, 2003 (#03000529)	Mansfield Peninsula, northern end of Admiralty Island; 58°24′41″N 134°57′18″W	Juneau	
17	St. John the Baptist Church	St. John the Baptist Church	June 6, 1980 (#80004589)	On hillside north of Beaver Trail Street; 57°30′13″N 134°35′14″W	Angoon	Russian Orthodox Church
18	Thayer Lake East Shelter Cabin		November 2, 1995 (#95001309)	Eastern shore of Thayer Lake southern arm, Admiralty Island National Monument; 57°38′03″N 134°27′53″W	Angoon	
19	Thayer Lake North Shelter Cabin		November 2, 1995 (#95001304)	Northern end of Thayer Lake, Admiralty Island National Monument; 57°41′22″N 134°24′44″W	Angoon	
20	Thayer Lake South Shelter Cabin		November 2, 1995 (#95001298)	Southern end of Thayer Lake, Admiralty Island National Monument; 57°35′51″N 134°28′12″W	Angoon	
21	Windfall Harbor Shelter Cabin		November 2, 1995 (#95001299)	Southwestern shore of Windfall Harbor, Admiralty Island National Monument; 57°50′07″N 134°18′29″W	Angoon	

== See also ==
- List of National Historic Landmarks in Alaska
- National Register of Historic Places listings in Alaska
