= Tiedeman Island =

Island in the Alexander Archipelago, Alaska, U.S.

Coordinates: 57°49′34″N 134°09′19″W

Tiedeman Island is an island in the Alexander Archipelago, east of Admiralty Island, about two-thirds up from the entrance of Seymour Canal, which is a large inlet in the Admiralty Island National Monument and Wilderness in Southeast Alaska, United States. To its north is Swan Island. It was named by William Healy Dall of the United States Coast and Geodetic Survey, and published in the 1883 American Coast Pilot. The first European to discover and chart the island was Joseph Whidbey, master of HMS Discovery during George Vancouver's 1791–1795 expedition, in 1794. The island features nesting habitat for a large number of bald eagles and is part of the Seymour Canal Eagle observation area, used for long-term observation of bald eagles. Old-growth forest covers 30% of the island. There is one lake on the island. Peak elevation is less than 200 meters (656 feet).
