= Mole Harbor Shelter Cabin =

- U.S. National Register of Historic Places
- Alaska Heritage Resources Survey
- Location within Alaska
- Location: Head of Mole Harbor, Admiralty Island National Monument
- Nearest city: Angoon, Alaska
- Coordinates: 57°39′34″N 134°06′00″W
- Area: less than one acre
- Built: 1936
- Built by: Civilian Conservation Corps
- MPS: CCC Historic Properties in Alaska MPS
- NRHP reference No.: 95001297
- AHRS No.: SIT-364
- Added to NRHP: November 2, 1995

The Mole Harbor Shelter Lookout/Cabin is a historic backcountry shelter in the Admiralty Island National Monument, part of the Tongass National Forest in Southeast Alaska. It is one of a number of such facilities built by Civilian Conservation Corps (CCC) on the Admiralty Island Canoe Route between 1933 and 1937. This cabin, a three-sided Adirondack-style log structure with shake walls and roof, was built in 1936. The cabin, situated overlooking a tidal flat near the head of Mole Harbor on the east side of the island, continues to be maintained by the Forest Service. It is accessible via water, or by a trail from Lake Alexander.

The cabin was listed on the National Register of Historic Places in 1995.

== See also ==
- National Register of Historic Places listings in Hoonah-Angoon Census Area, Alaska
