= Windfall Harbor Shelter Cabin =

- U.S. National Register of Historic Places
- Alaska Heritage Resources Survey
- Location within Alaska
- Location: Southwestern shore of Windfall Harbor, Admiralty Island National Monument
- Nearest city: Angoon, Alaska
- Coordinates: 57°50′07″N 134°18′29″W
- Area: less than one acre
- Built: 1936
- Built by: Civilian Conservation Corps
- MPS: CCC Historic Properties in Alaska MPS
- NRHP reference No.: 95001299
- AHRS No.: SIT-371
- Added to NRHP: November 2, 1995

The Windfall Harbor Shelter Cabin is a historic backcountry shelter in the Admiralty Island National Monument, part of the Tongass National Forest in Southeast Alaska. It was one of a number of such facilities built by Civilian Conservation Corps (CCC) on the Admiralty Island Canoe Route between 1933 and 1937. This cabin, a three-sided Adirondack-style log structure with shake walls and roof, is located near the southern end of Windfall Harbor, an inlet on the east side of Admiralty Island. The shelter underwent repairs in 1986. The Forest Service is in 2014 in the planning phases of a project to relocate the cabin a short distance to move it away from a major bear travel path.

The cabin was listed on the National Register of Historic Places in 1995.

== See also ==
- National Register of Historic Places listings in Hoonah-Angoon Census Area, Alaska
