= Lake Guerin West Shelter Cabin =

- U.S. National Register of Historic Places
- Alaska Heritage Resources Survey
- Location within Alaska
- Location: Western end of Lake Guerin, Admiralty Island National Monument
- Nearest city: Angoon, Alaska
- Coordinates: 57°38′57″N 134°20′36″W
- Area: less than one acre
- Built: 1936
- Built by: Civilian Conservation Corps
- MPS: CCC Historic Properties in Alaska MPS
- NRHP reference No.: 95001301
- AHRS No.: SIT-366
- Added to NRHP: November 2, 1995

The Lake Guerin Shelter Lookout/Cabin, historically the Lake Guerin West Shelter Cabin is a historic backcountry shelter in the Admiralty Island National Monument, part of the Tongass National Forest in Southeast Alaska. It is one of a number of such facilities built by Civilian Conservation Corps (CCC) on the Admiralty Island Canoe Route between 1933 and 1937. This cabin, a three-sided Adirondack-style log structure with shake walls and roof, was built in 1936. The cabin continues to be maintained by the Forest Service.

The cabin was listed on the National Register of Historic Places in 1995.

== See also ==
- National Register of Historic Places listings in Hoonah-Angoon Census Area, Alaska
