= Glass Peninsula =

Peninsula in Alaska, United States

Coordinates: 57°49′20″N 133°59′28″W

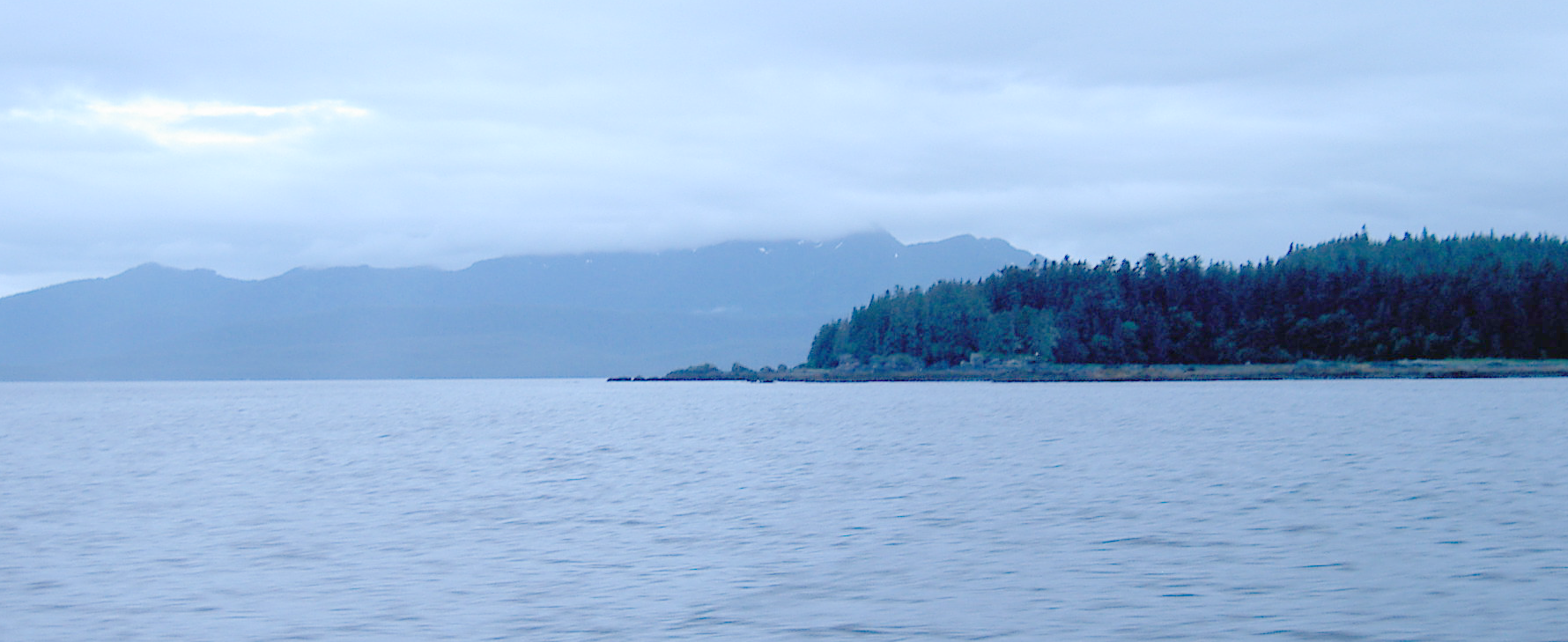
Southern tip of Glass Peninsula (2011)

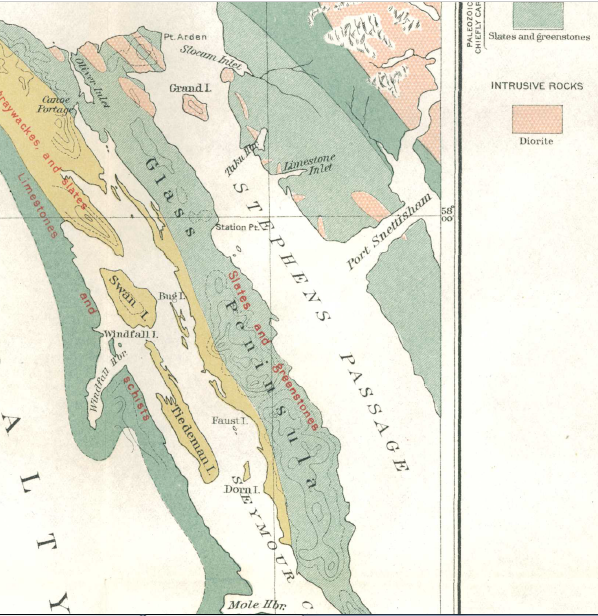
Geological map of the Glass Peninsula

The Glass Peninsula is a peninsula extending southeast from Admiralty Island, between Seymour Canal and Stephens Passage, Southeast Alaska, United States. It was named by the United States Coast and Geodetic Survey for United States Navy Commander Henry Glass, who had made surveys in the area in 1881. It was first charted in 1794 by Joseph Whidbey, master of HMS Discovery, during George Vancouver's 1791–1795 expedition.
