= Swan Island (Alaska) =

Island in Alaska, United States

Coordinates: 57°55′53″N 134°14′12″W

Swan Island is an island in the Alexander Archipelago, east of Admiralty Island, near the head of Seymour Canal, Southeast Alaska, United States. To its south is Tiedeman Island. It was named in 1890 by Lieutenant Commander Mansfield of the United States Navy. The first European to discover and chart the island was Joseph Whidbey, master of HMS Discovery during George Vancouver's 1791–1795 expedition, in 1794.
