= Big Shaheen Cabin =

- U.S. National Register of Historic Places
- Alaska Heritage Resources Survey
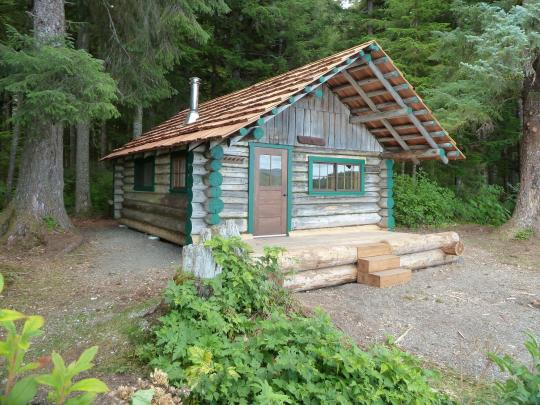
- Undated government photograph

- Location within Alaska
- Location: On Hasselborg Lake, Admiralty Island National Monument
- Nearest city: Angoon, Alaska
- Coordinates: 57°42′04″N 134°16′42″W
- Area: less than one acre
- Built: 1935
- Built by: Civilian Conservation Corps
- MPS: CCC Historic Properties in Alaska MPS
- NRHP reference No.: 95001292
- AHRS No.: SIT-019
- Added to NRHP: November 2, 1995

The Big Shaheen Cabin, in the Admiralty Island National Monument near Angoon, Alaska, is a historic log cabin that was built by the Civilian Conservation Corps in 1935. It was listed on the National Register of Historic Places in 1995; the listing included the cabin and three other contributing structures.

It was built as part of the Admiralty Island Civilian Conservation Corps Canoe Route. The cabin is made of 10-inch (250 mm) logs and its gable roof has a six-foot overhang at the front to make a porch. There are three "culturally modified" trees in the area.

== See also ==
- National Register of Historic Places listings in Hoonah–Angoon Census Area, Alaska
