= Distin Lake Shelter Cabin =

- U.S. National Register of Historic Places
- Alaska Heritage Resources Survey
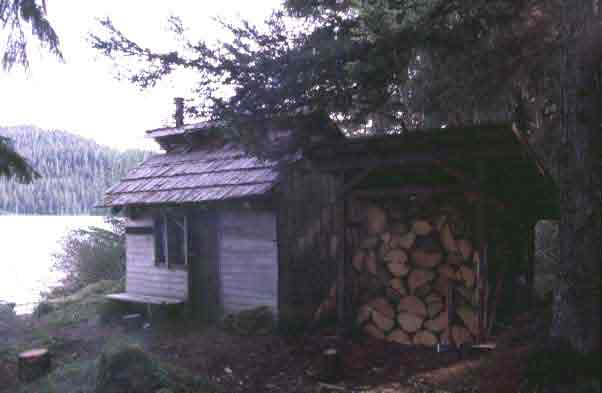

- Location within Alaska
- Location: Northwestern shore of Distin Lake, Admiralty Island National Monument
- Nearest city: Angoon, Alaska
- Coordinates: 57°37′46″N 134°24′07″W
- Area: less than one acre
- Built: 1935
- Built by: Civilian Conservation Corps
- MPS: CCC Historic Properties in Alaska MPS
- NRHP reference No.: 95001294
- AHRS No.: SIT-361
- Added to NRHP: November 2, 1995

The Distin Lake Shelter Cabin is a historic backcountry shelter in the Admiralty Island National Monument. It is located on the northwest shore of Distin Lake, along the Admiralty Island Canoe Route. The cabin, originally a three-sided Adirondack log shelter, was constructed by a Civilian Conservation Corps crew in 1932. In 1960, a fourth wall, wooden floor, and bunk beds were added to the shelter. There is a window, and the front door is one recycled from a theater; it is labeled "Balcony" on the inside.

The cabin was listed on the National Register of Historic Places in 1995. In 2014, it was listed by the United States Forest Service as being in poor condition and unavailable for use.

== See also ==
- National Register of Historic Places listings in Hoonah–Angoon Census Area, Alaska
