= Davidson Lake Shelter Cabin =

- U.S. National Register of Historic Places
- Alaska Heritage Resources Survey
- Location within Alaska
- Location: Western end of Davidson Lake, Admiralty Island National Monument
- Nearest city: Angoon, Alaska
- Coordinates: 57°36′15″N 134°22′48″W
- Area: less than one acre
- Built: 1935
- Built by: Civilian Conservation Corps
- MPS: CCC Historic Properties in Alaska MPS
- NRHP reference No.: 95001303
- AHRS No.: SIT-367
- Added to NRHP: November 2, 1995

The Davidson Lake Shelter Cabin is a historic three-sided log shelter located near Davidson Lake in the Admiralty Island National Monument. The structure was built in the 1930s by a crew of the Civilian Conservation Corps, a Great Depression-era works project of the United States government. The basic superstructure of the shelter is made of peeled logs, and the roof and walls are composed of wooden shakes (no longer original). It is one of a series of CCC-built shelters along the Admiralty Island Canoe Route.

The cabin was listed on the National Register of Historic Places in 1995.

== See also ==
- National Register of Historic Places listings in Hoonah–Angoon Census Area, Alaska
