= Lake Guerin East Shelter Cabin =

- U.S. National Register of Historic Places
- Alaska Heritage Resources Survey
- Location within Alaska
- Location: Eastern end of Lake Guerin, Admiralty Island National Monument
- Nearest city: Angoon, Alaska
- Coordinates: 57°39′37″N 134°17′12″W
- Area: less than one acre
- Built: 1937
- Built by: Civilian Conservation Corps
- MPS: CCC Historic Properties in Alaska MPS
- NRHP reference No.: 95001306
- AHRS No.: SIT-372
- Added to NRHP: November 2, 1995

The Lake Guerin East Shelter Cabin is a historic backcountry shelter in the Admiralty Island National Monument, part of the Tongass National Forest in Southeast Alaska. It is one of a number of such facilities built by Civilian Conservation Corps (CCC) on the Admiralty Island Canoe Route between 1933 and 1937. This cabin, a three-sided Adirondack-style log structure with shake walls and roof, was built in 1935. As reported in 1995, only remnants of the cabin remain at the east of Lake Guerin, near a portage trail leading to Hasselborg Lake.

The cabin was listed on the National Register of Historic Places in 1995.

== See also ==
- National Register of Historic Places listings in Hoonah-Angoon Census Area, Alaska
