= Hasselborg Lake South Shelter Cabin =

United States historic place

- U.S. National Register of Historic Places
- Alaska Heritage Resources Survey
- Location within Alaska
- Location: Western shore of Hasselborg Lake, Admiralty Island National Monument
- Nearest city: Angoon, Alaska
- Coordinates: 57°39′59″N 134°15′23″W
- Area: less than one acre
- Built: 1935
- Built by: Civilian Conservation Corps
- MPS: CCC Historic Properties in Alaska MPS
- NRHP reference No.: 95001300
- AHRS No.: SIT-365
- Added to NRHP: November 2, 1995

The Hasselborg Lake South Shelter Cabin is a historic backcountry shelter in the Admiralty Island National Monument, part of the Tongass National Forest in Southeast Alaska. It is one of a number of such facilities built by Civilian Conservation Corps (CCC) on the Admiralty Island Canoe Route between 1933 and 1937. The cabin is located on the southwest of Hasselborg Lake, north of the Hasselborg Cabin, and near the portage trail leading to Lake Guerin. As built by the CCC, it was a three-sided Adirondack-style log shelter with shake walls and roof. Sills and the lower ends of its posts have been replaced due to rot.

The cabin was listed on the National Register of Historic Places in 1995.

== See also ==
- National Register of Historic Places listings in Hoonah-Angoon Census Area, Alaska
