= Thayer Lake East Shelter Cabin =

- U.S. National Register of Historic Places
- Alaska Heritage Resources Survey
- Location within Alaska
- Location: Eastern shore of Thayer Lake southern arm, Admiralty Island National Monument
- Nearest city: Angoon, Alaska
- Coordinates: 57°38′03″N 134°27′53″W
- Area: less than one acre
- Built: 1936
- Built by: Civilian Conservation Corps
- MPS: CCC Historic Properties in Alaska MPS
- NRHP reference No.: 95001309
- AHRS No.: SIT-375
- Added to NRHP: November 2, 1995

The Thayer Lake East Shelter Cabin is the ruined remains of a historic backcountry shelter in the Admiralty Island National Monument, part of the Tongass National Forest in Southeast Alaska. It was one of a number of such facilities built by Civilian Conservation Corps (CCC) on the Admiralty Island Canoe Route between 1933 and 1937. This cabin, a three-sided Adirondack-style log structure with shake walls and roof, was built in 1936, and located on the lake near the portage trail connecting to Distin Lake. Unlike other cabins built by the CCC on the island, which were of post-and-beam construction, in this one the logs were saddle-notched together at the corners.

The cabin was listed on the National Register of Historic Places in 1995. It was described as lacking its roof and being derelict at the time of its listing. It does not appear on Forest Service maps unlike other shelters in the area, indicating it is closed to public use. The structure at the end of the Distin/Thayer trail on Thayer Lake was not a 3 sided shelter of any kind. It was a very crude log structure roughly 4ft. High. Used only for boat storage. Access to the boat was by removing the concave/convex Timbers which served as the roof.

== See also ==
- National Register of Historic Places listings in Hoonah-Angoon Census Area, Alaska
