= Hasselborg Lake North Shelter Cabin =

- U.S. National Register of Historic Places
- Alaska Heritage Resources Survey
- Location within Alaska
- Location: Northern shore of Hasselborg Lake, Admiralty Island National Monument
- Nearest city: Angoon, Alaska
- Coordinates: 57°46′03″N 134°19′20″W
- Area: less than one acre
- Built: 1935; 91 years ago
- Built by: Civilian Conservation Corps
- MPS: CCC Historic Properties in Alaska MPS
- NRHP reference No.: 95001307
- AHRS No.: SIT-374
- Added to NRHP: November 2, 1995

The Hasselborg Lake North Shelter Cabin is a historic backcountry shelter in the Admiralty Island National Monument, part of Tongass National Forest in Southeast Alaska. The three-sided Adirondack-style log cabin, of which at best ruins survive today, was built in 1935 by a Civilian Conservation Corps work crew as part of a canoe route across the island. It is located at the northeast corner of Hasselborg Lake, where a poorly maintained or abandoned trail leads north to Windfall Harbor.

The cabin site was listed on the National Register of Historic Places in 1995. At that time the cabin site had been flooded due to beaver activity, and its roof was failing due to an extended period of poor maintenance.

== See also ==
- National Register of Historic Places listings in Hoonah-Angoon Census Area, Alaska
