= ABC Islands (Alaska) =

Islands in the Alexander Archipelago in Alaska, USA

Coordinates: 57.4°N 134.733°W

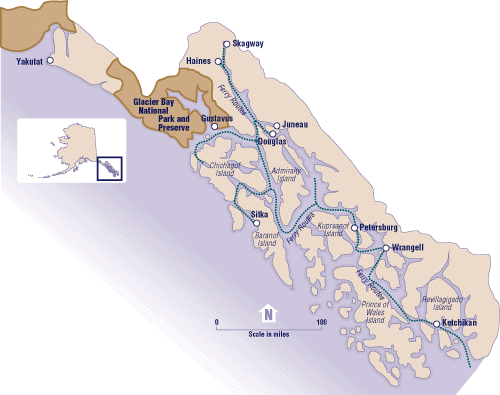
Map of the islands and surroundings.

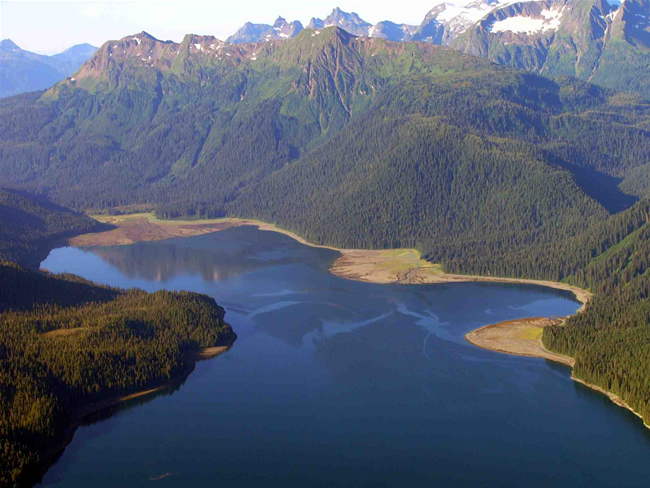
Windfall harbor in Admiralty Island, Alaska

The ABC Islands is the colloquial name for the Alaskan islands of Admiralty, Baranof, and Chichagof in the northern part of the Alexander Archipelago, which are all part of the Tongass National Forest. The islands are known for their wilderness and wildlife, including a dense brown bear population.

Most of the islands' area is federally protected wilderness. The city of Sitka has its urban center on the west coast of Baranof Island. Outside of Sitka, there is only minimal industry and human presence on the islands, despite the fact that Admiralty (7th), Baranof (10th), and Chichagof (5th) are among the largest islands in the United States.

== Ecology and wildlife ==
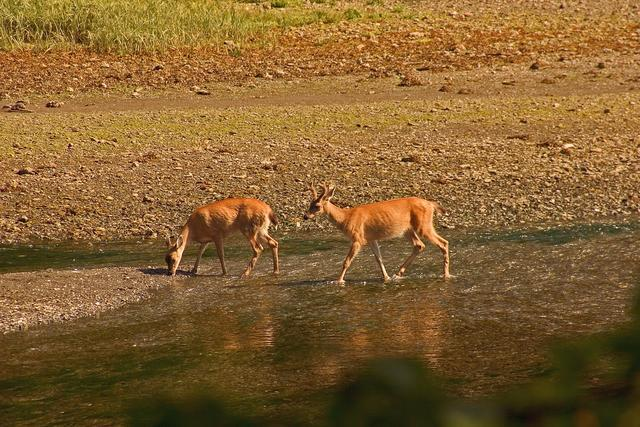
A pair of Sitka deer at the Indian River on Baranof Island.

Western hemlock, Sitka spruce and western redcedar dominate the prolific rainforest vegetation of Admiralty Island; wildlife in abundance include brown bears, bald eagles, many species of salmon, whales, and deer. Admiralty Island is home to the highest density of brown bears in North America. An estimated 1,600 brown bears inhabit the island, outnumbering Admiralty's human residents nearly three to one. It has more brown bears than the entire contiguous United States, and one of the highest densities of bald eagles in the world.

Baranof Island is home to a diverse ecosystem, mainly containing land and ocean mammals. The most notable species include brown bears, Sitka deer, sea otters, sea lions, dolphins, porpoises, mountain goats, and humpback whales. The Steller sea lion, the prominent species of sea lions in the area, uses the southern tip of Baranof Island as a breeding ground. This led to the area becoming a protected part of Alaska's Maritime National Wildlife Refuge, as one of five sea lion breeding areas in Southeast Alaska.

A decline in the mountain goat population of Baranof Island led researchers to monitor the population in order to determine the best means of increasing population numbers. Originally, it was believed no mountain goats were native to the island, and mountain goats were actually imported into Baranof Island from neighboring islands. Through research it was found that there may have been an indigenous species of mountain goat to Baranof Island, as the mountain goats prominent today can be traced back to two different lineages.
