= Henry Glass (admiral) =

United States Navy admiral

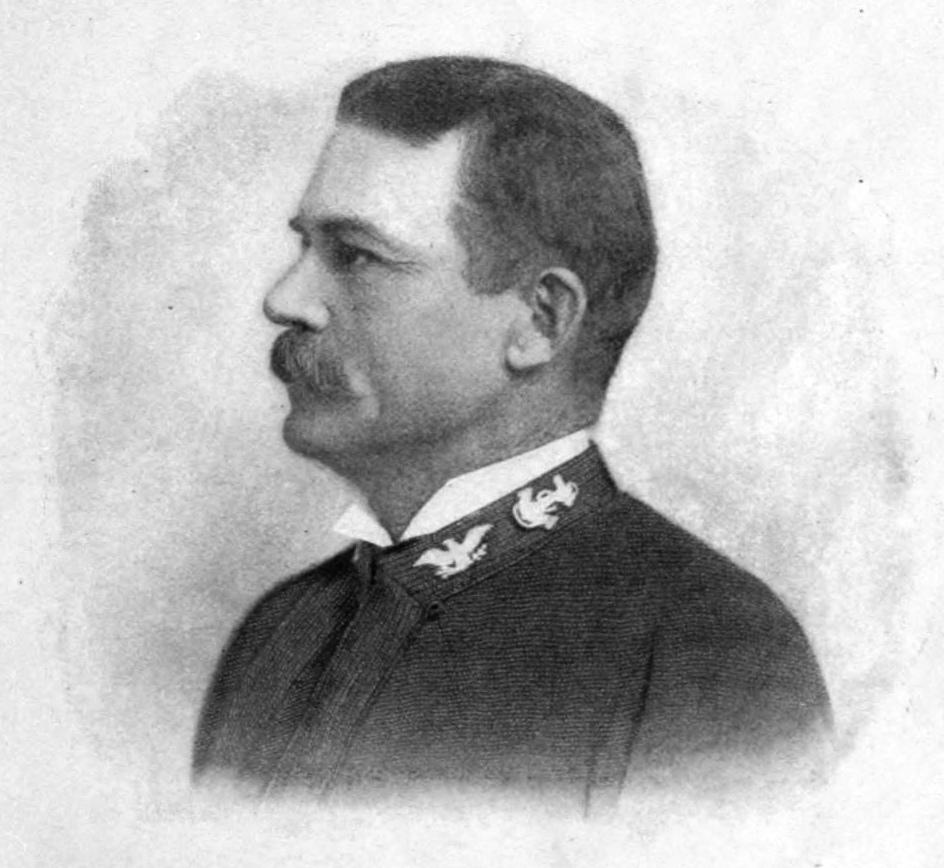
- Born: January 7, 1844; Hopkinsville, Kentucky, U.S.
- Died: September 1, 1908 (aged 64); Paso Robles, California, U.S.
- Military career
- Allegiance: United States of America: Union
- Branch: United States Navy: Union Navy
- Service years: 1863–1906
- Rank: Rear admiral
- Commands: USS Nyack; USS Jamestown; USS Wachusett; USS Monocacy; USS Cincinnati; USS Texas; USS Charleston; Pacific Squadron
- Conflicts: American Civil War; Spanish–American War

Henry Glass (January 7, 1844 – September 1, 1908) was a rear admiral in the United States Navy, best remembered for his role in the bloodless capture of Guam in the Spanish–American War. He was also a Union veteran of the American Civil War.

== Biography ==
Glass was born in Hopkinsville, Kentucky, and entered the Naval Academy in 1860, graduating a year ahead of schedule with the rank of ensign on May 28, 1863.

=== Civil War ===
He saw considerable action during the Civil War while attached to the steam sloop Canandaigua. He took part in engagements with Confederate batteries at Charleston, South Carolina, between July and September 1863; in the Stono River in December 1863 and July 1864; and in the North Edisto River in February 1865. He also participated in the capture of Georgetown, South Carolina, in February 1865.

=== 1865–1880 ===
After the war, Glass was advanced to the rank of master on November 10, 1865; to lieutenant on November 10, 1866; and to lieutenant commander on March 12, 1868. Sea duty came in a succession of ships: the steam sloop Powhatan in the Pacific Squadron (1865–1868); the steam sloop Tuscarora in the North Atlantic Squadron (1869); and the steam sloop Mohican in the Pacific Squadron (1870–1871). During his time in the Mohican, he was assigned to temporary command of the wooden-hulled, screw gunboat Nyack for six months during 1870. Also while serving in Mohican, he performed duty as an aide on the staff of the Commander of the Pacific Squadron, Rear Admiral John Lorimer Worden.

Glass then served in the screw sloop Iroquois in the Asiatic Squadron from 1872 to 1873, before returning to the United States for the first of several tours of duty at the Mare Island Navy Yard, first serving in the receiving ship Independence, before he was given command of the State of California's State Marine School Ship, Jamestown, which was recommissioned for this service on July 21, 1876.

Returning to the Navy on March 3, 1879, Jamestown was refitted at Mare Island and sailed from San Francisco for Alaska on May 22, 1879, to protect American lives and property threatened by "the disturbed condition of affairs" on shore. She arrived at Sitka on June 14 and remained there into the following year "preserving the peace and furnishing security to persons and property ... and ... surveying the waters and bays adjacent to Sitka." Promoted to commander on October 27, 1879, Glass served as the senior naval officer in Alaskan waters in charge of Indian affairs in that territory in 1880.

=== 1881–1898 ===
In 1881, Glass took command of the screw sloop-of-war Wachusett, of the Pacific Squadron, and during that year Wachusett conducted hydrographic survey work in Southeast Alaska under his command. He began a tour at the Mare Island Navy Yard in 1883. During his time there, he compiled Marine International Law, a collection drawn, as he freely acknowledged, "from the writings and opinions of certain acknowledged authorities on the subject" to provide a handy reference work for naval officers. This volume was published in 1885. After winding up his tour at Mare Island in 1886, Glass commanded the sidewheel gunboat Monocacy of the Asiatic Squadron into 1888.

Glass' next duty was that of Commandant of Cadets at the Naval Academy, a post he held from 1889 to 1891, before serving on the Naval Examining Board from 1891 to 1893. Since the latter assignment was only intermittent, Glass served as equipment officer of the Mare Island Navy Yard in 1892 and later became captain of the yard the following year. On January 23, 1894, he was commissioned as captain.

He returned to sea in 1894 and commanded the cruiser Cincinnati from 1894 to 1896 before he took command of the battleship Texas. He then returned to Mare Island to the post of captain of the yard in 1897.

=== Spanish–American War ===
Upon the outbreak of war with Spain in 1898, the twin-screw protected cruiser Charleston was quickly readied for service, with Glass in command. Commissioned on May 5, 1898, Charleston set out for the Hawaiian Islands 16 days later. Escorting three transports—City of Peking, Australia, and City of Sydney—she sailed from Honolulu on June 4, bound for Manila, Philippines. When clear of land, Glass opened his confidential orders, which directed him to take the island of Guam while en route to the Philippines. Her mission thus outlined, Charleston altered course for Guam, and the cruiser and her three consorts reached their interim destination at daybreak on June 20. Leaving the transports anchored outside, Charleston boldly entered the harbor and fired a challenge, only to receive no return fire of any kind. Spanish emissaries soon called upon Glass and were astonished to learn that a state of war existed between their respective countries. As the island was virtually undefended—the forts were in ruins—the Spanish governor surrendered; and Glass took possession of Guam for the United States on the afternoon of June 21, 1898.

As the orders specified, Charleston proceeded on to Manila and participated in the operations that resulted in the surrender of that city in August 1898 and took part in the initial actions against Filipino "insurgents" who were resisting America's assumption of control in the Philippine Islands.

=== 1898–1908 ===
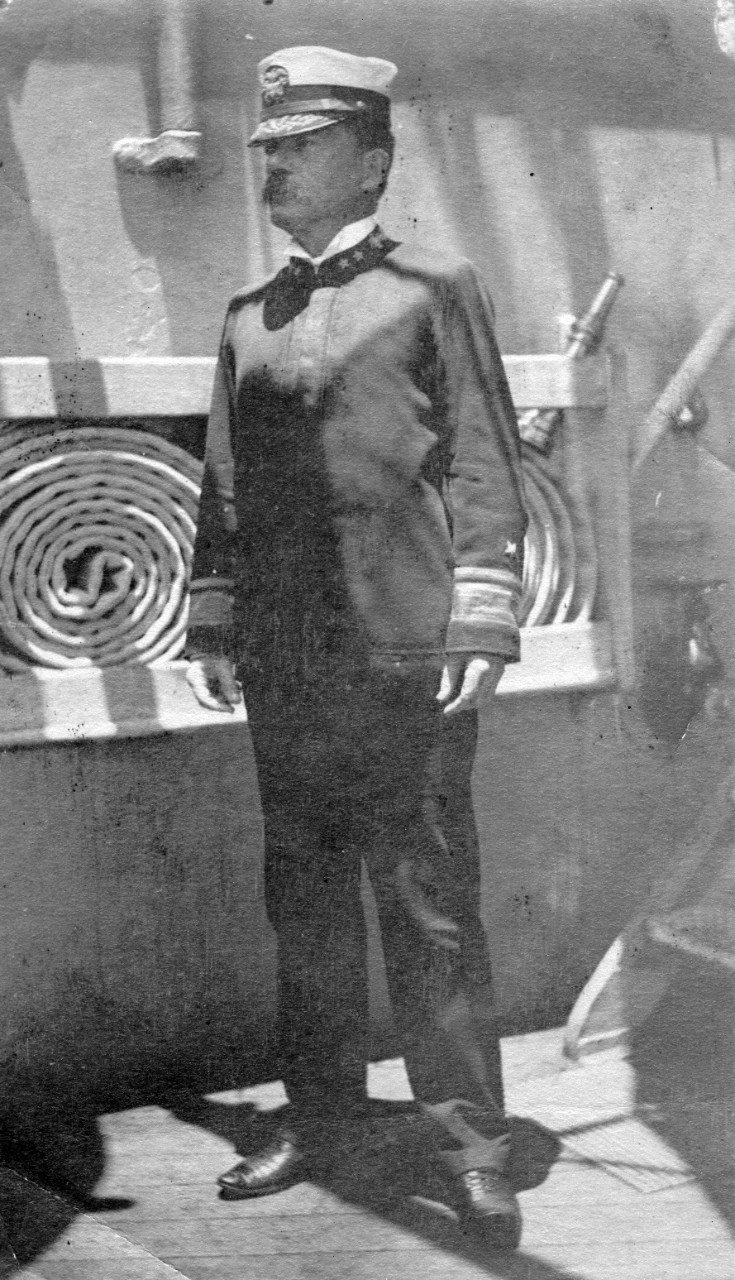
Rear Admiral Henry Glass, likely aboard USS New York in 1903

Relieved of command of Charleston on December 12, 1898, by Capt. W. H. Whiting, Glass returned to the United States and soon assumed command of the naval training station at San Francisco, California, on January 23, 1899. Promoted to rear admiral in 1901, he broke his flag in the armored cruiser New York on February 4, 1903, as Commander-in-Chief, Pacific Squadron. During his tour of duty in command of the squadron, the flagship, New York, together with the cruiser Marblehead and screw steamer Fortune visited Adak and Kiska, in the Aleutian Islands, conducting surveys of the latter place in July 1903 with an eye toward establishing a coaling station there.

Later, with New York requiring extended repairs at the Puget Sound Navy Yard, Glass and his staff proceeded to San Francisco, and he briefly wore his flag in the cruiser Boston from September 28 to 30, 1903 before he transferred to the cruiser Marblehead on the 30th. On November 3, a revolution broke out on the isthmus of Panama, which soon won the independence of that strategic region from Colombia. Glass, in Marblehead, was dispatched to Panama's Pacific coast and arrived there a week later. In addition to the Marblehead, his fleet consisted of the USS Wyoming, USS Concord and USS Nero. During the period of tension, Glass stationed one ship at Darien harbor to protect American lives and property and, with the permission of the Panamanian government, sent small observation parties from his ships offshore to explore the rivers, roads, and trails of the region, thereby gaining "much information ... of a country of which very little was known."

He was a Veteran Companion of the California Commandery of both the Military Order of the Loyal Legion of the United States and the Military Order of Foreign Wars.

Placed on the retired list on January 7, 1906, Glass served subsequently on active duty as Commandant, Pacific Naval District. He died in Paso Robles, California, on September 1, 1908. He was buried at Mountain View Cemetery in Oakland, California.

== Honors ==
The United States Coast and Geodetic Survey named the Glass Peninsula in Southeast Alaska for Glass. The Glass Breakwater in Apra Harbor on Guam also is named in his honor.

Preceded by Juan Marina; Final Spanish Governor	Commissioner of Guam; 1898	Succeeded by Francisco Portusach Martínez
