= Thayer Lake South Shelter Cabin =

- U.S. National Register of Historic Places
- Alaska Heritage Resources Survey
- Location within Alaska
- Location: Southern end of Thayer Lake, Admiralty Island National Monument
- Nearest city: Angoon, Alaska
- Coordinates: 57°35′51″N 134°28′12″W
- Area: less than one acre
- Built: 1936
- Built by: Civilian Conservation Corps
- MPS: CCC Historic Properties in Alaska MPS
- NRHP reference No.: 95001298
- AHRS No.: SIT-369
- Added to NRHP: November 2, 1995

The Thayer Lake South Shelter Cabin is a historic backcountry shelter in the Admiralty Island National Monument, part of the Tongass National Forest in Southeast Alaska. It was one of a number of such facilities built by Civilian Conservation Corps (CCC) on the Admiralty Island Canoe Route between 1933 and 1937. This cabin, a three-sided Adirondack-style log structure with shake walls and roof, was built in 1935, and is located near the southern tip of Thayer Lake, facing a reedy stream blocked by a beaver dam. A portage trail runs nearby.

The cabin was listed on the National Register of Historic Places in 1995.

== See also ==
- National Register of Historic Places listings in Hoonah-Angoon Census Area, Alaska
