= Hasselborg Lake East Shelter Cabin =

- U.S. National Register of Historic Places
- Alaska Heritage Resources Survey
- Location within Alaska
- Location: Eastern shore of Hasselborg Lake, Admiralty Island National Monument
- Nearest city: Angoon, Alaska
- Coordinates: 57°40′06″N 134°12′49″W
- Area: less than one acre
- Built: 1936
- Built by: Civilian Conservation Corps
- MPS: CCC Historic Properties in Alaska MPS
- NRHP reference No.: 95001308
- AHRS No.: SIT-373
- Added to NRHP: November 2, 1995

The Hasselborg Lake East Shelter Cabin was a historic backcountry shelter in the Admiralty Island National Monument, part of Tongass National Forest in Southeast Alaska. The cabin, of which at best ruins survive today (it was described as being collapsed as long ago as 1985), was a three-sided Adirondack-style log structure, made of peeled logs, and covered with wood shakes. It was located near the mouth of the stream that drains Beaver Lake into Hasselborg Lake. The shelter was built in 1936 as part of a Civilian Conservation Corps works project to create a canoe route across the island.

The cabin site was listed on the National Register of Historic Places in 1995.

== See also ==
- National Register of Historic Places listings in Hoonah-Angoon Census Area, Alaska
