= USS Nyack (1863) =

Gunboat of the United States Navy

History

United States
- Name: USS Nyack
- Builder: New York Navy Yard
- Laid down: 25 March 1863
- Launched: 6 October 1863
- Commissioned: 28 September 1864
- Decommissioned: 15 March 1871
- Fate: Sold, 30 November 1883

General characteristics
- Type: Screw gunboat
- Displacement: 836 long tons (849 t)
- Length: 179 ft 6 in (54.71 m)
- Beam: 29 ft 8 in (9.04 m)
- Draft: 11 ft 6 in (3.51 m)
- Speed: 10 knots (19 km/h; 12 mph)
- Armament: 1 × 100-pounder Parrott rifle; 1 × 30-pounder Parrott rifle; 2 × 9 in (230 mm) Dahlgren smoothbores; 2 × 24-pounder guns; 1 × 12-pounder rifle; 1 × heavy 12-pounder rifle

USS Nyack (/ˈnaɪ.æk/) was a wooden-hulled screw gunboat of the United States Navy that saw action in the American Civil War. After the Civil war, she was transferred to the Pacific where she patrolled the west coast of South America until she was decommissioned in 1871. She was sold and broken up in 1883.

== Construction and characteristics ==
Nyack's wooden hull was built at the New York Navy Yard. Her keel was laid on 25 March 1863. She was 180 feet (55 m) long with a beam of 29 feet 8 inches (9.04 m) and a fully loaded draft of 11 feet 6 inches (3.51 m). Her depth of hold was 12 feet 3 inches (3.73 m). Her capacity was 593 tons burden.

Nyack's machinery was designed by the Bureau of Steam Engineering under Benjamin Isherwood, Chief Engineer of the Navy. Her machinery was built by South Brooklyn Iron Works. She had two coal-fired boilers which provided steam to two steam engines, each with a single cylinder with a diameter of 30 inches (76 cm) and a stroke of 21 inches (53 cm). These drove a single propeller which gave the ship a maximum speed of 10 knots.

As originally constructed, her armament included 100-pounder and 30-pounder Parrott rifles, two 9-inch Dahlgren smoothbore guns, two 24-pounder guns, a 12-pounder, and a 12-pounder heavy rifle. Her battery was changed several times during her commission.

Nyack was launched on 6 October 1863. She was christened by Emma Paulding, daughter of Admiral Hiram Paulding. Her machinery was installed and the ship delivered to the Navy on 20 July 1864. She was commissioned on 28 September 1864, under the command of Lieutenant Commander L. Howard Newman.

Her original cost was $257,952.12. Her crew consisted of about 100 men. Her namesake is the town of Nyack, New York. The name is derived from a Native American word meaning "point" or "corner".

Rear Admiral David Porter, under whose command Nyack sailed during the Civil War, commented specifically on her and the small gunboats of her class:

These vessels, though, have proved themselves a perfect success as steam gunboats. They are fast, steady at sea, and come up in every respect to the requirements of a good vessel-of-war. They will all average eleven knots, are of light draught [sic] and will enter most of these southern harbors at high water. I do not think that they have canvas enough to cruise under sail alone, and the sail is only serviceable to them in very fresh breezes, or in lying to in a gale. As sea-boats these vessels are unsurpassed.

== Service history ==
=== Civil War, 1864–1865 ===
Nyack was assigned to the North Atlantic Blockading Squadron during the Civil War. She was active in enforcing the Union blockade of the Confederacy as early as November 1864.

On 23 December 1864 she took on coal at Beaufort, South Carolina and then joined Admiral Porter's fleet in the Cape Fear River for the first assault on Fort Fisher. At 11:20 am on 25 December 1864 Nyack joined in the bombardment of the fort. At 5:30 pm, on Porter's orders, Nyack sailed closer in to the beach and anchored in only 30 feet (9.1 m) in order to support the landing troops more closely. Her guns fired continuously during this phase of the battle. While the guns of the fort were silenced, the landing force was unable to take the bastion and was withdrawn.

Porter immediately began work on a new invasion plan, this time with a different army general. His fleet got underway from Fortress Monroe on January 12, 1865. By 11 pm on 13 January 1865, it had once again anchored off of Fort Fisher. Some histories of this battle place Nyack with the other gunboats of Porter's fleet in roughly the same position as she had in the first assault. It seems likely that this is in error as an abstract of Nyack's log for the period survives in Congressional reports. From 13 January to 17 January 1865, when the second assault on Fort Fisher took place, Nyack's log places her at the "Old Inlet" entrance to the Cape Fear River. At this location she could hear Porter's bombardment of Fort Fisher in the distance. Her crew witnessed the destruction of Fort Caswell by Confederate troops in the wake of the Union victory at Fort Fisher, but according to her log she did not take part in the battle.

Porter pushed up the Cape Fear River and began bombarding Fort Anderson on 17 February 1865. At 8 am on 18 February 1865 Nyack joined in the bombardment of the fort which continued into the evening. The Confederate guns were silenced by 3 pm. Faced with the approach of 8,000 Union troops under the command of General John Schofield, the fort was evacuated that night.

Nyack arrived back at the New York Navy Yard, via Beaufort, from Wilmington on 3 April 1865. She went into drydock there to be fitted for operation overseas.

=== Pacific, 1865–1871 ===
Nyack was assigned to the Navy's Pacific Squadron and set out for Valparaiso, Chile from New York on 22 July 1865. Her first stop was St. Thomas, Virgin Islands. On this first leg of the journey she burned fourteen tons of coal per day and averaged 8.5 knots. Nyack was at Rio de Janeiro, Brazil on 8 October 1865. She sailed from Montevideo, Uruguay, through the Strait of Magellan, and arrived in Valparaiso on 20 November 1865.

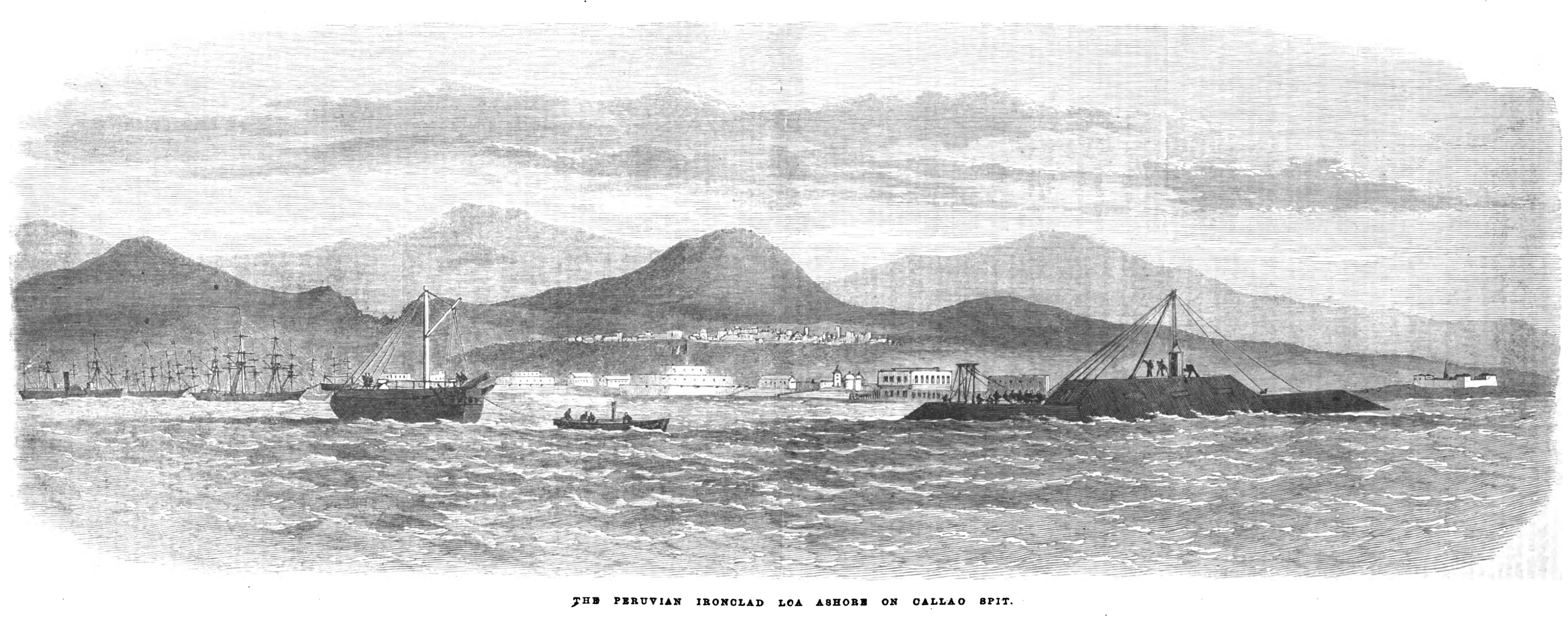
Peruvian ironclad Loa, aground prior to Nyack's arrival at Callao

Over the next five years she cruised the coasts of Panama, Ecuador, Peru, and Chile, protecting American nationals and interests while seeking to avoid direct involvement in armed conflicts between Spain and her former colonies and in bouts of civil unrest. For example, she sailed from Valparaiso on 1 February 1866 for Callao, Peru. Here Nyack assisted the Peruvian Navy in towing its ironclad Loa off a shoal in the harbor. This might not have been seen as strictly neutral by Spain which was at war with its former colony at the time. Nyack went on to Panama City, Panama, arriving on 22 June 1866, but now under the command of Lieutenant Commander Austin Pendergast, Captain Newman having died of "brain fever" on 31 May 1866.

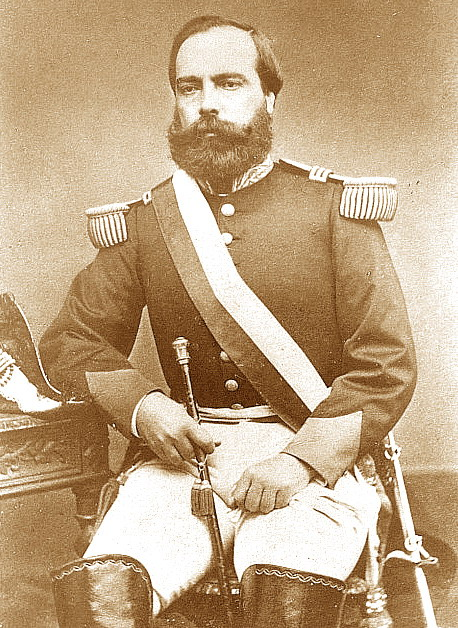
Peruvian President Mariano Prado was evacuated to Chile aboard Nyack after he was ousted by a coup in January 1868.

In January 1868, General Mariano Prado, President of Peru, was overthrown in a coup and sought refuge in the home of the United States ambassador. He was carried to safety in Chile aboard Nyack.

In July 1868 Captain Pendergast was relieved by Lieutenant Commander Charles A. Babcock, who was, in turn relieved by Lieutenant Commander Thomas H. Eastman in late 1869. Nyack sailed to the Galápagos Islands in 1869 and did some surveying there, a track chart of which survives in the National Archives. Ecuadorean authorities viewed this trip with suspicion and began an investigation, as rumors circulated that Nyack was going to take possession of the islands for the United States.

In January 1870, Nyack was ordered to support another surveying project, in this case an expedition to the Darien region of Panama. A U.S. force under Commander Thomas O. Selfridge explored the feasibility of an inter-oceanic canal at this location. Nyack was ordered to survey from the Gulf of San Miguel up the Savanna River, and the Bayamo River as far as the mouth of the Marmoni. She arrived on the Savanna on 13 April 1870. The ship surveyed 16 miles up the river and anchored there. Four of her boats carried the survey yet further up the river to the mouth of the Lara, which was reached on 6 May 1870.

After the expedition, Nyack ran to Panama City for coal and supplies. This trip coincided with a great fire in the town and 60 men of the crew turned out to help fight the blaze. It was reported that her machinery was disabled, so she sailed to Callao for repairs. Captain Eastman was relieved of command there and placed under arrest on charges of debt and scandalous conduct. Newspaper reports of the time said the cause was "too much [sic] French ballet dancers in Callao". Eastman was replaced by Lieutenant Commander Henry Glass.

Captain Glass took the ship to Honolulu, Hawaii, where she was on 31 December 1870. Nyack's boilers were damaged beyond repair, so she was forced to sail to Hawaii from Callao, a trip that took 45 days. The rescued crew of the wrecked USS Saginaw was transferred aboard Nyack on 14 January 1871. Given Nyack's poor condition, however, the crew of Saginaw was embarked on Moses Taylor, which took them to San Francisco. On 26 January 1871, Captain Glass was presented to King Kamehameha V as part of a reception to thank the king for assistance in rescuing the crew of the Saginaw. Nyack arrived in San Francisco from Hawaii on 24 February 1871.

On 28 February 1871, Captain Glass and all his officers were detached from Nyack. The ship was decommissioned on 15 March 1871. During March 1871 Nyack was surveyed at the Mare Island Naval Shipyard. It seems likely that the survey revealed that repairing the ship would be costly, since she never sailed again. She was placed in "ordinary" status, which is to say that she was maintained as a reserve ship with no permanent crew.

Nyack was sold to W. E. Mighell on 30 November 1883 for $6,500 through a sealed bidding process. Mighell had the ship towed from Mare Island to Cresham's Point, where she was broken up in December 1883.
