= Hasselborg Cabin =

- U.S. National Register of Historic Places
- Alaska Heritage Resources Survey
- Location within Alaska
- Location: Along Hasselborg Creek, on Hasselborg Lake, Admiralty Island National Monument
- Nearest city: Angoon, Alaska
- Coordinates: 57°39′47″N 134°15′15″W
- Area: less than one acre
- Built: 1937
- Built by: Civilian Conservation Corps
- MPS: CCC Historic Properties in Alaska MPS
- NRHP reference No.: 95001291
- AHRS No.: SIT-322

Significant dates
- Added to NRHP: November 2, 1995
- Designated AHRS: [date]

The Hasselborg Cabin, also known as the Hasselborg Creek Cabin, is a backcountry shelter in the Admiralty Island National Monument, part of Tongass National Forest in Southeast Alaska. It is one of a number of such facilities built by Civilian Conservation Corps (CCC) on the Admiralty Island Canoe Route between 1933 and 1937. As built by the CCC, it was a three-sided Adirondack-style log shelter, timber-framed, and measuring about 12'6" by 10'6". It is one of only two cabins built on the route that has a fireplace; it is built of brick and stone. It is also distinctive for its floor, which is a concrete slab (apparently an original element), whereas most other cabins originally had dirt floors. Its roof was originally wood shakes, but is now corrugated metal. The front has subsequently been enclosed.

The cabin was listed on the National Register of Historic Places in 1995.

== See also ==
- National Register of Historic Places listings in Hoonah-Angoon Census Area, Alaska
