= Kootznoowoo Wilderness =

Wilderness area in Alaska, United States

Coordinates: 57°38′15″N 134°21′04″W

- IUCN category Ib (wilderness area)

- Location within Alaska
- Location: Hoonah-Angoon Census Area, Alaska, United States
- Nearest city: Angoon, AK
- Area: 979,079 acres (396,219 ha)
- Established: December 2, 1980
- Governing body: U.S. Forest Service

The temperate rainforests of Admiralty Island's Kootznoowoo Wilderness are a unique environment among the 5,700,000 acres (2,300,000 ha) of federally-protected wilderness in Southeast Alaska.

The island's lush, towering cathedrals of old-growth Sitka spruce and western hemlock, rising out of a blanket of ferns on the forest floor, could not be more different from the glaciers and frozen alpine tundra found elsewhere in the state or other close-by areas (such as Tracy Arm or Misty Fjords National Monument).

These ancient forests are home to one of the highest concentrations of brown bear in the world, as well as black bear, thousands of bald eagles, harbor seal, moose, red fox, Sitka black-tailed deer, and a unique subspecies of coastal gray wolf. The rough-skinned newt and boreal toad—two of the only herpetiles adapted to life in Alaska—and all five species of Alaskan salmon are also found in Kootznoowoo.

The Kootznoowoo Wilderness includes most of Admiralty Island, except for the Mansfield Peninsula, the village of Angoon, and Native lands along the island's western shore.

The Wilderness is part of Admiralty Island National Monument, which itself is part of Tongass National Forest.
