= Lake Alexander (Alaska) =

Lake in the state of Alaska, United States

- Location within Alaska Location within North America
- Location: Admiralty Island, Hoonah-Angoon Census Area; Alexander Archipelago, Alaska
- Coordinates: 57°39′56″N 134°10′28″W
- Basin countries: United States
- Max. length: 1.5 miles (2.4 km)
- Surface elevation: 341 feet (104 m)

Lake Alexander is a lake in Southeast Alaska, 3 miles (4.8 km) west of Mole Harbor, on east coast of Admiralty Island; 61 miles (98 km) north-east of Sitka, Alaska in the Alexander Archipelago.

The lake was named in the Alexander Alaska Expedition of 1907 for Annie Montague Alexander, founder of the expedition.

== See also ==
- List of lakes of Alaska
