= Seymour Canal =

Coordinates: 57°47′10″N 134°04′27″W

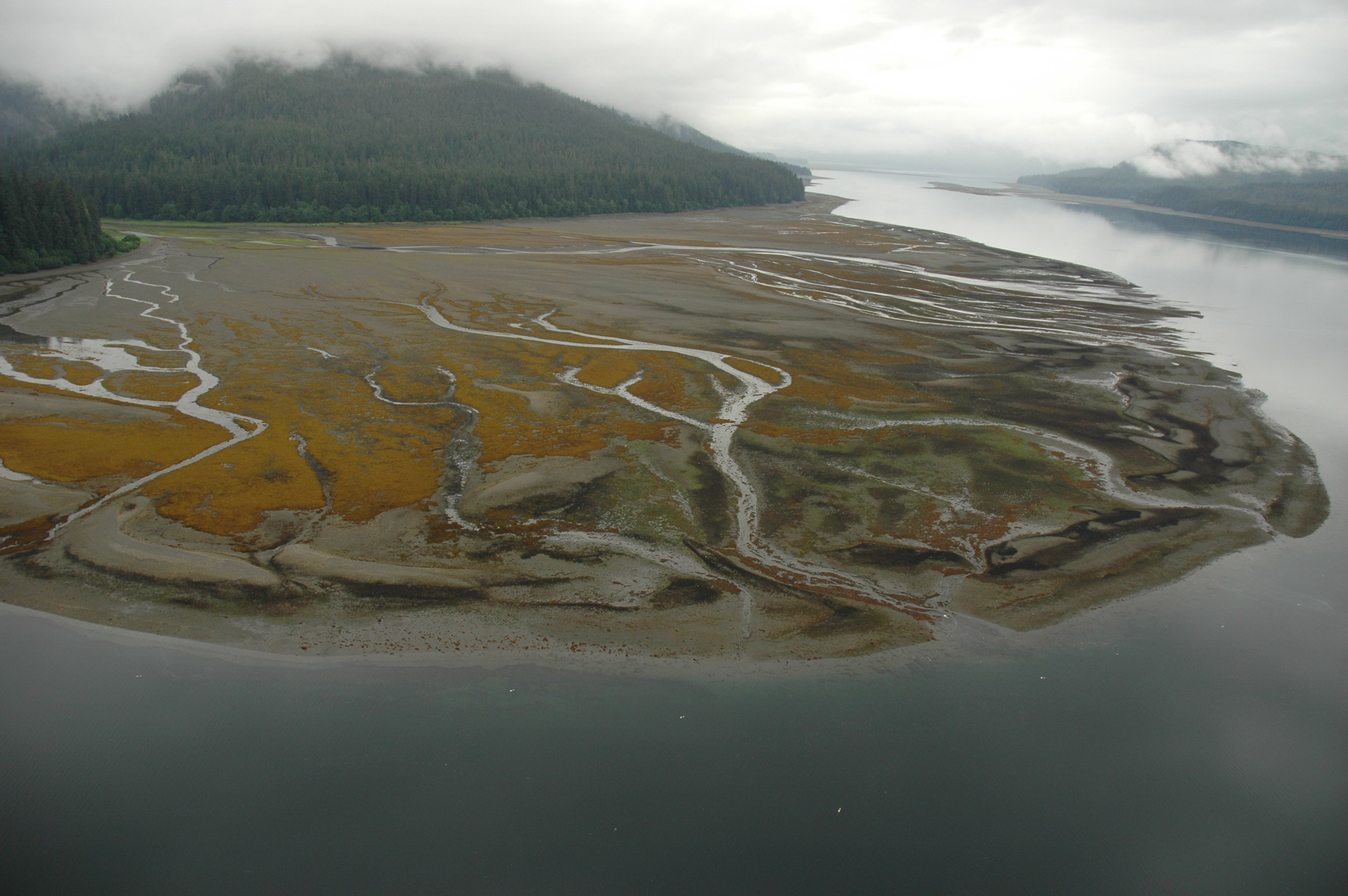
Braided stream and stream delta, showing floral zones in the marine algae at low water. Seymour Canal.

Seymour Canal is an inlet penetrating deep into the southeastern part of Admiralty Island, Southeast Alaska, United States.

The canal gave its name to the Seymour Canal Formation, a major geological formation composed of graywacke, argillite, and conglomerate rocks dating from the Late Jurassic and Early Cretaceous periods.

== History ==
The inlet was first charted in 1794 by Joseph Whidbey, master of HMS Discovery during George Vancouver's 1791–95 expedition. Vancouver later named it "Seymour's Channel", which evolved into the modern name Seymour Canal. Two large islands are located within it: Swan Island to the north, and Tiedeman Island just to its south.

== Wildlife ==
Seymour Canal is one of the world's highest concentrations of nesting bald eagles. There is also large populations of brown bears.
