= Admiralty Island =

Island in southeast Alaska, US

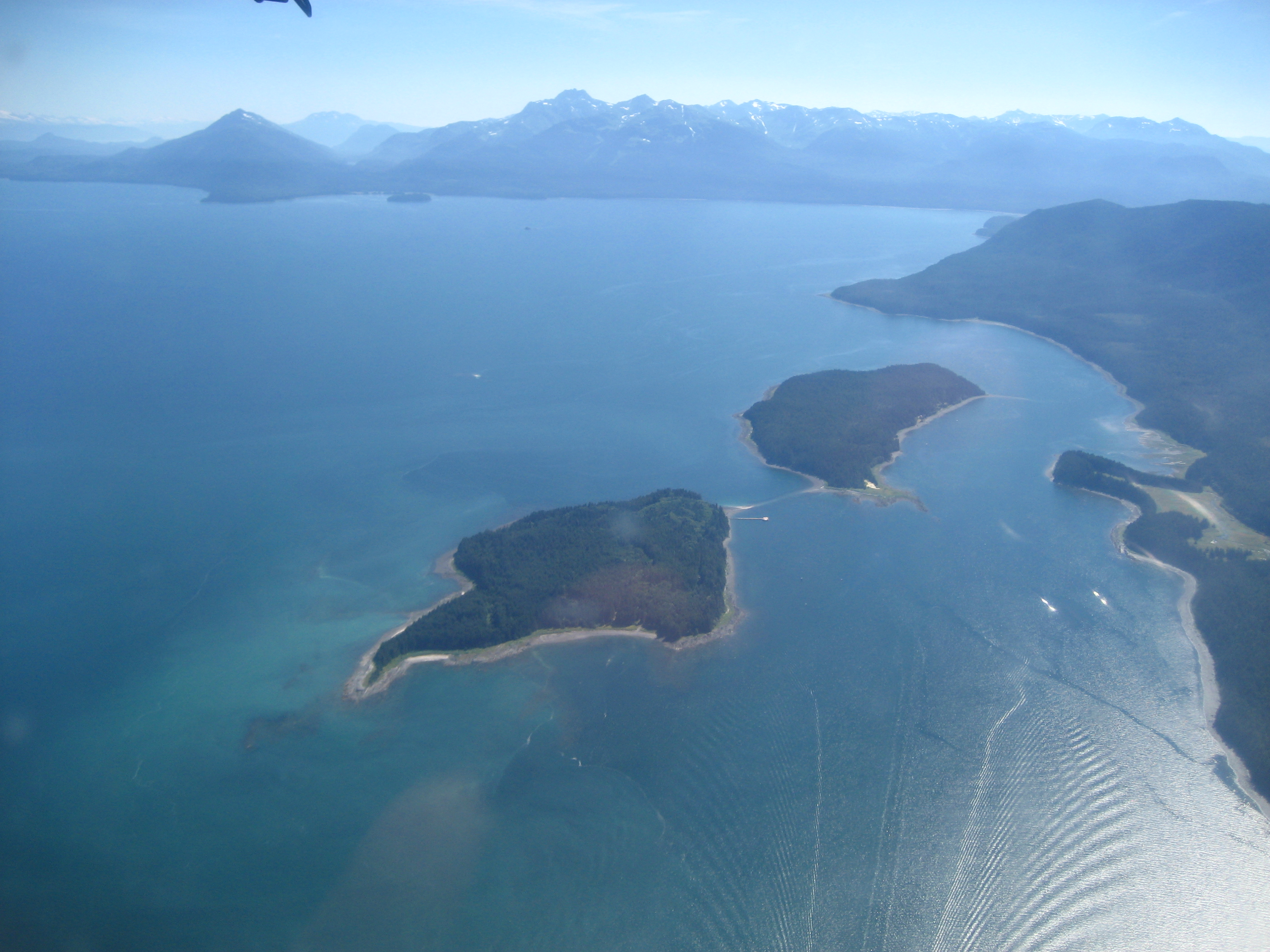
- Colt Island and Horse Island with Admiralty Island in the background

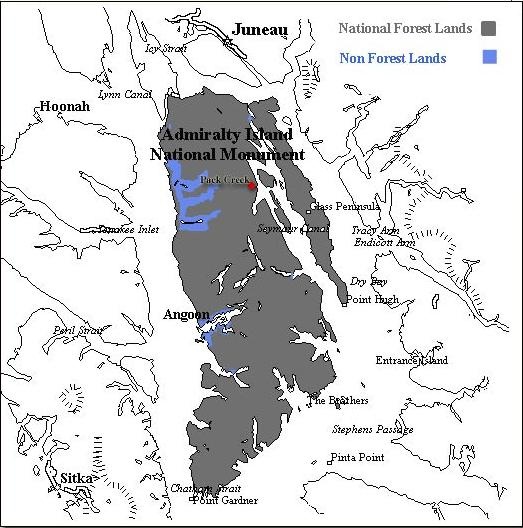

Geography
- Location: ABC islands of Alaska
- Coordinates: 57°44′N 134°20′W
- Archipelago: Alexander Archipelago
- Area: 1,646.4 sq mi (4,264 km^{2})
- Length: 90 mi (140 km)
- Width: 35 mi (56 km)
- Highest elevation: 4,800 ft (1460 m)

Administration
- United States
- State: Alaska
- Borough: Hoonah-Angoon Census Area and Juneau

Demographics
- Population: 650 (2000)
- Pop. density: 0.39/sq mi (0.151/km^{2})

Admiralty Island National Monument
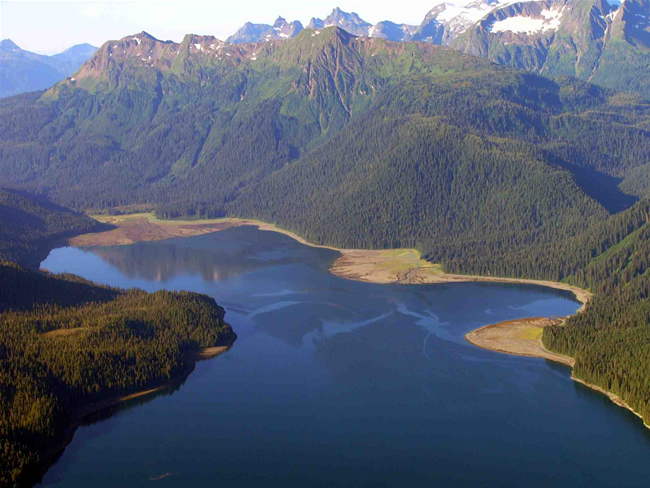
- Windfall Harbor

- Location within Alaska
- Interactive map of Admiralty Island National Monument
- Location: Alaska, United States
- Nearest city: Juneau, AK
- Coordinates: 57°37′05″N 134°09′40″W
- Area: 955,747 acres (3,867.77 km^{2})
- Governing body: U.S. Forest Service
- Website: www.fs.usda.gov/recarea/tongass/recarea/?recid=78614

U.S. National Monument
- Designated: 1978

Admiralty Island is an island in the Alexander Archipelago in Southeast Alaska. It is 145 km (90 mi) long and 56 km (35 mi) wide with an area of 4,264.1 km^{2} (1,646.4 sq mi), making it the seventh-largest island in the United States and the 132nd largest island in the world. It is one of the ABC islands in Alaska. The island is nearly cut in two by the Seymour Canal; to its east is the long, narrow Glass Peninsula. It's separated from Kupreanof Island in the south by Frederick Sound. Most of Admiralty Island—955,747 acres (3,868 km^{2})—is protected as the Admiralty Island National Monument administered by the Tongass National Forest. The Kootznoowoo Wilderness encompasses vast stands of old-growth temperate rainforest. These forests provide some of the best habitat available to species such as brown bears, bald eagles, and Sitka black-tailed deer.

Angoon, a traditional Tlingit community home to 572 people, is the only settlement on the island, although an unpopulated section of the city of Juneau comprises 264.68 km^{2} (102.19 sq mi) (6.2 percent) of the island's land area near its northern end. The island's total population at the 2000 census was 650.

The national monument is sacred to the Angoon Community Association, a Tlingit tribe, who live in Angoon on the western coast of the island. The Tlingits fought to make protection for the island a part of ANILCA legislation, and continue to engage in stewardship of the island's natural resources. Many of Angoon's residents make daily subsistence use of the national monument.

== History ==
The Tlingit language name for the island is Xootsnoowú, which is commonly interpreted as "Fortress of the Bear(s)", and gives its name to hooch.

The island was named by British naval officer George Vancouver in honor of his Royal Navy employers, the Admiralty. Joseph Whidbey, master of the Discovery during Vancouver's 1791–95 expedition, explored it in July–August 1794, in the process circumnavigating it.

The Admiralty Island National Monument was created December 1, 1978, by President Jimmy Carter. In the Alaska National Interest Lands Conservation Act Congress designated all but 18,351 acres (74.26 km^{2}) (74 km^{2}) of the monument as the Kootznoowoo Wilderness, ensuring that the vast bulk of this monument is permanently protected from development. The monument is administered by the U.S. Forest Service from offices in Juneau.

In 1986 it was named a biosphere reserve along with Glacier Bay National Park under the Man and the Biosphere Programme.

== Ecology ==
Western hemlock, Sitka spruce and western redcedar dominate the prolific rainforest vegetation; wildlife in abundance includes brown bear, bald eagles, many species of salmon, whales, and deer. Admiralty Island is home to the highest density of brown bears in North America. An estimated 1,600 brown bears inhabit the island, outnumbering Admiralty's human residents nearly three to one. It has more brown bears than the entire lower 48 states, and one of the highest densities of bald eagles in the world.

== Whaling ==
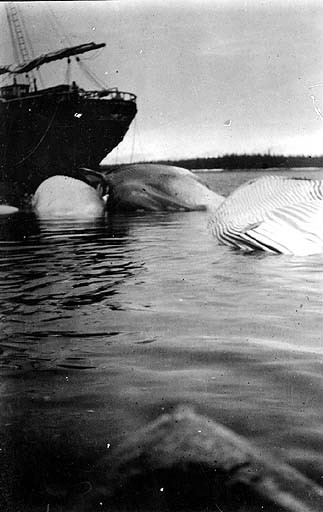
Whales tied to moorings at the Tyee Company whaling station, photo by John Nathan Cobb

Murder Cove is located at the southernmost portion of the island and was home to the Tyee Company whaling station.

== Mining ==
The Greens Creek mine is an underground silver, gold, zinc and lead mine located on the northwest end of the island, within the national monument. It began operations in 1989.

== Recreation ==
Admiralty Island offers opportunities for outdoor recreation. The 32-mile Cross Admiralty Canoe Route is a popular destination for backcountry canoeing and kayaking, traversing the breadth of the island through a series of lakes, streams and trail portages, with several cabins and shelters along the way. While the modern route was laid out and constructed by the Civilian Conservation Corps in the 1930s, it follows traces long used by the island's native inhabitants for hunting, fishing and trading.

The Pack Creek Brown Bear Viewing Area offers visitors the opportunity to observe brown bears in their natural habitat as they fish for salmon and interact with one another during the summer months. Permits are required for all visitors to Pack Creek; they can be obtained through the Forest Service.

Over recent decades, various fishing and outdoor recreation lodges have opened up on the island with most of these lodges operating in the Tlingit town of Angoon. There's also one lodge on a small, privately held plot of land within the national monument.

== Lighthouse ==
The Point Retreat Light is located on the northern tip of Admiralty and was an important aid-to-navigation.

== See also ==
- List of national monuments of the United States
- USS Gambier Bay- U.S. Navy aircraft carrier named after Gambier Bay, east of Angoon, Alaska, sunk in the Battle off Samar in October 1944

== General and cited sources ==
- Admiralty Island: Blocks 1000 to 1002, Census Tract 6, Juneau City and Borough; Blocks 3012 to 3018; 3022 to 3026; Block 3048; Blocks 3056 to 3069; Block 3074; Blocks 3087 and 3088; Census Tract 3, Skagway-Hoonah-Angoon Census Area, Alaska United States Census Bureau
- Comparison of Predicted and Actual Water Quality at Hardrock Mines
