= Prince of Wales Island (Alaska) =

Island in the United States of America

Native name: Taan (Tlingit)
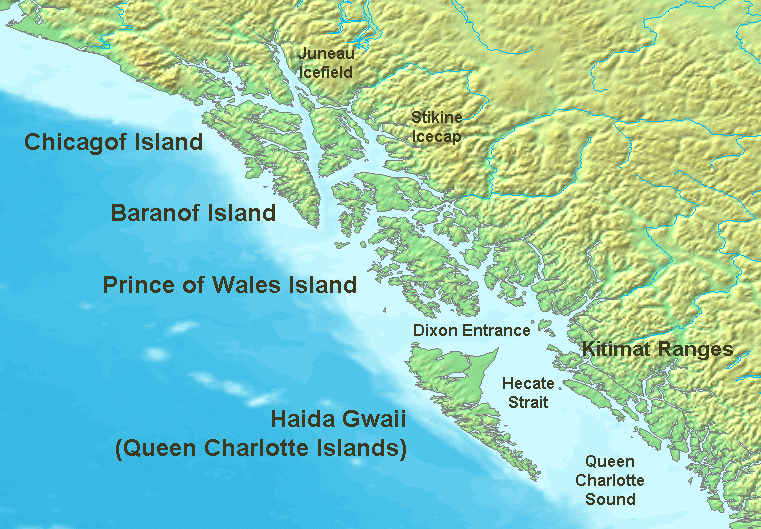
- Location of Prince of Wales Island
- Interactive map of Prince of Wales Island

Geography
- Coordinates: 55°37′55″N 132°54′27″W
- Area: 2,577 sq mi (6,670 km^{2})
- Length: 135 mi (217 km)
- Width: 65 mi (105 km)

Administration
- United States
- State: Alaska
- Census area: Prince of Wales-Hyder Census Area
- Largest settlement: Craig (pop. 1,036)

Demographics
- Population: 5,559
- Pop. density: 2.16/sq mi (0.834/km^{2})

Additional information
- Time zone: AKST (UTC-9)
  - Summer (DST): AKDT (UTC-8)
- ZIP Codes: 99921, 99925, 99928
- Area code: 907

Prince of Wales Island (Tlingit: Taan) is one of the islands of the Alexander Archipelago in the Alaska Panhandle. It is the fourth-largest island in the United States (after Hawaii, Kodiak Island, and Puerto Rico) and the 97th-largest island in the world.

== Geography and ecology ==
Prince of Wales Island is located in the Prince of Wales-Hyder Census Area. It measures 135 miles (217 km) long by 65 miles (105 km) wide, with an area of 2,577 sq mi (6,670 km^{2}), or about one-tenth the size of Ireland (or slightly larger than the state of Delaware). Approximately 6,000 people live on the island. Craig is the largest community; founded as a saltery in the early 20th century, it has a population of 1,500 people. Some 900 more live in Klawock, a long-established village that grew with the boom of the fishing industry. Hollis was a boom-and-bust mining town, most active from 1900 to about 1915. Abandoned, it was re-established as a logging camp in the 1950s; it now has a population of about 100, and is the location of a ferry terminal.

Mountains (all but the tallest of which were buried by Pleistocene glaciation) reach over 3,000 feet (910 m). Fjords, steep-sided and forested mountains, and dense stands of trees characterize the terrain on the island. Extensive tracts of limestone include karst features, such as El Capitan Pit (at 598.3 feet (182.4 m) high), which is possibly the deepest vertical shaft in the United States.

Moist, maritime conditions dominate the weather, with marine layer and fog being regular occurrences.

The Tongass National Forest covers most of the island. Parts of the forest, and the island itself, encompass the Karta River Wilderness and the South Prince of Wales Wilderness. Many of the native species, such as the Prince of Wales flying squirrel (Glaucomys sabrinus griseifrons) and Prince of Wales Island ermine (Mustela haidarum celenda) are found nowhere else. Other terrestrial mammalian species include the American black bear (Ursus americanus) and grizzly bear (U. arctos terribilis), black-tailed deer (Odocoileus hemionus sitkensis), beaver (Castor canadensis), gray wolf (Canis lupus), marten (both Martes americana and M. caurina), mink (Neogale vison), moose (A. alces), mountain goat (Oreamnos americanus), porcupine (Erithizon dorstatum), red squirrel (Tamiasciurus hudsonicus), river otter (Lontra canadensis), among others. The waters surrounding the island are home to many marine species, such as Dall's (Phocoenoides dalli) and harbor porpoises (P. phocoena), harbor seal (Phoca vitulina), humpback whale (Megaptera novaeangliae), orca (Orcinus orca), Pacific white-side dolphin (Sagmatias obliquidens), sea otter (Enhydra lutris) and Steller sea lion (Eumetopias jubatus), to name a few.

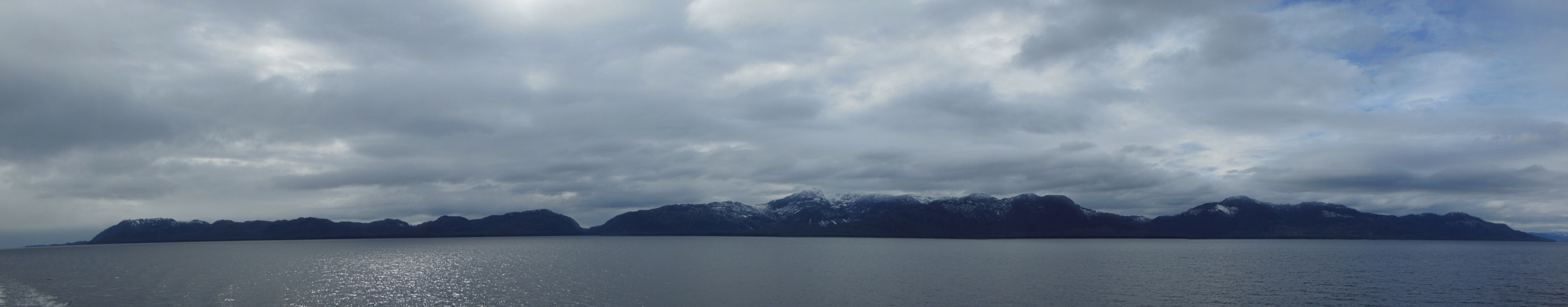
Panorama of the Kasaan Peninsula on the eastern shore of the island

== History ==
Prince of Wales Island is the homeland of the indigenous Tlingit people. The Tlingit name for the island is Taan, meaning "sea lion". The island is traditional Tlingit territory. The Haida migrated into the area in the late 18th century. Abandoned Haida villages still have Tlingit names.

In 1741, Aleksei Chirikov, commanding a ship on Vitus Bering's second voyage of exploration out of Kamchatka, made the first recorded European landfall on the northwest coast of North America at Baker Island off the west coast of Prince of Wales Island. He did not stop for any length of time there. The next European arrival was in 1774, when Juan Pérez led a Spanish expedition sailing in a 39-foot (12 m) boat from La Paz, Mexico (then a Spanish colony). They reached Suemez Island off of Prince of Wales' west coast.

In 1779 a British expedition under Captain James Cook passed Prince of Wales Island. Comte de La Perouse led a French expedition to the area in 1786. Karta Bay is the site of the first salmon saltery in Alaska.

On September 20, 1793, British navy officer George Vancouver gave the name "Prince of Wales Archipelago" to all the islands of the southern Alexander Archipelago, which he suspected to have a single major island; the name referred to George, Prince of Wales, who would later become King George IV. By 1825 the name "Prince of Wales Island" was being used for the largest of the islands in Vancouver's archipelago.

Settlers began mining of gold, copper, and other metals on the island in the late 19th century, as European Americans entered the area to exploit the natural resources. Gold production came from underground lode mines exploiting: gold-bearing quartz veins in metamorphic rocks (such as the Gold Standard, Sea Level, Dawson, Golden Fleece and Goldstream mines); skarns (at the Jumbo and Kassan Peninsula copper-gold mines); zoned mafic-ultramafic plutons, as at the Salt Chuck silver-gold-copper-PGE mine; and VMS deposits such as Niblack. Uranium was mined at Bokan Mountain in the 1950s and 1970s.

== Economy ==
=== Logging ===
Historically, logging was the mainstay of the collective Prince of Wales economy through most of the 20th century. The decline of the industry since the late 20th century has resulted in only a few small-scale sawmills operating. In 1975, the Point Baker Association and others sued the United States Forest Service to prevent logging 400,000 acres (1,600 km^{2}) on the northern portion of the island.

In December 1975, Judge von der Heydt issued a ruling enjoining all clearcutting on the 400,000 acres (1,600 km^{2}) on Northern Prince of Wales Island west of a line from the west side of Red Bay to the easternmost point of Calder Bay. In March 1976, the United States Congress responded to the suit by passing the National Forest Management Act, which removed the injunction. Still, only half of the marketable timber was cut on the north end of the island.

Road construction and logging on the north end of the island at Labouchere Bay commenced early in 1975. Living on a floating camp beginning with the retired tugboat Irene leased as a floating hotel, employees of Robertson & Sons began cutting trees, clearing stumps, and blasting rock in order to build pads for mobile trailers for both the road construction and logging families. The camps were ready in early June for Robertson employees to bring in their families. Under the supervision of the US Forest Service, the Tuxecan logging company began logging in 1976.

In 2010, Senators Lisa Murkowski and Mark Begich introduced S730 to privatize stands of old growth forests on the island.

=== Tourism ===
Tourism, including sport fishing, is an important part in Prince of Wales' economy. Two factors have led to the increase of tourism on the island. Roads built for the logging companies years ago have enabled better access to different parts of the island for hiking and camping. The second was the new Inter-Island Ferry Authority.

=== Fishing ===
Commercial fishing provides the foundation of the economy for numerous towns on the island including Craig, Klawock, Hydaburg, Port Protection and Point Baker. During the summer, trollers and seiners both fish for all five species of Pacific salmon. Longliners bring up halibut and black cod. Dungeness crab and shrimp seasons are open throughout the year. During the winter there are dive fisheries for geoducks, sea cucumbers, and sea urchins.

=== Government ===
Since Prince of Wales Island is almost entirely made up of federal land, the two ranger districts (Craig and Thorne Bay) on the island provide employment for a number of residents.

The island is home to four federally recognized Alaska Native tribes:

- Craig Tribal Association
- Hydaburg Cooperative Association
- Klawock Cooperative Association
- Organized Village of Kasaan

=== Mining ===
Mineral exploration continues at many projects on Prince of Wales Island. The only producing uranium mine in the entire state of Alaska was located on the island, the Ross-Adams mine in Kendrick Bay. Current remediation projects have been reported in local media, and continued exploration of rare earth metals continue in the region. Bokan Mountain has been rated by the Technology Metals report as a location (tied with Canada's Strange Lake) containing the third highest of "relative" quantity of individual critical rare earth oxides, a way of comparing rare earth mine reserves. In 2012 the Pentagon issued a contract to perform a mineralogical and metallurgical study of the mountain. "The Bokan – Dotson ridge REE" rare earth deposit on Bokan Mountain owned by Ucore is estimated to hold 5.3 million short tons (4.8 million metric tons) of heavy rare earths with 207,000 short tons (188,000 t) dysprosium. It is a small deposit on a global basis but the largest in the United States. As of August 2019, the mine was still in the planning stages. Ucore Rare Metals Inc. paid about $1 million for a 9,421-acre (38.13 km^{2}) claim to the family of a prospector who held uranium claims for many years on Bokan Mountain.

== Transportation ==
=== Roads ===
A road system, which taxpayers paid for in credits to logging contractors, was built on the island. However, many of these roads are now being decommissioned as unnecessary in the post-clearcutting era. Only a small percentage of this road system is paved, currently no further than the Whale Pass turn-off. The gravel roads cost between 150,000 and 500,000 per mile in today's dollars. Point Baker and Port Protection chose in 1974 not to be connected to the road system.

There is now a newly designated state "scenic highway"—the 500-kilometer (310 mi) Prince of Wales Island road system. The highway reaches almost every community on Prince of Wales.

=== Cargo ===
A few companies provide scheduled barge service from Pacific coast ports to southeastern Alaskan ports, including those on Prince of Wales island, primarily Craig and Thorne Bay.

=== Public ferry ===
==== Alaska Marine Highway System ====
Historically, the Alaska Marine Highway (AMHS) intermittently served the port of Hollis, until the Inter-Island Ferry Authority began regular scheduled service.

==== Inter-Island Ferry Authority ====
The Inter-Island Ferry Authority (IFA) provides daily service on a three-hour, 36-mile (58 km) route between Prince of Wales Island and Ketchikan. The idea of starting a shuttle ferry service was discussed among communities of Klawock, Craig, Thorne Bay, Coffman Cove on the Prince of Wales Island as well as Petersburg and Wrangell in 1997, which would serve on regular timetable. Budget was fixed with the Alaska Congressional delegation as the state Department of Transportation supported the plan to be organized under the Municipal Port Authority Act of Alaska in 1998, and two vessels introduced between 2002 and 2006 have expanded routes from Hollis–Ketchikan to serve north by Clark Bay.

=== Airports ===
Klawock Airport (IATA: KLW, ICAO: PAKW, FAA LID: AKW) is the only airport on Prince of Wales Island. At least two commercial airlines in Ketchikan provide scheduled service to Prince of Wales Island. Air taxi or chartered flights are also available from them and other airlines.

==== Seaplane bases ====
FAA	IATA	ICAO	Seaplane Base
KCC			Coffman Cove
CGA			Craig
HYL			Hollis
HYG		PAHY	Hydaburg
KXA			Kasaan
AQC		PAQC	Klawock
KPB			Point Baker
19P			Port Protection
KTB			Thorne Bay
KWF			Waterfall

==== Scheduled airlines ====
Airline	Hub(s)	Prince of Wales Island Airports
Island Air Express	Klawock	Ketchikan Daily Scheduled Service from Klawock to Ketchikan
Taquan Air	Ketchikan	Coffman Cove, Craig, Edna Bay, Hollis, Hydaburg, Naukati Bay, Point Baker, Port Protection, Thorne Bay, Whale Pass

== Communities ==
- Coffman Cove
- Craig
- Hollis
- Hydaburg
- Kasaan
- Klawock
- Naukati Bay
- Point Baker
- Port Protection
- Port St. Nicholas
- Thorne Bay
- Waterfall
- Whale Pass

== Notable ex-residents ==
- Holly Madison, American model and Hugh Hefner's former girlfriend.
- Elizabeth Peratrovich and Roy Peratrovich, early Alaskan civil rights advocates, heavily involved in passage of Alaska's Anti-Discrimination Act of 1945, the first civil rights law in the U.S.

== See also ==
- On Your Knees Cave (Shuká Káa)
