= Waterfall Seaplane Base =

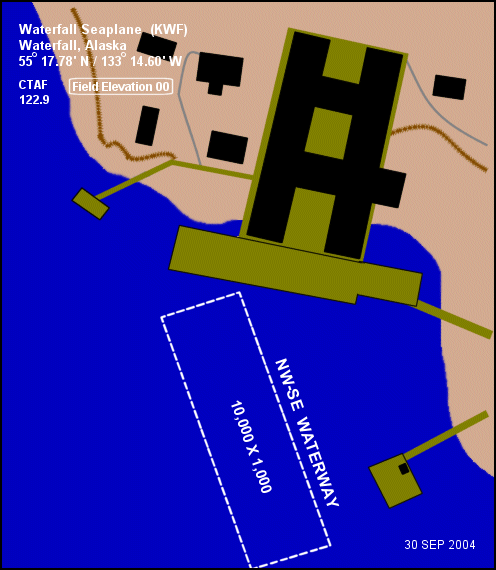
- IATA: KWF; ICAO: none; FAA LID: KWF

Summary
- Airport type: Public
- Owner: Waterfall Cannery Resort
- Serves: Waterfall, Alaska
- Elevation AMSL: 0 ft / 0 m
- Coordinates: 55°17′47″N 133°14′36″W

Map
- Location of airport in Alaska

Runways
Direction	Length		Surface
Direction	ft	m	Surface
NW/SE	1,000	3,048	Water

Statistics (2006)
- Aircraft operations: 1,600
- Enplanements (2008): 2,072
- Source: Federal Aviation Administration

Waterfall Seaplane Base (IATA: KWF, FAA LID: KWF) is a public-use seaplane base located in Waterfall on Prince of Wales Island in the Prince of Wales-Hyder Census Area of the U.S. state of Alaska. It is owned by the Waterfall Cannery Resort.

As per Federal Aviation Administration records, Waterfall SPB had 2,072 passenger boardings (enplanements) in calendar year 2008, a decrease of 7% from the 2,237 enplanements in 2007.

== Facilities and aircraft ==
Waterfall Seaplane Base has one seaplane landing area designated NW/SE, which measures 10,000 by 1,000 feet (3,048 x 305 m). It is unattended and the dock is removed in winter months (October through March). For the 12-month period ending December 31, 2006, it had 1,600 aircraft operations, an average of 133 per month: 94% air taxi and 6% general aviation.

== See also ==
- List of airports in Alaska
