= KWF =

KWF may refer to:

- Waterfall Seaplane Base, Alaska (by IATA and FAA airport code)
- Killed while flying, see aviation accidents and incidents for related information
- Korea Wrestling Federation, Korean United World Wrestling member
- Kwara'ae language, by ISO 639-3 language code
- Kwai Fong station, Hong Kong (by MTR station code)
- Commission on the Filipino Language (Komisyon sa Wikang Filipino)
