= KPB =

KPB may refer to:

- Communist Party of Belarus (Belarusian: Kamunistychnaya Partyia Belarusi)
- Communist Party of Belgium (Dutch: Kommunistische Partij van België)
- Communist Party of Bulgaria (Bulgarian: Komunisticeska Partija na Balgarija)
- Kampung Bandan railway station, Jakarta, Indonesia, station code
- Point Baker Seaplane Base, Alaska, US, IATA and LID codes
- Kamla Persad-Bissessar, current prime minister of Trinidad and Tobago
- Kevin-Prince Boateng, German-Ghanaian former footballer
