= Kasaan Peninsula =

Coordinates: 55.5556°N 132.3450°W

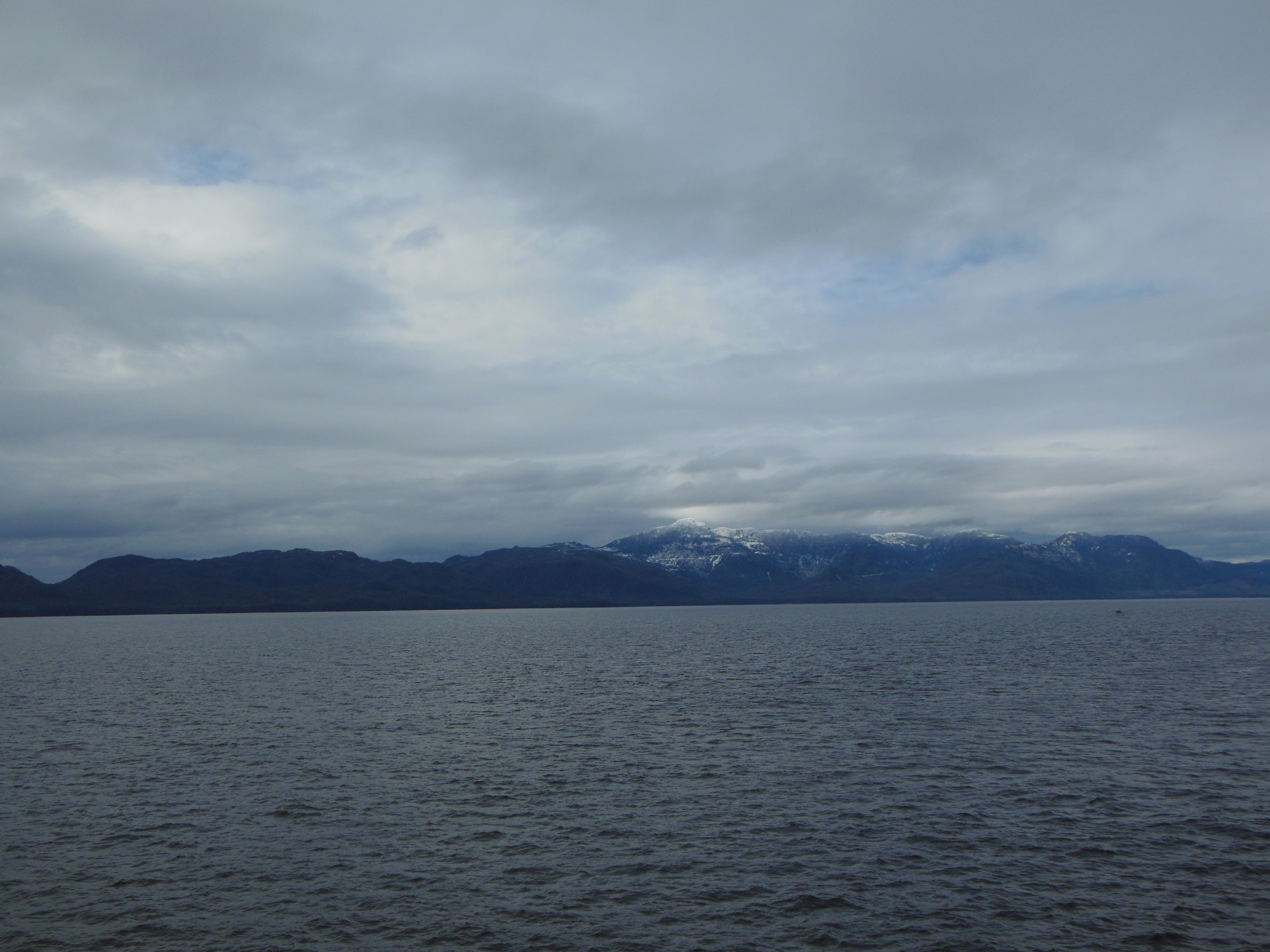
Kasaan Peninsula

Kasaan Peninsula lies between Clarence Strait and Kasaan Bay in the U.S. state of Alaska. It forms a cut out from the eastern coast of Prince of Wales Island on the south, and by Tolstoi Bay and Thome Bay on the north. A low mountain range forms the backbone of the peninsula, with altitudes ranging from 1,500–2,000 feet (460–610 m). The southern and western shore line is abrupt and almost unbroken, and has practically no shelter from southeasterly storms which sweep up Kasaan Bay. The northeastern coast of the peninsula also rises abruptly from the water, but is broken by a number of indentations, some of which form small harbors. The first discovery of copper deposits in the Ketchikan district was made by the Russians on the southern side of Kasaan Peninsula. Kasaan is the largest settlement on the peninsula.

== Topography ==
Kasaan Peninsula is a promontory on the east side of Prince of Wales Island that includes about 60 square miles (160 km^{2})square miles. From Clarence Strait, it appears to be an island whose summits are highest near its central part and diminish in height toward the north and south. A neck of low land between the head of Kasaan Bay and the south end of Thorne Bay connects the peninsula with Prince of Wales Island. This low pass appears to represent the continuation of a valley, from 8–10 miles (13–16 km) wide, which is a tributary to the north branch of Thorne Bay and extends northwestward through the center of Prince of Wales Island. Kasaan Bay occupies the south end of this valley. In the northward extension of this valley and on the low pass south of Thorne Bay, there are many small lakes and morainal deposits. The highest point on the peninsula is the top of Kasaan Mountain, which has an altitude of 2,840 feet (870 m). The other mountains average about 2,000 feet (610 m) in height and their slopes are deeply dissected by small valleys and by narrow steep-sided gulches.

== Erosion ==
On Kasaan Peninsula, there are many flat areas, some of them containing small lakes, and the mountain slopes themselves are interrupted by benches or terraces, which occur at different elevations and at rather regular intervals above sea level. These benches represent levels of erosion. The lowest bench level is indicated by a series of flats or forelands at a height of about 50 feet (15 m) above sea level. Forelands at this height are especially prominent at the head of Kasaan Bay and on the adjacent islands. Along the northern shore of the peninsula and in Tolstoi Bay, a higher level of erosion, which seems persistent at 100–150 feet (30–46 m) on many parts of the peninsula, is marked by wide flats in the valleys, some of which are occupied by small lakes. Such flats occur just north of Grindall Point; on the hills just north of Kasaan; northeast of the Haida mine, where the flat is covered by a lake; on both the east and west slopes of Tolstoi Bay; and southwest of Thorne Bay, where there are two large lakes. Still higher, at an elevation of 250–300 feet (76–91 m), a level of erosion is represented by a flat, occupied by a lake, at the head of Poor Mans Creek, on the divide toward Tolstoi Bay; by flats north of the Alarm claim, on which there are several lakes; and by several areas occupied by lakes northeast of the Haida mine. The surface of the lake just east of Lake Three, at the head of Kasaan Bay, and that of the lake below the Goodro mine are also at this elevation.

The next or fourth series of benches and flats are prominent at an elevation of about 500 feet (150 m) above sea level. At this level also there are lakes, from which small streams flow down through gulch-like valleys to lower levels. At this altitude, there are terraces along the north slope of the southwest half of the peninsula, flats south of Hadley, a low pass across the peninsula southwest of Lyman Anchorage, and the lakes and flats on the divide from Windfall Harbor to Tolstoi Bay and east of the It mine. Most of the summits of the hills north of the It mine and adjacent to the Salt chucks at the head of Kasaan Bay are at an elevation of about 500 feet (150 m). Higher levels of erosion are indicated at elevations of 1,100–1,300 feet (340–400 m) by lakes and flats in the central portion of the southeast half of the peninsula, by flats that are in part occupied by lakes on Mount Andrew and on the mountain just west of Lyman Anchorage, and at the head of a branch of Tolstoi River. Other lakes at an altitude of about 1,500 feet (460 m) north of Grindall Point Mountains and north of Kasaan Mountain may mark a higher erosion level. The highest relatively level areas stand at an altitude of about 1,850 feet (560 m), on the Grindall Point Mountains, where there are also small lakes, and also on the ridge southeast of Kasaan Mountain and on Tolstoi Mountain.

== Glaciation ==
The mountain mass of Kasaan Peninsula exhibits characteristic glaciated topography. The entire peninsula was at one time overridden by ice streams is evident from the glacial erratics which lie on the highest summits, the moraine deposits which occur on the lower levels, and the many basins which stand at various elevations on the mountain slopes and are now occupied by lakes. During the period in which this area lay beneath the ice many of the minor topographic features, such as the earlier erosion level, were partly destroyed. Some of the valleys were more deeply eroded, lake basins were formed, and wide areas of glacial silt and debris were laid down. This section of the ice stream is well represented in the northern extension of the valley of Kasaan Bay, which is occupied by a chain of connecting lakes, on the sides of which thick beds of glacial clay and debris have been exposed by subsequent stream erosion. This valley probably represents a preglacial river floor, and only the lake basins and minor physiographic features can be attributed to ice erosion. Erosive action subsequent to the ice period has formed the gulches and ravines which are everywhere prominent on the mountain slopes. Another noteworthy feature of Kasaan Peninsula is its precipitous southwest slope, which is much steeper than that on the northeast. This difference may be due to the fact that the ice stream remained longer in the valley of Kasaan Bay than in that of Clarence Strait, the action of the ice tending to deepen the valley and at the same time to protect the mountain slopes from surface erosion.

== Flora ==
Kasaan Peninsula is densely forested with spruce and hemlock, principally hemlock, which extends to elevations of 1,500–1,800 feet (460–550 m) The timber, especially that on the southwest side, toward Grindall Point, is large and straight. The mountain side is steep down to salt water. The mountain summits and ridges above timber line are fairly open and bear relatively little vegetation as compared with that of the densely forested lower levels, groups of scrubby pine and juniper and a low berry bush being the principal plants found.

== Conservation ==
Prince of Wales Island was included in the Tongass National Forest, but in 1908 that portion of Kasaan Peninsula, which lies south of the Hole in the Wall, was taken out of the national forest.
