= Naukati Bay, Alaska =

Naukati Bay, Alaska Nàakig̱èey
- Census-designated place
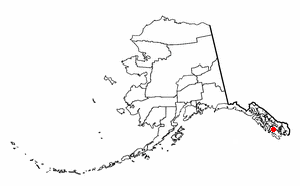
- Location of Naukati Bay in Alaska, United States

- Location of Naukati Bay in the state of Alaska, United States
- Coordinates: 55°52′25″N 133°11′05″W
- Country: United States
- State: Alaska
- Borough: Unorganized
- Census Area: Prince of Wales-Hyder
- Settled

Government
  - State senator: Bert Stedman (R)
  - State rep.: Rebecca Himschoot (I)

Area
  - Total: 5.09 sq mi (13.18 km^{2})
  - Land: 4.79 sq mi (12.41 km^{2})
  - Water: 0.30 sq mi (0.78 km^{2})
- Elevation: 207 ft (63 m)

Population (2020)
  - Total: 142
  - Density: 29.6/sq mi (11.44/km^{2})
- Time zone: UTC-9 (Alaska (AKST))
  - Summer (DST): UTC-8 (AKDT)
- ZIP code: 99950
- Area code: 907
- FIPS code: 02-52845
- GNIS feature ID: 1866964

Naukati Bay (Lingít: Nàakig̱èey) is a census-designated place (CDP) in the Prince of Wales-Hyder Census Area of the Unorganized Borough of the U.S. state of Alaska. The population was 142 at the 2020 census.

Also known as Naukati or Naukati West, the community lies approximately 30 miles (48 km) north of Craig and 20 miles (32 km) southwest of Coffman Cove on Prince of Wales Island, within the Unorganized Borough. Naukati Bay Subdivision East and West are located on the east side of Tuxekan Passage in Naukati Bay. The community of Naukati Bay has developed over the past 30 years from its original logging camp status to an independent community. Primary local access is via unpaved gravel logging roads. The area was extensively clear cut over the past 30 years, and the resulting regrowth is quite dense. Vegetation is typical temperate rain forest.

== Climate ==
The area is dominated by a cool, maritime climate. Average temperatures in the summer range from 46 to 70; winter temperatures range from 32 to 42.

== Geography ==
Naukati Bay is located at 55°52′25″N 133°11′5″W, elevation: 207 feet (63 m) (Section 18, Township 069 South, Range 080 East, Copper River Meridian) between a pair of sheltered bays (Little Naukati Bay and Naukati Bay) on the West coast of Prince of Wales Island in South-East Alaska. Naukati Bay is located in the Ketchikan Recording District.

Naukati Bay, census-designated place (CDP) tract's Centroid is at 55°52′57″N 133°11′42″W, elevation: 13 feet (4.0 m) The United States Census Bureau adjusted the census-designated place tract's boundaries from 1990 to 2008, resulting in the shift of the CDP's Centroid coordinates seen above, i.e. the ground has not moved, but the places where the Census counts has.

According to the United States Census Bureau, the CDP has a total area of 5.1 square miles (13 km^{2}), of which, 4.8 square miles (12 km^{2}) of it is land and 0.2 square miles (0.52 km^{2}) of it (4.95%) is water.

=== Naukati Bay ===
Naukati Bay is a natural sheltered harbor at Naukati Bay, Alaska, on the Western shores of Prince of Wales Island, on the Pacific Ocean at 55°52′34″N 133°9′27″W, elevation: 0 feet (0 m)

Naukati Bay is the largest indentation in the East shore of Tuxekan Passage. Its entrance, about 2 miles (3.2 km) North of Staney Island, is constricted by rocks and kelp, and the entire area has numerous islets, reefs, and rocks. In the narrow winding channel, 3 fathoms can be carried well in toward the head of the bay.

==== Naukati Creek ====
Naukati Creek is a stream with its mouth at 55°53′19″N 133°8′52″W, elevation (at mouth): 16 feet (4.9 m), which originates from a small lake at 55°53′36″N 133°5′26″W, elevation:, and flows 3.5 miles (5.6 km) West to Naukati Bay.

===== History =====
It was a logging camp at one time, but later was settled as an Alaska Department of Natural Resources land disposal site.

====== Name ======
Named "Naukatee Bay" in 1904 by the U.S. Coast & Geodetic Survey, who recorded it as the local Indian name. Local name recorded in 1949 by United States Geological Survey.

=== Little Naukati Bay ===
Little Naukati Bay is a natural sheltered harbor at Naukati Bay, Alaska, on the Western shores of Prince of Wales Island, on the Pacific Ocean at 55°52′36″N 133°12′45″W, elevation: 20 feet (6.1 m)

Little Naukati Bay, on the East side of Tuxekan Narrows and about 6.5 miles (10.5 km) North of Kauda Point, is not recommended as a small-boat anchorage. At low water its entrance is almost closed by rocks and reefs. The best water into it is the North channel. The narrows North-West of Little Naukati Bay is relatively clear and deep.

== Demographics ==
Historical population
| Census | Pop. | Note | %± |
|---|---|---|---|
| 1990 | 93 | | — |
| 2000 | 135 | | 45.2% |
| 2010 | 113 | | −16.3% |
| 2020 | 142 | | 25.7% |
U.S. Decennial Census

Naukati Bay first reported on the 1990 U.S. Census as a census-designated place (CDP).

As of the census of 2000, there were 135 people, 60 households, and 34 families residing in the CDP. The population density was 28.1 inhabitants per square mile (10.8/km^{2}). There were 78 housing units at an average density of 16.3 per square mile (6.3/km^{2}), and 18 vacant housing units. The racial makeup of the CDP was 86.67% White, 0.74% Black or African American, 9.63% Native American, 2.22% Asian, 0.74% from other races. 0.74% of the population were Hispanic or Latino of any race.

There were 60 households, out of which 36.7% had children under the age of 18 living with them, 36.7% were married couples living together, 6.7% had a female householder with no husband present, and 43.3% were non-families. 41.7% of all households were made up of individuals, and 5.0% had someone living alone who was 65 years of age or older. The average household size was 2.25 and the average family size was 3.03.

In the CDP, the age distribution of the population shows 32.6% under the age of 18, 1.5% from 18 to 24, 34.8% from 25 to 44, 28.9% from 45 to 64, and 2.2% who were 65 years of age or older. The median age was 37 years. For every 100 females, there were 150.0 males. For every 100 females age 18 and over, there were 160.0 males.

The median income for a household in the CDP was $27,500, and the median income for a family was $32,917. Males had a median income of $51,875 versus $0 for females. The per capita income for the CDP was $15,950. There were 6.9% of families and 9.4% of the population living below the poverty line, including no under eighteens and none of those over 64.

== Culture ==
Naukati residents are logging families and homesteaders. Two community non-profit associations have been organized for planning and local issue purposes. Sale of alcohol is restricted to the local package store.

== Infrastructure ==
=== Water and Sewer ===
Water is derived from rain catchment and several small streams. The 9 logging camp homes are connected to a piped water and sewer system with full plumbing. The 27 homesteaders collect rainwater or haul water and use outhouses. Funds have been requested to study alternatives for a treated community water source and sewage disposal system.

=== Refuse ===
The community burns its refuse and ships the ash to Thorne Bay's landfill.

=== Utilities ===
Electricity is provided by Alaska Power Company.

=== Schools ===
There is one school located in the community, attended by 28 students. The school is the Naukati School, operated by Southeast Island School District.

=== Health Care ===
Auxiliary health care is provided by Naukati EMS (629-4234).

== Economy ==
Small sawmills and related logging and lumber services are the sole income sources. Employment is seasonal. Naukati is a log transfer site for several smaller camps on the Island. Homesteading families arrived in the 1990s.

U.S. Census data for Year 2000 showed 39 residents as employed. The unemployment rate at that time was 29.09 percent, although 60.2 percent of all adults were not in the work force. The median household income was $27,500, per capita income was $15,949, and 9.45 percent of residents were living below the poverty level.

=== Transportation ===
Naukati is accessed primarily by float plane or off of the North Island Road.

== Notes ==
A: Researching earliest settlement with Alaska Department of Natural Resources and U.S. government records.
