= Karta Bay =

Coordinates: 55.5719°N 132.5414°W

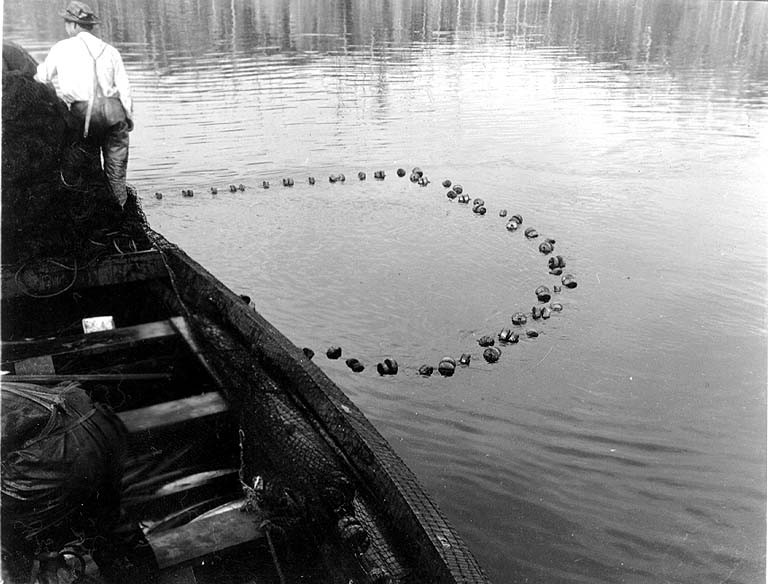
Purse seining in Karta Bay, July 1910

Karta Bay is a western arm of Kasaan Bay, an eastern inlet on Prince of Wales Island off the southern coast of the U.S. state of Alaska. Situated about 200 miles (320 km) from Sitka, it contains a bronze copper mine, which was considered valuable in the late 19th century. Karta Bay is the site of the first salmon saltery in Alaska.

== Geography ==
Karta Bay is situated at the northwestern end of Kasaan Bay, of which it forms a part. A saltery on the cove directly east of Karta Bay proper, known as Karta Bay or Baronovich Fishery, was one of the first operated in southeast Alaska. A redfish stream empties into the head of Karta Bay about a mile from the saltery.
