= Karta River Wilderness =

Wilderness area in Alaska, United States

Coordinates: 55°34′30″N 132°44′00″W

Karta River Wilderness is a U. S. wilderness area within the Tongass National Forest, centrally located on Prince of Wales Island. It is 8 miles (13 km) north of Hollis, Alaska just west of the Kasaan Peninsula and may be accessed by a quick 10-minute plane ride or 30-minute boat ride. The wilderness was established by Congress in 1990, as part of the Tongass Timber Reform Act.

The Karta River flows from the Klawock Mountains down through Salmon and Karta Lakes to the sea. Rich and full of salmon, this artery carries the lifeblood of the Karta Valley. Attracted by its bounty, the Kaigani Haida of Kasaan fished this river and hunted the forest it supports. Later non-natives came, drawn by the same desires to hunt and fish and they built cabins, roads and mines. Today only a few cabins remain on the shores of the lakes and river so that visitors may stay for a short time and continue to seek out the heartbeat of the wilderness.

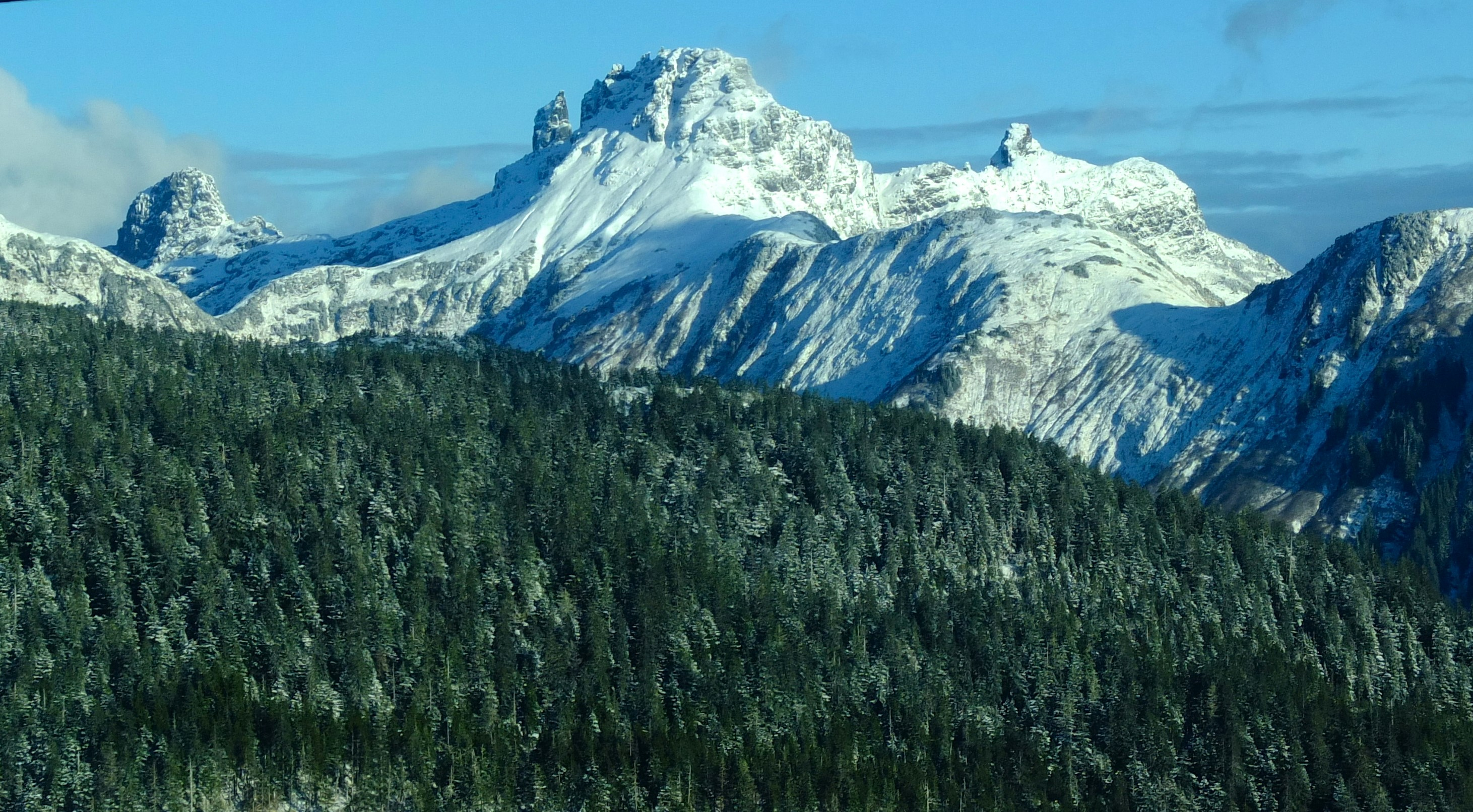
Large peak is unofficially called Castle Mountain with the sharp Pin Peak alongside it. Castle Mountain (3,866 feet) is the highest point of Karta River Wilderness.
