= Prince of Wales–Hyder Census Area, Alaska =

Census area in Alaska, United States

- Borough
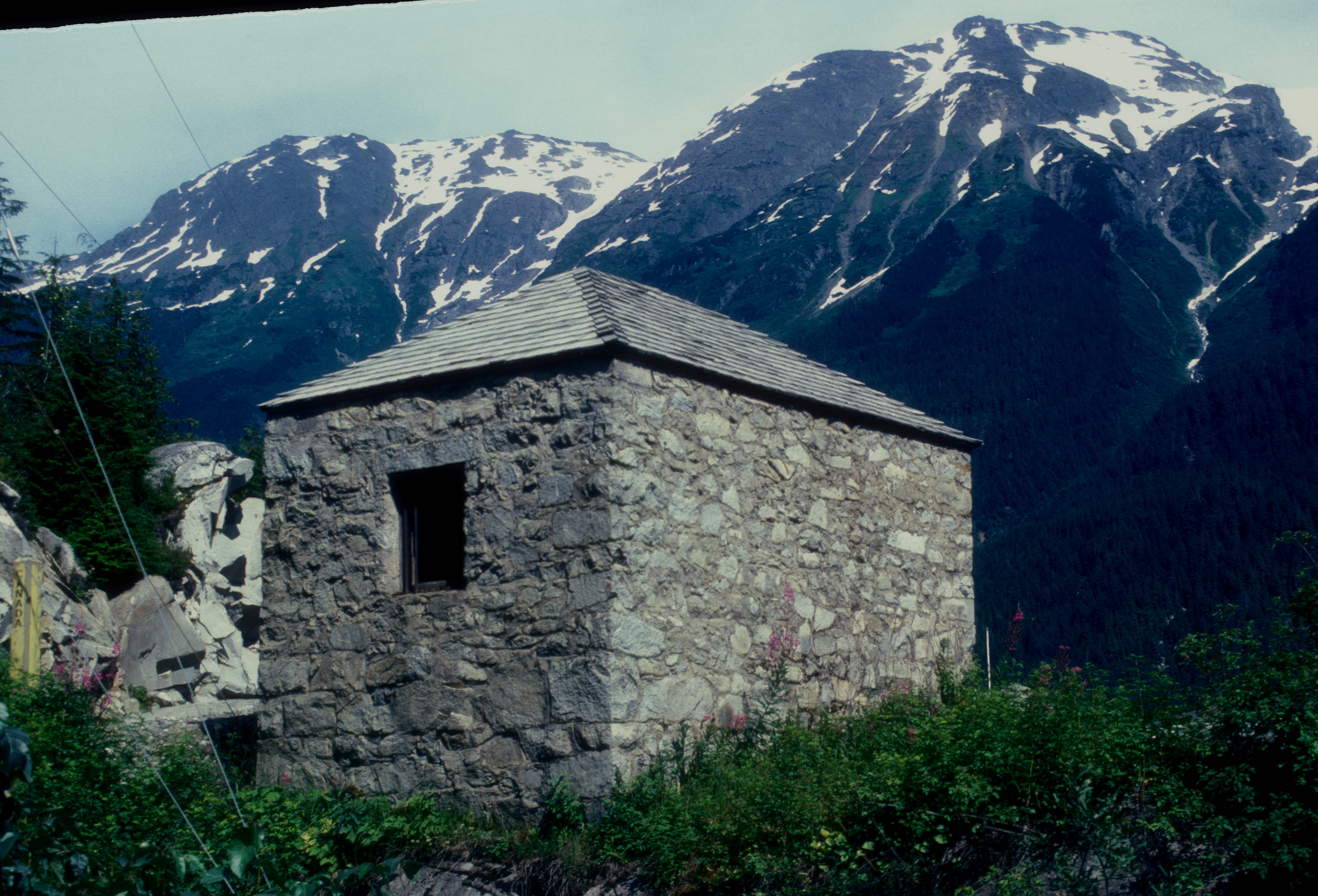
- Hyder, Storehouse No. 4, built by David du Bose Gaillard.

- Location within the U.S. state of Alaska
- Coordinates: 55°35′49″N 132°48′10″W
- Country: United States
- State: Alaska
- Established: June 1, 2008
- Named for: Prince of Wales Island and Hyder
- Largest CDP: Metlakatla

Area
  - Total: 7,683 sq mi (19,900 km^{2})
  - Land: 3,923 sq mi (10,160 km^{2})
  - Water: 3,760 sq mi (9,700 km^{2}) 48.9%

Population (2020)
  - Total: 5,753
  - Estimate (2025): 5,777 ▲
  - Density: 1.42/sq mi (0.55/km^{2})
- Time zone: UTC−9 (Alaska)
  - Summer (DST): UTC−8 (ADT)
- Congressional district: At-large

Prince of Wales–Hyder Census Area is a census area located in the U.S. state of Alaska. As of the 2020 census, the population was 5,753, up from 5,559 in 2010. It is part of the unorganized borough and therefore has no borough seat. Its largest communities are Metlakatla and Craig. It was formerly part of the Census Bureau's Prince of Wales–Outer Ketchikan Census Area, but the name was changed in 2008 after most of the Outer Ketchikan (except the parts near the community of Hyder, and Annette Island) was lost to annexation by the Ketchikan Gateway Borough.

== Geography ==
Map of the former Prince of Wales–Outer Ketchikan Census Area

According to the U.S. Census Bureau, the census area has a total area of 7,683 square miles (19,900 km^{2}), of which 3,923 square miles (10,160 km^{2}) is land and 3,760 square miles (9,700 km^{2}) (48.9%) is water. The present-day Prince of Wales–Hyder Census Area includes Prince of Wales Island, the Hyder area as an exclave, and Annette Island, which is mostly surrounded by territory of Ketchikan Gateway Borough. Before the transfer of territory, Ketchikan Gateway Borough was enclaved within (surrounded by) the census area.

=== Adjacent boroughs and census areas ===
- Petersburg Borough – north
- City and Borough of Wrangell, Alaska – northeast
- Ketchikan Gateway Borough – between Prince of Wales and Hyder
- Regional District of Kitimat-Stikine, British Columbia, Canada – east
- North Coast Regional District, British Columbia, Canada – south (water boundary only, across Dixon Entrance to Hecate Strait)
- Hoonah–Angoon Census Area, Alaska
- City and borough of Sitka, Alaska

=== National protected areas ===
- Alaska Maritime National Wildlife Refuge (part of Gulf of Alaska unit)
  - Forrester Island Wilderness
- Tongass National Forest (part)
  - Karta River Wilderness
  - Maurille Islands Wilderness
  - South Prince of Wales Wilderness
  - Warren Island Wilderness

== Politics ==
Prince of Wales Hyder is something of a bellwether in Alaska, having voted for the national winner in nine of the twelve presidential elections since 1980.

United States presidential election results for Prince of Wales-Hyder Census Area, Alaska
Year	Republican		Democratic		Third party(ies)	
Year	No.	%	No.	%	No.	%
1960	473	45.52%	566	54.48%	0	0.00%
1964	221	19.32%	923	80.68%	0	0.00%
1968	524	43.49%	604	50.12%	77	6.39%
1972	632	50.28%	562	44.71%	63	5.01%
1976	683	47.53%	660	45.93%	94	6.54%
1980	741	46.90%	599	37.91%	240	15.19%
1984	1,254	54.90%	955	41.81%	75	3.28%
1988	1,097	50.88%	942	43.69%	117	5.43%
1992	839	31.59%	909	34.22%	908	34.19%
1996	1,331	47.98%	890	32.08%	553	19.94%
2000	1,785	61.49%	778	26.80%	340	11.71%
2004	1,182	60.49%	678	34.70%	94	4.81%
2008	1,422	51.90%	1,170	42.70%	148	5.40%
2012	1,045	42.10%	1,298	52.30%	139	5.60%
2016	1,299	48.15%	950	35.21%	449	16.64%
2020	1,607	51.89%	1,381	44.59%	109	3.52%
2024	1,735	49.70%	1,588	45.49%	168	4.81%

== Demographics ==
Historical population
Census	Pop.	Note	%±
1960	1,772		—
1970	2,106		18.8%
1980	3,822		81.5%
1990	6,278		64.3%
2000	6,146		−2.1%
2010	5,559		−9.6%
2020	5,753		3.5%
2025 (est.)	5,777	▲	0.4%
U.S. Decennial Census; 1790–1960 1900–1990; 1990–2000 2010–2020

=== 2020 census ===
Prince of Wales–Hyder Census Area, Alaska – Racial and ethnic composition Note: the US Census treats Hispanic/Latino as an ethnic category. This table excludes Latinos from the racial categories and assigns them to a separate category. Hispanics/Latinos may be of any race.
Race / Ethnicity (NH = Non-Hispanic)	Pop 1980	Pop 1990	Pop 2000	Pop 2010	Pop 2020	% 1980	% 1990	% 2000	% 2010	% 2020
White alone (NH)	2,067	3,798	3,228	2,756	2,368	54.08%	60.50%	52.52%	49.58%	41.16%
Black or African American alone (NH)	11	9	9	17	21	0.29%	0.14%	0.15%	0.31%	0.37%
Native American or Alaska Native alone (NH)	1,651	2,324	2,340	2,165	2,529	43.20%	37.02%	38.07%	38.95%	43.96%
Asian alone (NH)	19	24	22	21	25	0.50%	0.38%	0.36%	0.38%	0.43%
Native Hawaiian or Pacific Islander alone (NH)	x	x	3	21	30	x	x	0.05%	0.38%	0.52%
Other race alone (NH)	43	2	14	4	16	1.13%	0.03%	0.23%	0.07%	0.28%
Mixed race or Multiracial (NH)	x	x	423	448	604	x	x	6.88%	8.06%	10.50%
Hispanic or Latino (any race)	31	121	107	127	160	0.81%	1.93%	1.74%	2.28%	2.78%
Total	3,822	6,278	6,146	5,559	5,753	100.00%	100.00%	100.00%	100.00%	100.00%

As of the 2020 census, the county had a population of 5,753. The median age was 41.3 years, 23.8% of residents were under the age of 18, and 18.3% of residents were 65 years of age or older. For every 100 females there were 120.8 males, and for every 100 females age 18 and over there were 122.3 males age 18 and over.

The racial makeup of the county was 41.8% White, 0.4% Black or African American, 44.9% American Indian and Alaska Native, 0.5% Asian, 0.5% Native Hawaiian and Pacific Islander, 0.5% from some other race, and 11.4% from two or more races. Hispanic or Latino residents of any race comprised 2.8% of the population.

0.0% of residents lived in urban areas, while 100.0% lived in rural areas.

There were 2,312 households in the county, of which 29.5% had children under the age of 18 living with them and 19.6% had a female householder with no spouse or partner present. About 30.8% of all households were made up of individuals and 11.8% had someone living alone who was 65 years of age or older.

There were 3,227 housing units, of which 28.4% were vacant. Among occupied housing units, 69.7% were owner-occupied and 30.3% were renter-occupied. The homeowner vacancy rate was 2.0% and the rental vacancy rate was 14.4%.

=== 2000 census ===
At the 2000 census there were 6,146 people, 2,262 households, and 1,535 families residing in the then-census area. The population density was 1.57 inhabitants per square mile (0.60/km^{2}). There were 3,055 housing units at an average density of 0.78 per square mile (0.30/km^{2}). The racial makeup of the census area was 53.12% White, 0.15% African American, 38.68% Native American, 0.36% Asian, 0.05% Pacific Islander, 0.50% from other races, and 7.14% from two or more races. Hispanic or Latino of any race were 1.74% of any race. Of the 2,262 households, 37.60% had children under the age of 18 living with them, 50.80% were married couples living together, 10.00% have a woman whose husband does not live with her, and 32.10% were non-families. 26.00% of households were one person, and 5.00% were one person aged 65 or older. The average household size was 2.68 and the average family size was 3.25.

In the census area the population was spread out, with 31.00% under the age of 18, 7.50% from 18 to 24, 30.10% from 25 to 44, 25.80% from 45 to 64, and 5.70% 65 or older. The median age was 35 years. For every 100 females, there were 119.80 males. For every 100 females age 18 and over, there were 125.60 males.

== Communities ==
=== Cities ===
- Coffman Cove
- Craig
- Edna Bay
- Hydaburg
- Kake
- Kasaan
- Klawock
- Port Alexander
- Thorne Bay
- Whale Pass

=== Census-designated places ===
- Hollis
- Hyder
- Metlakatla
- Naukati Bay
- Point Baker
- Port Protection

=== Unincorporated Community ===
- Waterfall

=== Indian reservation ===
- Annette Island Reserve

== See also ==
- List of airports in Alaska
