= Southeast Island School District =

School district in Alaska, United States

Address
- 1010 Sandy Beach Road Thorne Bay, Alaska, 99919; United States

District information
- Type: Public
- Grades: PreK–12
- NCES District ID: 0200700

Students and staff
- Students: 164
- Teachers: 19.21
- Staff: 33.47
- Student–teacher ratio: 8.54

Other information
- Website: www.sisd.org

Southeast Island School District (SISD) is a school district headquartered in Thorne Bay, Alaska.

== Schools ==
- Howard Valentine Coffman Cove School
- Hollis School
- Hyder School
- Barry C. Stewart Kasaan School
- Naukati School
- Port Alexander School
- Thorne Bay School
- Whale Pass School
