= Tongass National Forest =

National forest in southeast Alaska

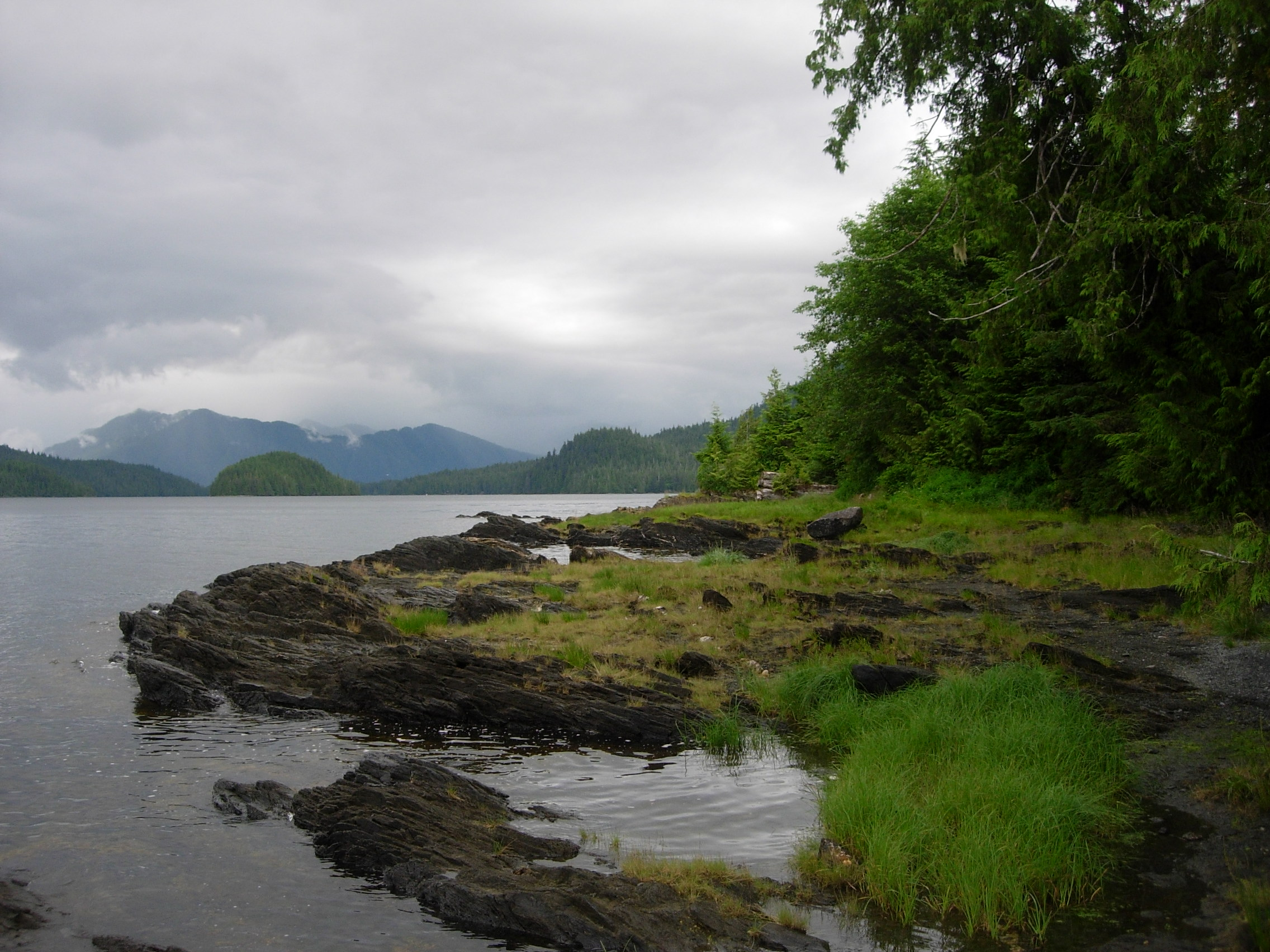
- The Tongass National Forest near Ketchikan, Alaska
- Location: Alaska Panhandle, Alaska, U.S. Interactive map of Tongass National Forest
- Coordinates: 57.329642°N 135.973898°W
- Area: 16.7 million acres (26,100 sq mi; 68,000 km^{2})
- Established: 10 September 1907
- Visitors: 1,881,000 (in 2006–2007)
- Governing body: United States Forest Service
- Website: Tongass National Forest

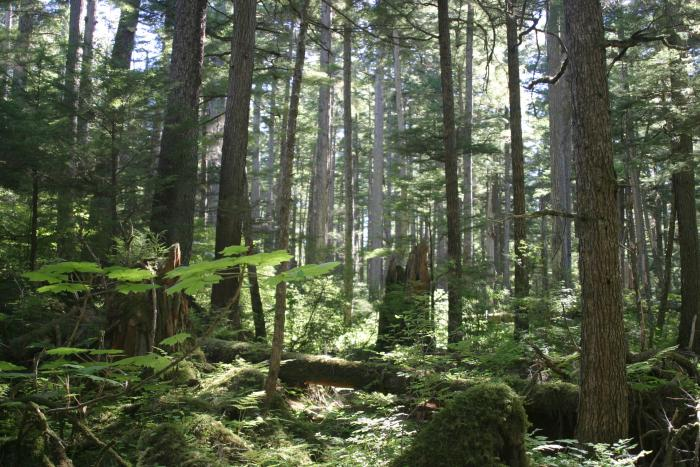
The Tongass National Forest

The Tongass National Forest (/ˈtɒŋɡəs/) in Southeast Alaska is the largest U.S. National Forest at 16.7 million acres (26,100 sq mi; 6,800,000 ha; 68,000 km^{2}), an expanse larger than 10 U.S. states and 75 U.N. member nations. Most of its area is temperate rain forest and is remote enough to be home to many species of endangered and rare flora and fauna. The Tongass, which is managed by the United States Forest Service, encompasses islands of the Alexander Archipelago, fjords and glaciers, and peaks of the Coast Mountains. An international border with Canada (British Columbia) runs along the crest of the Boundary Ranges of the Coast Mountains. The forest is administered from Forest Service headquarters offices in Ketchikan. There are local ranger district offices located in Craig, Hoonah, Juneau, Ketchikan, Petersburg, Sitka, Thorne Bay, Wrangell, and Yakutat.

== History ==
The Alexander Archipelago Forest Reserve was established by Theodore Roosevelt in a presidential proclamation of 20 August 1902. This reserve included Chichagof Island, Kupreanof Island, Kuiu Island, Zarembo Island, Prince of Wales Island, and the small adjacent islands. Another presidential proclamation made by Roosevelt, on 10 September 1907, created the Tongass National Forest. On 1 July 1908, the two forests were joined, and the combined forest area encompassed most of Southeast Alaska. Further presidential proclamations of 16 February 1909 (in the last months of the Roosevelt administration) and 10 June, and in 1925 (by Calvin Coolidge) expanded the Tongass. An early supervisor of the forest was William Alexander Langille.

On September 4, 1971, Alaska Airlines Flight 1866 crashed in the Tongass National Forest, killing all 111 people on board.

=== Aboriginal title ===
After the creation of the Tongass National Forest, the Central Council of the Tlingit and Haida Indian Tribes of Alaska formed to challenge the federal government's rights to the land in 1935.

In “The Tlingit and Haida Indians of Alaska and Harry Douglas, Intervenors v. The United States” (1968), the court found Alaskan natives held established aboriginal title by their "exclusive use and occupancy of that territory from time immemorial". The court found the Alaska Treaty of Cessation between Russia and the United States did not extinguish aboriginal title to the land, and that the creation of the Tongass National Forest constituted a taking of land from the Tlingit and Haida. The case was finally settled in 1968 with a $7.5 million payment that valued the Tongass at about 43 cents an acre. The value was based on land value at the time of the taking in 1902, without the inflation or interest accrued in the past 66 years.

=== Logging ===
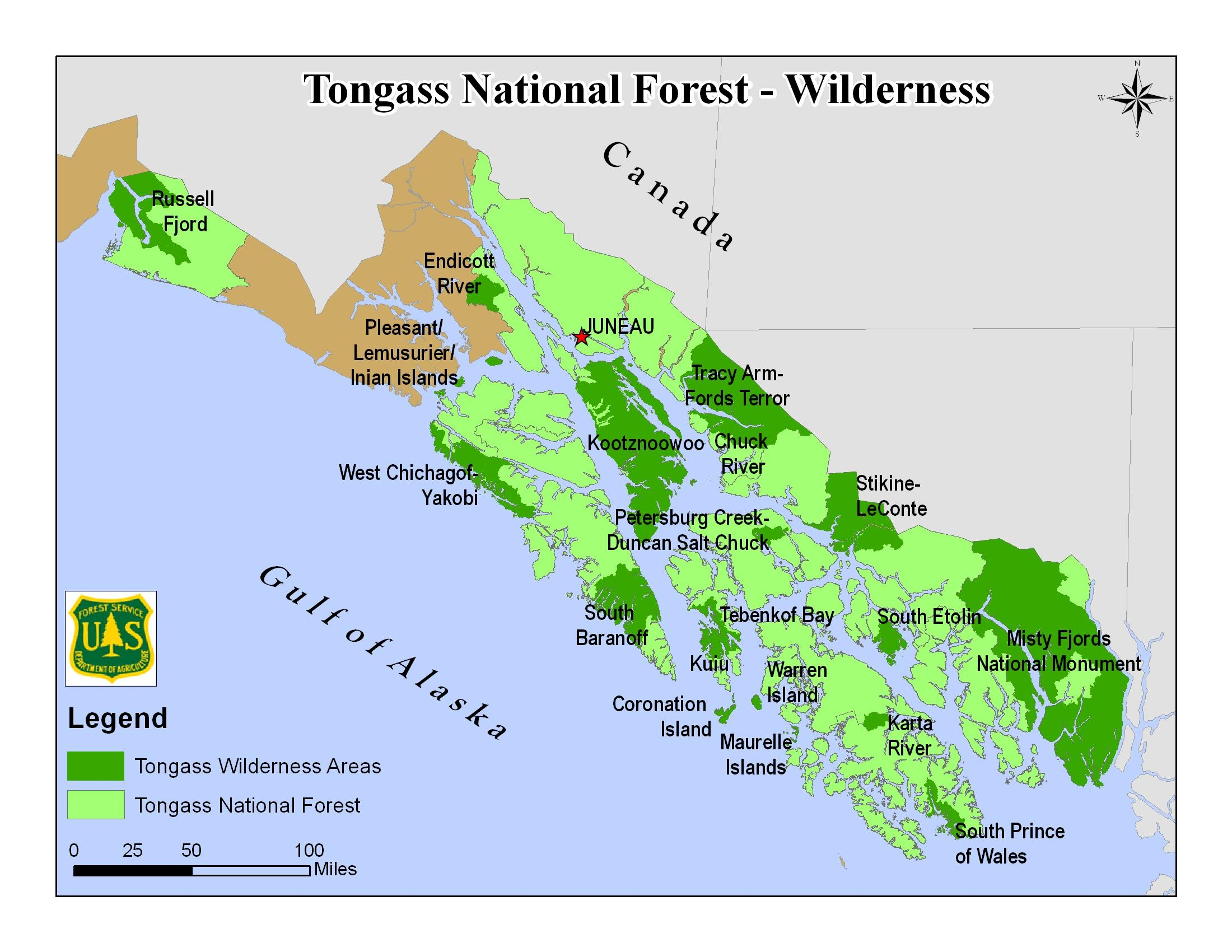
Forest Service map of the Tongass, with National Monuments and Wilderness Areas

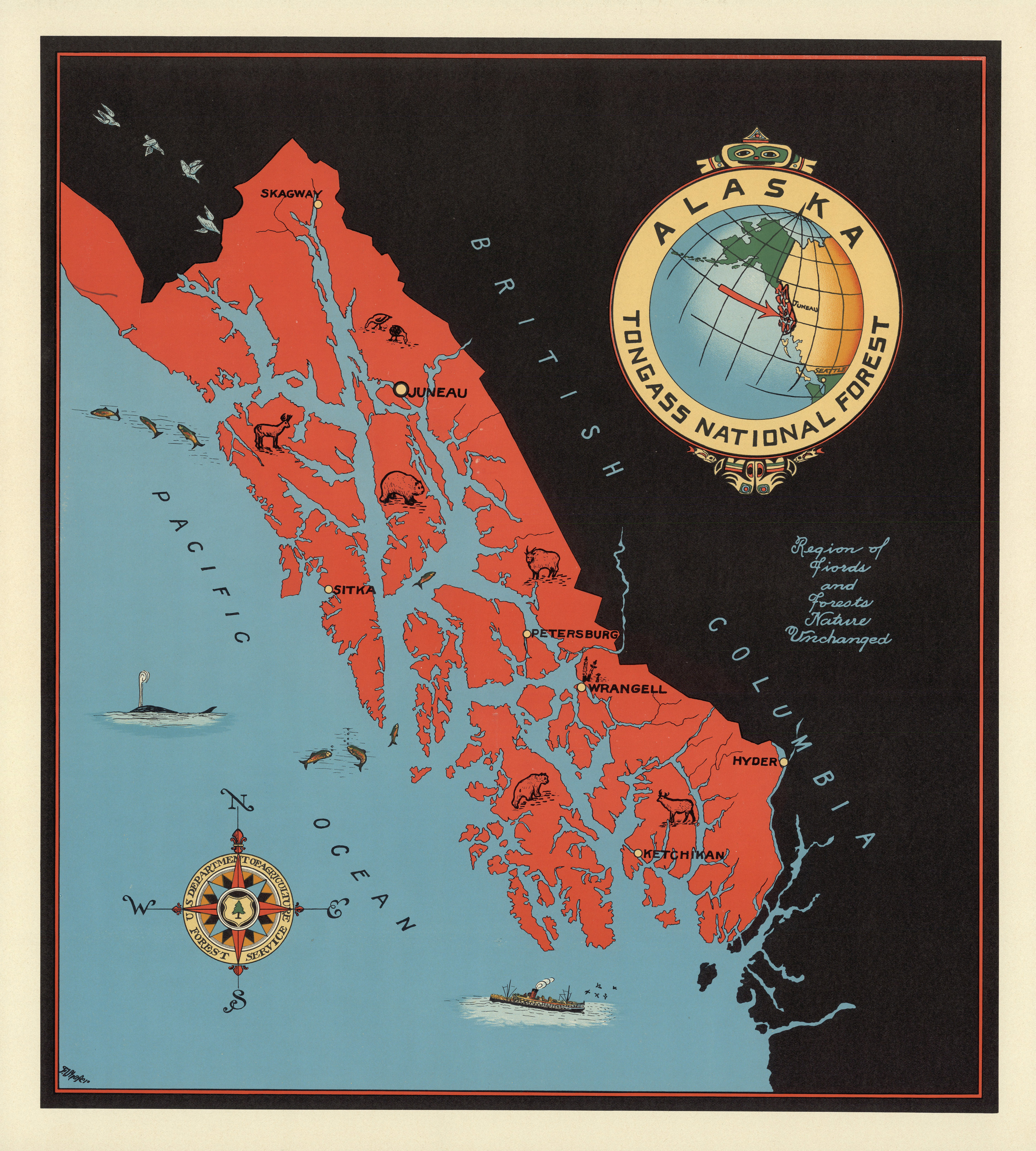
Alaska: Tongass National Forest. F.I. Shafer. 1940

Timber harvest in Southeast Alaska consisted of individual handlogging operations up until the 1950s, focusing on lowlying areas and beach fringe areas. In the 1950s, in part to aid in Japanese recovery from World War II, the Forest Service set up long-term contracts with two pulp mills: the Ketchikan Pulp Company (KPC) and the Alaska Pulp Company. These contracts were scheduled to last 50 years, and originally intended to complement independent sawlog operations in the region. However, the two companies conspired to drive log prices down, put smaller logging operations out of business, and were major and recalcitrant polluters in their local areas. Ultimately, virtually all timber sales in the Tongass were purchased by one of these two companies.

In 1974, the exclusive KPC contract for 800,000 acres of old growth forest on Prince of Wales Island was challenged by the Point Baker Association led by Alan Stein, Chuck Zieske and Herb Zieske. Federal District Court judge James von der Heydt ruled in their favor in December 1975 and March 1976, enjoining clearcutting of over 150 square miles (390 km^{2}) of the north end of Prince of Wales Island. The suit threatened to halt clearcutting in the United States. In 1976, Congress removed the Zieske injunction in passing the National Forest Management Act. Over half the old growth timber was removed there by the mid 1990s.

The battle for buffer strips, to protect salmon streams from logging, which began in the Zieske v Butz lawsuit, continued through comments submitted to the major US Forest Service Environmental Impact Statements issued in subsequent five-year intervals starting in 1979, and continuing in the 1988 EIS.

In 1990, a Federal District Court in Alaska, in a case called Stein v Barton, held the US Forest Service had to protect all salmon streams in the Tongass with buffer strips. One of the claims in Stein v Barton for protection of the Salmon Bay Watershed was partially enacted into law when Congress Passed the Tongass Timber Reform Act; environmental lobbyists had compromised with Senator Ted Stevens leaving the most valuable forest available to logging in the headwaters of the salmon streams therein.

Much of the power of these companies lay in the long-term contracts. The contracts guaranteed low prices to the pulp companies—in some cases resulting in trees being given away for "less than the price of a hamburger".

The Tongass Timber Reform Act, enacted in 1990, significantly reshaped the logging industry's relationship with the Tongass National Forest. The law's provisions cancelled a $40 million annual subsidy for timber harvest; established several new wilderness areas and closed others to logging; and required that future cutting under the 50-year pulp contracts be subject to environmental review and limitations on old-growth harvest. Alaska Pulp Corporation and Ketchikan Pulp Corporation claimed that the new restrictions made them uncompetitive and closed down their mills in 1993 and 1997, respectively, and the Forest Service then cancelled the remainders of the two 50-year timber contracts.

In 2003, an appropriations bill rider required that all timber sales in the Tongass must be positive sales, meaning no sales could be sold that undervalued the "stumpage" rate, or the value of the trees as established by the marketplace (2008 Appropriations Bill P.L. 110–161, H. Rept. 110–497, Sec. 411). However, the Forest Service also conducts NEPA analyses, layout, and administrative operations to support these sales, and as such, the government does not make a profit overall. Given the guaranteed low prices during contract days and the continued high cost of logging in Southeast Alaska today, one analysis concludes that, since 1980, the Forest Service has lost over one billion dollars in Tongass timber sales. Logging operations are not the only deficit-run programs, however. The Forest Service likens the overall deficit of the timber harvest program to the many other programs the agency operates at a deficit, including trail, cabin, and campground maintenance and subsistence programs.

High-grading (preferentially targeting for logging the most profitable forest types) has been prevalent in the Tongass throughout the era of industrial-scale logging there. For example, the forest type with the largest concentration of big trees—volume class 7—originally comprised only 4% of the forested portion of the Tongass, and over two-thirds of it has been logged. Other high-grading has concentrated on stands of Alaska cedar and red cedar. The karst terrain often produces large trees and has fewer muskeg bogs, and has also been preferentially logged.

In a move that reverses a Trump administration decision to lift restrictions on logging and road-building, the Biden administration announced on 15 July 2021 that it would end large-scale, old-growth timber sales in the Tongass National Forest. Forest restoration, recreation and other non-commercial uses will instead be the focus. The new rules would still allow for smaller timber sales, including some old-growth trees, for cultural uses by local communities.

=== Roadless controversy ===
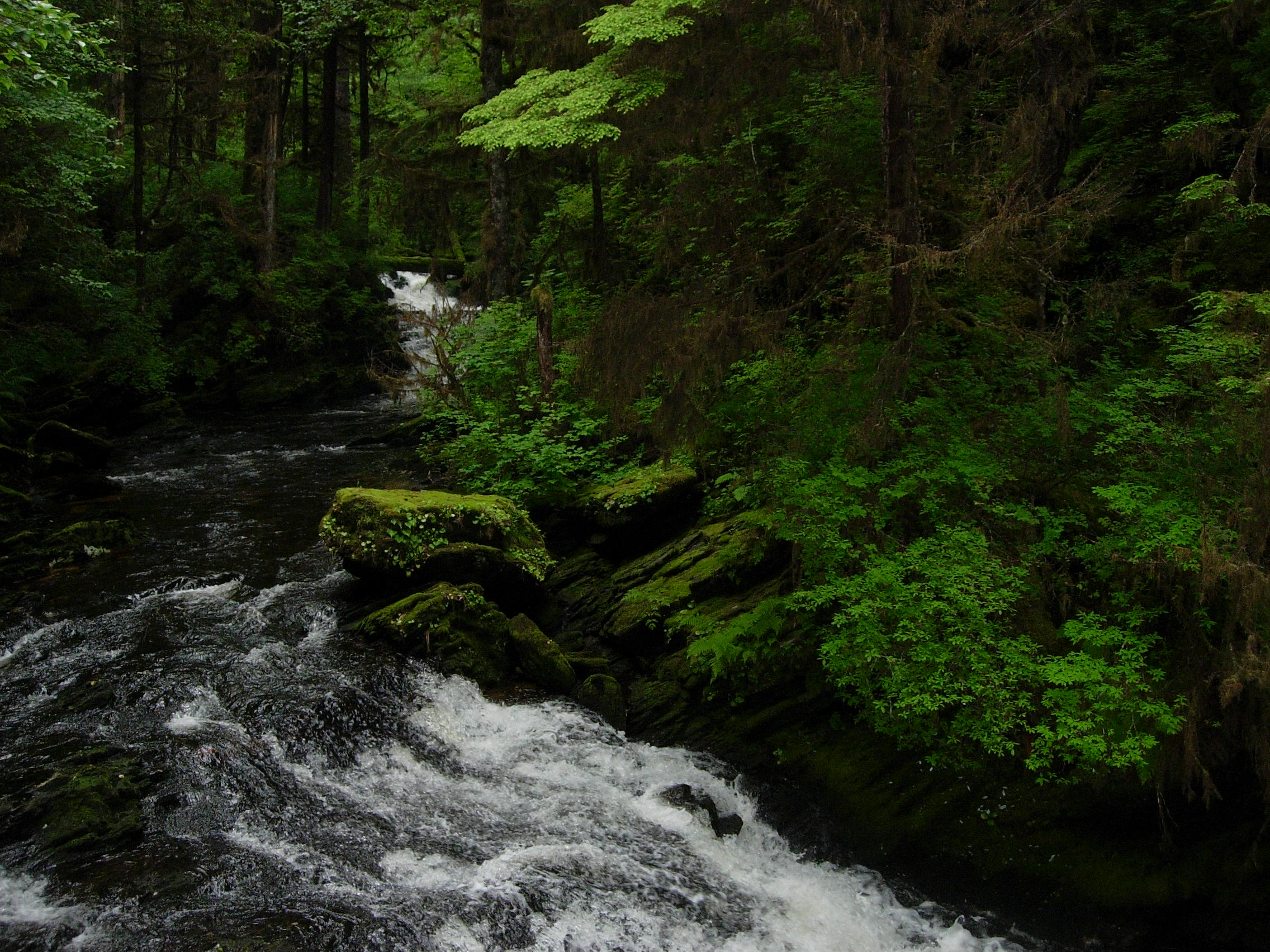
A stream in the forest

The most contested logging in the Tongass has involved the roadless areas. Southeast Alaska is an extensive landscape, with communities scattered across the archipelago on different islands, isolated from each other and the mainland road system. The road system that exists in the region is in place because of the resource extraction history in the region, primarily established by the Forest Service to enable timber harvest. Once in place, these roads serve to connect local communities and visitors to recreation, hunting, fishing, and subsistence opportunities long into the future. Installing roads in the vast wilderness areas of the Tongass has been opposed by the roadless area conservation movement, which claims that it would promote habitat fragmentation, diminish wildlife populations and damage salmon spawning streams. They argue that existing roads are sufficient.

The Tongass National Forest was included in the Roadless Initiative passed on January 5, 2001, during the last days of the Bill Clinton Administration, and the initiative prevented the construction of new roads in roadless areas of United States national forests.

In September 2006, a landmark court decision overturned Bush's repeal of the Roadless Rule, reverting to the 2001 roadless area protections established under president Clinton. The Tongass remained exempt from that ruling. In June 2007, U.S. House members added an amendment to the appropriations bill to block federally funded road building in Tongass National Forest. Proponents of the amendment said that the federal timber program in Tongass is a dead loss for taxpayers, costing some $30 million annually, and noted that the Forest Service faces an estimated $900 million road maintenance backlog in the forest. Supporters of the bipartisan amendment included the Republicans for Environmental Protection. Representative Steve Chabot, an Ohio Republican who sponsored the amendment, said, "I am not opposed to logging when it's done on the timber company's dime ... But in this case, they are using the American taxpayer to subsidize these 200 jobs at the tune of $200,000 per job. That just makes no sense."

In July 2009, the Obama Administration approved clearcut logging on 381 acres (1.54 km^{2}) in the remaining old growth forests of a Tongass National Forest roadless area. The timber sale was permanently stopped by a lawsuit.

In March 2011, Judge John Sedwick from the Anchorage federal district court, in his ruling, reinstated the Roadless Rule on roadless areas in the Tongass, but with three of the Forest Service's recent timber projects excluded from that ruling "without prejudice". Those projects were Iyouktug Timber Sales ROD (record of decision), Scratchings Timber Sale ROD II, and Kuiu Timber Sale Area ROD. The Order concluded in part:

Because the reasons proffered by the Forest Service in support of the Tongass Exemption were implausible, contrary to the evidence in the record, and contrary to Ninth Circuit precedent, the court concludes that promulgation of the Tongass Exemption was arbitrary and capricious.

With the passage of the Roadless Rule, inventoried roadless areas, 'for better or worse, [were] more committed to pristine wilderness, and less amendable to road development for purposes permitted by the Forest Service.'

While the Forest Service may reevaluate its approach to roadless area management in the Tongass, it must comply with the requirements of the APA [the federal Administrative Procedures Act] in doing so.

In October 2019, the Trump administration instructed federal officials to reverse the limits of tree cutting at the request of Alaska's top elected officials, including Senator Lisa Murkowski and Governor Michael J. Dunleavy. In a statement, Forest Service officials said the new plan would be subject to public comment for 60 days.

The Forest Service removed most of the Tongass National Forest from roadless area designation in October 2020, allowing road construction and logging in more than 9.3 million acres of rainforest. Clear-cut lands lose the carbon sink of old-growth forest, habitat for wildlife, and soil stability, causing landslides.

In June 2021, the Joe Biden administration revealed its intent to "repeal or replace" Trump's removal of roadless designation. According to Matt Herrick, spokesman for the United States Department of Agriculture (USDA) under Biden, "We [the USDA] recognize the vital role the forest and its inventoried roadless areas play in communities, and in the economy and culture of southeast Alaska, as well as for climate resilience." The Biden administration planned to formally publish its intent to revise the Trump-era rule by August 2021, with details of the plan being finalized in the following two years. In November 2021, the administration officially published a rule to restore roadless protections in the Tongass National Forest. The rule took effect in January 2023, restoring the 2001 roadless rule.

== Description ==
Known by the U.S. Forest Service as the "crown jewel", the Tongass stretches across 17 million acres of land and is Alaska's largest National Forest. Alaska Wilderness League describes the Tongass as "one of the last remaining intact temperate rainforests in the world". 70,000 people inhabit the region. While the timber industry dominated the economy for a long time, the region has transitioned into "non-timber... [sources of revenue] such as recreation, subsistence food, salmon, scientific use, and carbon sequestration [which] contributes more than $2 billion" annually. Tourism supports over 10,000 jobs in the Tongass National Forest, with about 10% being related to fishing activities.

Three Alaska Native nations live in Southeast Alaska: the Tlingit, Haida, and Tsimshian. Thirty-one communities are located within the forest; the largest is Juneau, the state capital, with a population of 31,000. The forest is named for the Tongass group of the Tlingit people, who inhabited the southernmost areas of Southeast Alaska, near what is now the city of Ketchikan.

== Ecology ==
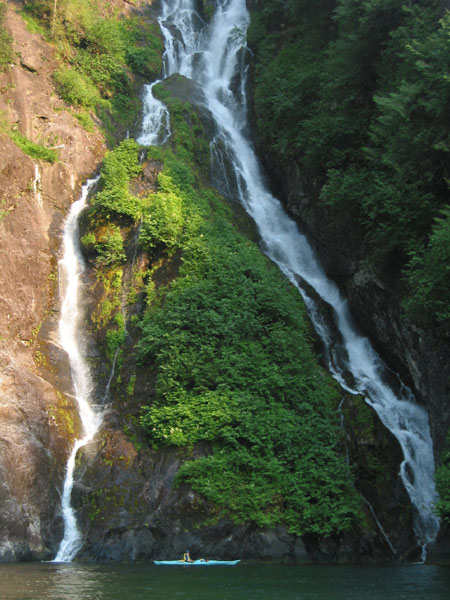
Misty Fjords Waterfall and kayak

The Tongass includes parts of the Northern Pacific coastal forests and Pacific Coastal Mountain icefields and tundra ecoregions. Along with the Central and North Coast regions of British Columbia designated as the Great Bear Rainforest, the Tongass is part of the "perhumid rainforest zone", and the forest is primarily made up of western red cedar, sitka spruce, and western hemlock. The Tongass is Earth's largest remaining temperate rainforest. The terrain underlying the forest is divided between karst (limestone rock, well-drained soil, and many caves) and granite (poorly drained soil).

Unique and protected creatures seldom found anywhere else in North America inhabit the thousands of islands along the Alaska coast. Five species of salmon, brown and black bears, and bald eagles abound throughout the forest. Other terrestrial animals include wolves, mountain goats, ravens, and sitka black-tailed deer. Many migratory birds spend summer months nesting among the archipelago, notably the Arctic tern. Orca and humpback whales, sea lions, seals, sea otters, river otters, and porpoises swim offshore. The Tongass is also home to steelhead and salmon. The Tongass is also the only place in the United States where the Haida ermine, a rare and endangered species of weasel, can be found; aside from here, the only other place on Earth where it is found is the Haida Gwaii archipelago in Canada. Of the three subspecies of the Haida ermine, one is found on Prince of Wales Island and the other is found on Suemez Island (both located within the Tongass), with the third being found on Haida Gwaii.

Though its land area is huge, about 40% of the Tongass is composed of wetlands, snow, ice, rock, and non-forest vegetation, while the remaining 10 million acres (40,000 km^{2}) are forested. About 5 million acres (20,000 km^{2}) are considered "productive old-growth", and 4,500,000 acres (18,000 km^{2}) of those are preserved as wilderness areas.

Historically, logging operations tended to concentrate on lower-elevation, bigger-tree ecosystems for harvesting; at present, approximately 78% of the land remains intact, i.e. 383,000 acres (1,550 km^{2}) out of 491,000 acres (1,990 km^{2}) original big-tree, low-elevation forest area. Given the high value of these areas for wildlife species, close to 70% of this old growth forest is protected in reserves and will never be eligible for harvest.

Major disturbances in the Tongass National Forest include windfall and landslides. Local winter windstorms referred to as the "Takus" can affect the structure of some stands and often cause single-tree blow-downs.

Of all the old growth in the forest, no more than 11% of the remaining area will ever be harvested. Of the 5,700,000 acres (23,000 km^{2}) of "productive old-growth" in the forest, 676,000 acres (2,740 km^{2}), or 12% of the total old-growth, are slated for harvest over the next 10 years. Current harvesting plans call for a phase-out of old-growth harvesting, to be replaced by rotation harvesting of managed second-growth forests.

The World Wildlife Fund locates it in their Pacific temperate rain forest 'WWF ecoregion', a geographical area.

=== Wilderness areas ===
There are 19 designated wilderness areas within the Tongass National Forest, more than in any other national forest. They contain over 5,750,000 acres (23,300 km^{2}) of territory, also more than any other. From largest to smallest, they are:

- Misty Fjords National Monument Wilderness
- Kootznoowoo Wilderness
- Tracy Arm-Fords Terror Wilderness
- Stikine-LeConte Wilderness
- Russell Fjord Wilderness
- South Baranof Wilderness
- West Chichagof-Yakobi Wilderness
- Endicott River Wilderness
- South Prince of Wales Wilderness
- South Etolin Wilderness
- Chuck River Wilderness
- Tebenkof Bay Wilderness
- Kuiu Wilderness
- Petersburg Creek-Duncan Salt Chuck Wilderness
- Karta River Wilderness
- Pleasant/Lemesurier/Inian Islands Wilderness
- Coronation Island Wilderness
- Warren Island Wilderness
- Maurille Islands Wilderness

There are three other wilderness areas within the Alaska Panhandle region that are not part of the Tongass National Forest, but are administered by the United States Fish and Wildlife Service as part of the Alaska Maritime National Wildlife Refuge. From largest to smallest they are the Forrester Island Wilderness, the Saint Lazaria Wilderness, and the Hazy Islands Wilderness. Also in Southeast Alaska, but not in the Tongass National Forest, are the Glacier Bay Wilderness and a small part of the Wrangell-Saint Elias Wilderness, which are both administered by the National Park Service.

== Recreation ==
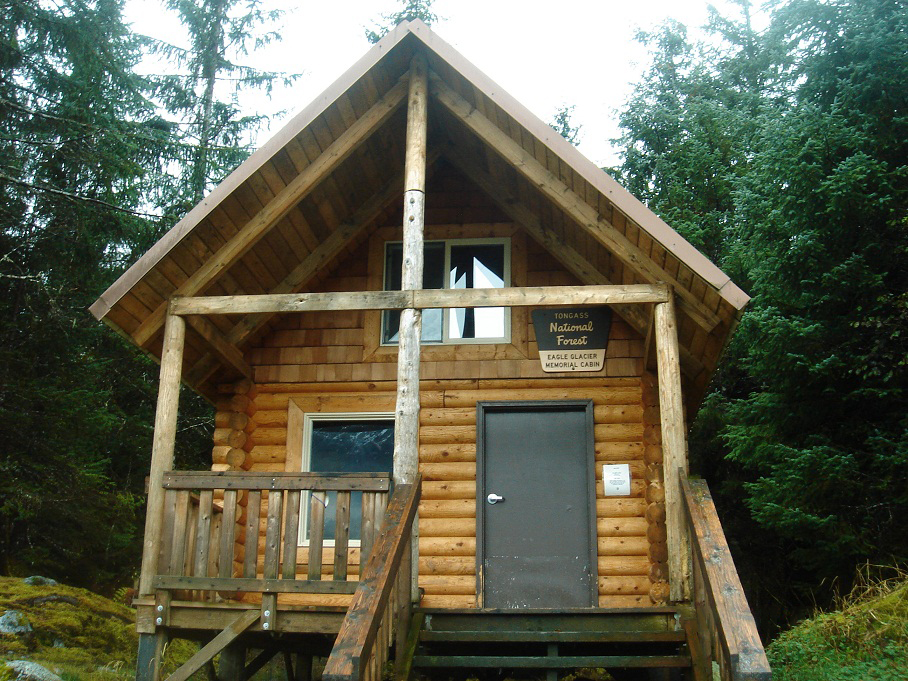
Eagle Glacier Memorial Cabin, located near Juneau in the Tongass National Forest

The Tongass National Forest offers recreation opportunities, some of which are found only in Alaska. The forest has close to one million visitors each year. Most come by cruise ships arriving through the Inside Passage of Southeast Alaska. The Forest Service provides visitor programs at the Mendenhall Glacier Visitor Center in Juneau and the Southeast Alaska Discovery Center in Ketchikan. The Mendenhall Glacier Visitor Center, built in 1962, was the first Forest Service visitor center in the nation. The forest interpretive program on the state ferries began in the summer of 1968, and was the longest-running naturalist program in the agency until ending in 2013.

== Native inholdings ==
Native corporation lands are those designated by the Alaska Native Claims Settlement Act of 1971 (ANCSA). This Act conveyed approximately 44,000,000 acres (180,000 km^{2}) of federal land in Alaska to private native corporations which were created under the ANCSA. 632,000 acres (2,560 km^{2}) of those lands were hand-picked old growth areas of the Tongass National Forest and are still surrounded by public National Forest land. These lands are now privately held and under the management of Sealaska Corporation, one of the native regional corporations created under the ANCSA.

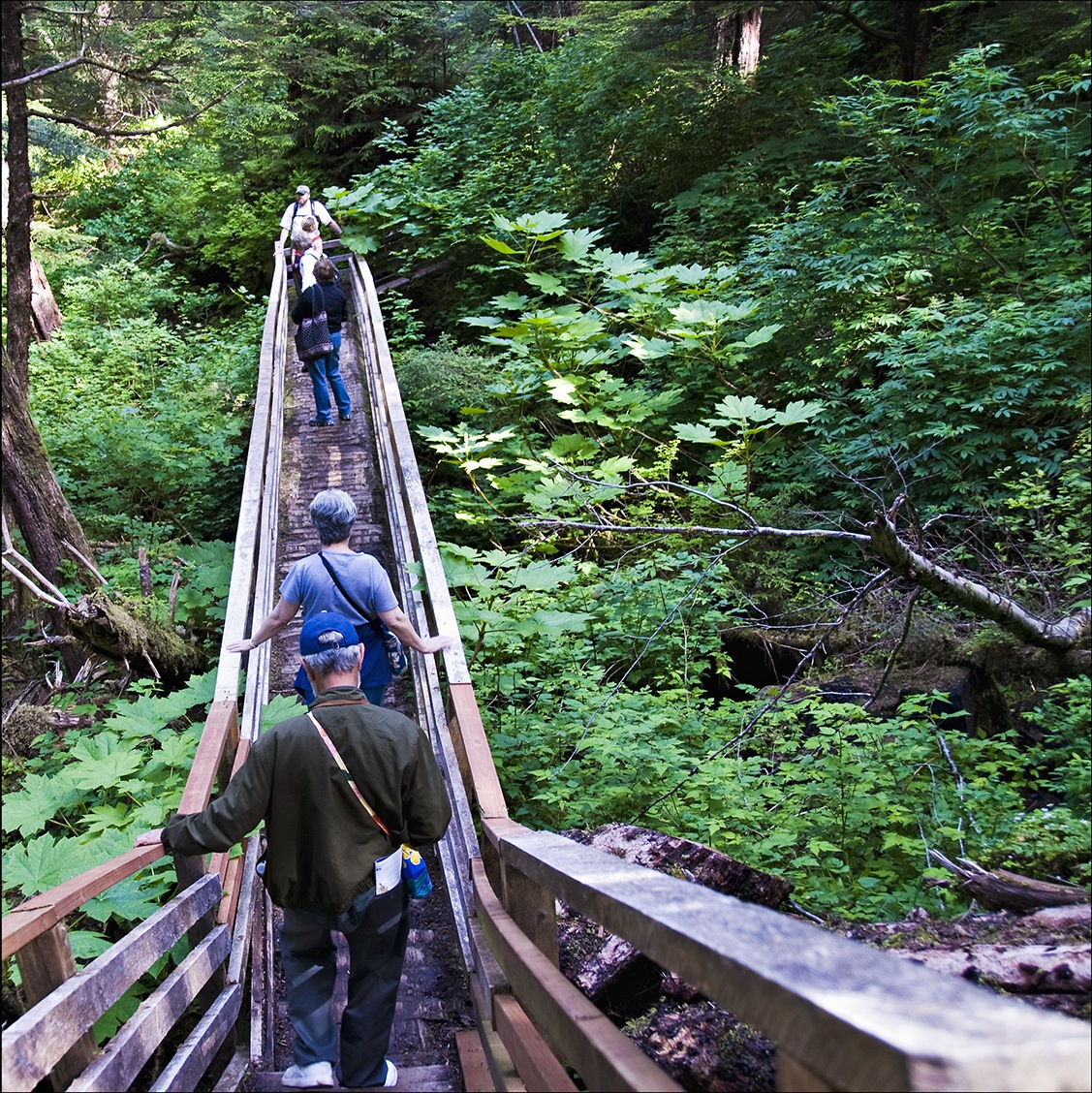
A forest path in the Tongass National Forest

Transference of public National Forest land to a privately owned corporation removes it from protection by Federal law and allows the owners to use the land in whatever way they see fit without regard to the effects of the use on surrounding lands and ecosystems. This fact has caused much controversy involving the business interests of Native Regional Corporations and the personal interests of local Native and non-Native residents of Southeastern Alaska.

Currently Sealaska, a native regional corporation created under the ANCSA is asking for an amendment to the Act that would distribute additional land to Alaskan Natives. When Sealaska was created, it was promised additional land that was unavailable at the time due to contracts with pulp mills; much of this original land is now under water or in a watershed, and consequently Sealaska has requested different land. On 23 April 2009, Senator Murkowski and U.S. Rep. Don Young introduced a revised Sealaska bill (S. 881 and H.R 2099) that requests public lands that are both economically valuable and environmentally delicate. Starting with the next session of Congress in 2011, Senator Murkowski reintroduced a slightly modified version of the Sealaska Bill and Representative Don Young introduced a companion bill (S 730 and HR 1408). While HR 1408 was passed out of the Natural Resources Committee, S 730 remains in the Natural Resources Committee of the Senate.

Known as the Sealaska Lands Bill, the removal of 91,000 acres from the regulatory protections of the USFS and transfer of the land to Sealaska, a for-profit corporation, created a huge controversy in South East Alaska.

A study released by Audubon Alaska on 22 February 2012 showed that the Sealaska selection of the largest trees in areas designated in S 730 and HR 1408 is 1200 percent greater than the occurrence of these trees in the Tongass as a whole.

There is strong opposition to passage of S 881 coming from seven communities in the Tongass, most on Prince of Wales Island. In addition, there are fears expressed by the Territorial Sportsmen that the northern goshawk will be listed as endangered if the bill is passed. Similar concerns were expressed by the Alaska Outdoor Council in letters to Senators Murkowski and Begich and Governor Parnell.

== See also ==
- List of national forests of the United States
- Chugach National Forest
- Climate change in Alaska and climate change in the Arctic
- Coeur Alaska, Inc. v. Southeast Alaska Conservation Council
- Fort Tongass
- Juneau Raptor Center
- Southeast Alaska Conservation Council
- Tongass Island
- Tongass Passage

== General references ==
- Rakestraw, Lawrence (1981). A History of the United States Forest Service in Alaska. Copyright Lawrence Rakestraw. Printed by the USDA Forest Service in 1982, 1994, 2002. SD565R24, LCCN 82-620020.
- Durbin, Kathie (1999). Tongass: Pulp Politics and the Fight for the Alaska Rain Forest. Corvallis, Oregon: Oregon State University Press. ISBN 0-87071-466-X.
- Ketchum, Robert Glenn (1987). The Tongass: Alaska's Vanishing Rain Forest: The Photographs of Robert Glenn Ketchum. Text by Robert Glenn Ketchum and Carey D. Ketchum; introduction by Roderick Nash. New York, New York: Aperture Foundation. Distributed in the U.S. by Farrar, Straus, and Giroux.
- List, Peter C., ed. (2000). Environmental Ethics and Forestry: A Reader. Environmental Ethics, Values, and Policy series. Philadelphia, Pennsylvania: Temple University Press. ISBN 1-56639-784-7. ISBN 1-56639-785-5.
- Gulick, Amy (2009). Salmon in the Trees: Life in Alaska's Tongass Rain Forest. Written by Amy Gulick, Illustrated by Ray Troll. Published by Mountaineers Books. ISBN 978-1-59485-091-2
