= Amy Gulick =

American photographer

Amy Gulick is an American nature and wildlife photographer. She is one of the founding Fellows of the International League of Conservation Photographers

Her award-winning images have been featured in many magazines, including publications of the National Audubon Society, National Wildlife Federation, National Parks Conservation Association and the Sierra Club, as well as Nature's Best Photography magazine.

In 2001 she published an Internet journal about her three-week photography expedition to the Arctic National Wildlife Refuge. This effort won a Lowell Thomas Travel Journalism Award presented by the Society of American Travel Writers Foundation in 2002.

She has also received the Daniel Houseberg Wilderness Image Award from the Alaska Conservation Foundation and was awarded a Phillip Hyde grant from the North American Nature Photography Association.

In 2010 she published Salmon in the Trees: Life in Alaska's Tongass Rainforest ( ISBN 978-1-59485-091-2), a book containing her photographs, along with stories from people who live in the area. The book has been called "a great achievement in environmental photography and ecology."

== See also ==
- Nature photography
- Conservation photography
