= Port Protection Seaplane Base =

Airport in Alaska, United States

- IATA: PPV; ICAO: none; FAA LID: 19P

Summary
- Airport type: Public
- Owner: State of Alaska DOT&PF - Southeast Region
- Serves: Port Protection, Alaska
- Elevation AMSL: 0 ft / 0 m
- Coordinates: 56°19′44″N 133°36′36″W

Map
- Location of airport in Alaska

Runways
Direction	Length		Surface
Direction	ft	m	Surface
NW/SE	4,000	1,219	Water

Statistics (2006)
- Aircraft operations: 330
- Source: Federal Aviation Administration

Port Protection Seaplane Base (IATA: PPV, FAA LID: 19P) is a state owned, public use seaplane base located in Port Protection, a community in the Prince of Wales-Hyder Census Area of the U.S. state of Alaska. It is included in the National Plan of Integrated Airport Systems for 2011–2015, which categorized it as a general aviation facility.

== Facilities and aircraft ==
Port Protection Seaplane Base has one seaplane landing area designated NW/SE with a water surface measuring 4,000 by 1,000 feet (1,219 x 305 m). For the 12-month period ending December 31, 2006, the airport had 330 aircraft operations, an average of 27 per month: 91% air taxi and 9% general aviation.

== Airlines and destinations ==
Airlines	Destinations
Taquan Air	Ketchikan Harbor

== See also ==
- List of airports in Alaska
- Port Protection, Alaska
