= Port Protection, Alaska =

Port Protection, Alaska Kél
- CDP
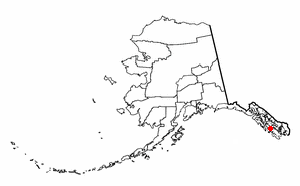
- Location of Port Protection, Alaska

- Location within Alaska Location within North America
- Coordinates: 56°19′19″N 133°36′24″W
- Country: United States
- State: Alaska
- Census area: Prince of Wales-Hyder

Government
  - State senator: Bert Stedman (R)
  - State rep.: Rebecca Himschoot (I)

Area
  - Total: 3.91 sq mi (10.12 km^{2})
  - Land: 3.71 sq mi (9.61 km^{2})
  - Water: 0.20 sq mi (0.52 km^{2})
- Elevation: 226 ft (69 m)

Population (2020)
  - Total: 36
  - Density: 9.7/sq mi (3.75/km^{2})
- Time zone: UTC-9 (Alaska (AKST))
  - Summer (DST): UTC-8 (AKDT)
- ZIP code: 99927
- Area code: 907
- FIPS code: 02-63870
- GNIS feature ID: 1866970

Port Protection (Lingít: Kél) is a census-designated place (CDP) in Prince of Wales-Hyder Census Area, Alaska, United States. The population was 36 at the 2020 census, down from 48 in 2010 census.

== Geography ==
Port Protection is located at 56°19′19″N 133°36′24″W (56.322078, -133.606706).

According to the United States Census Bureau, the CDP has a total area of 3.91 square miles (10.1 km^{2}), of which, 3.71 square miles (9.6 km^{2}) of it is land and 0.20 square miles (0.52 km^{2}) of it (2.61%) is water.

== History ==
In 1975, Port Protection and Point Baker made national news when Zieske v Butz, a landmark lawsuit against the US Forest Service brought by Point Baker residents Charles Zieske, Alan Stein and Herb Zieske, was decided by Judge James von der Heydt, the Alaska Federal District court judge. The lawsuit was initiated by Alan Stein and the Point Baker Association which had about 30 fishermen members from the communities of Pt Baker and Port Protection. On December 24, 1975, von der Hedyt issued an injunction against all clearcutting on the North end of the Prince of Wales island from Red Bay to Calder Bay. The lawsuit stopped planned clear cutting on 400,000 acres (1,600 km2) on the north end Island. Congress lifted the injunction when it passed the National Forest Management Act in 1976.

Twice more Port Protection and Pt Baker made headlines In 1989, in a landmark lawsuit called Stein v Barton, many of its residents fought for buffer strips on all the salmon streams of the Tongass and for protection of the Salmon Bay watershed. In the 1990 Tongass Timber Reform Act, lobbyists for an environmental group in Washington compromised with Senator Ted Stevens and only got part of the Salmon Bay watershed protected. The timber surrounding an important salmon stream was bargained away. This statute also protected all the salmon streams in the Tongass with 100-foot-wide (30 m) buffer strips during logging operations.

Residents of the area are featured in the National Geographic Channel reality documentary series Life Below Zero: Port Protection, Port Protection, Alaska and its spinoff Lawless Island.

== Demographics ==
Historical population
Census	Pop.	Note	%±
1990	62		—
2000	63		1.6%
2010	48		−23.8%
2020	36		−25.0%
U.S. Decennial Census

Port Protection first appeared on the 1990 U.S. Census as a census-designated place (CDP).

At the 2000 census there were 63 people, 31 households, and 12 families in the CDP. The population density was 14.1 inhabitants per square mile (5.4/km^{2}). There were 52 housing units at an average density of 11.6 per square mile (4.5/km^{2}). The racial makeup of the CDP was 87.30% White, 1.59% Asian, and 11.11% from two or more races. Hispanic or Latino of any race were 4.76%.

Of the 31 households, 22.6% had children under the age of 18 living with them, 32.3% were married couples living together, 12.9% had a female householder with no husband present, and 51.6% were non-families. 48.4% of households were one person, and 12.9% were one person aged 65 or older. One household housed the mayor Bill McNeff. The average household size was 2.03 and the average family size was 2.80.

In the CDP the population was spread out, with 23.8% under the age of 18, 6.3% from 18 to 24, 31.7% from 25 to 44, 28.6% from 45 to 64, and 9.5% 65 or older. The median age was 42 years. For every 100 females, there were 152.0 males. For every 100 females age 18 and over, there were 152.6 males.

The median household income was $10,938 and the median family income was $41,250. Males had a median income of $0 versus 51,250 for females. The per capita income for the CDP was $12,058. About 44.4% of families and 57.5% of the population were living below the poverty line, including 73.3% of under eighteens and 60.0% of those over 64.

== See also ==
- Port Protection Seaplane Base
