= Waterfall, Alaska =

Unincorporated community in the state of Alaska, United States

- Unincorporated community
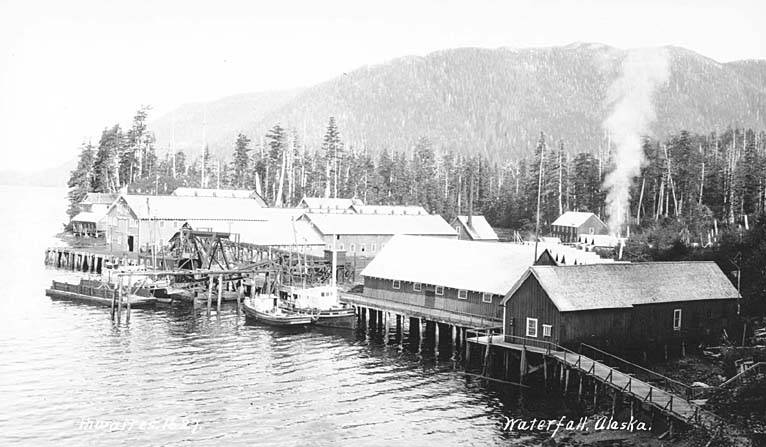
- Waterfall in 1910

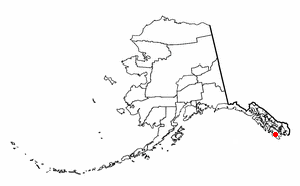
- Location of Waterfall, Alaska
- Coordinates: 55°17′50″N 133°14′26″W
- Country: United States
- State: Alaska
- Borough: Unorganized
- Census area: Prince of Wales-Hyder
- Township: T S R E Copper River Meridian

Government
  - State senator: Bert Stedman (R)
  - State rep.: Dan Ortiz (I)
- Time zone: UTC-9 (Alaska (AKST))
  - Summer (DST): UTC-8 (AKDT)
- Area code: 907
- FIPS code: 02-

Waterfall is an unincorporated community on the west coast of Prince of Wales Island in Prince of Wales-Hyder Census Area, Alaska, United States, approximately 60 miles (97 km) west of Ketchikan. The primary industry was Waterfall Cannery, built in 1912 as a salmon processing facility. The cannery closed in 1973 and was renovated into the Waterfall Resort, a sport fishing lodge.

Waterfall is not connected to the island's road system; visitors to the resort arrive by floatplane from Ketchikan.
