= Whale Pass, Alaska =

- Second Class City
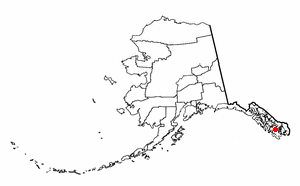
- Location of Whale Pass, Alaska
- Coordinates: 56°6′45″N 133°8′31″W
- Country: United States
- State: Alaska
- Incorporated: 2017

Government
  - State senator: Bert Stedman (R)
  - State rep.: Dan Ortiz (I)

Area
  - Total: 28.01 sq mi (72.54 km^{2})
  - Land: 19.86 sq mi (51.43 km^{2})
  - Water: 8.15 sq mi (21.11 km^{2})
- Elevation: 128 ft (39 m)

Population (2020)
  - Total: 86
  - Density: 4.3/sq mi (1.67/km^{2})
- Time zone: UTC-9 (Alaska (AKST))
  - Summer (DST): UTC-8 (AKDT)
- ZIP Code: 99927, 99950
- Area code: 907
- FIPS code: 02-84000
- GNIS feature ID: 1744590

Whale Pass is a second-class city in Prince of Wales-Hyder Census Area, Alaska, United States. As of the 2020 census, Whale Pass had a population of 86.

== Geography ==
Whale Pass is located at 56°6′45″N 133°8′31″W (56.112370, -133.141892).

According to the United States Census Bureau, the CDP has a total area of 37.4 square miles (97 km^{2}), of which, 35.6 square miles (92 km^{2})is land and 1.8 square miles (4.7 km^{2})(4.68%) is water.

== Demographics ==
Historical population
Census	Pop.	Note	%±
1980	90		—
1990	75		−16.7%
2000	58		−22.7%
2010	31		−46.6%
2020	86		177.4%
U.S. Decennial Census

Whale Pass first appeared on the 1980 U.S. Census as the census-designated place (CDP) of "North Whale Pass." The name was shortened to Whale Pass effective as of the 1990 census. On January 31, 2017, residents voted to incorporate Whale Pass as a second-class city.

=== 2020 census ===
As of the 2020 census, Whale Pass had a population of 86. The median age was 56.3 years. 23.3% of residents were under the age of 18 and 32.6% of residents were 65 years of age or older. For every 100 females there were 152.9 males, and for every 100 females age 18 and over there were 144.4 males age 18 and over.

0.0% of residents lived in urban areas, while 100.0% lived in rural areas.

There were 47 households in Whale Pass, of which 23.4% had children under the age of 18 living in them. Of all households, 29.8% were married-couple households, 40.4% were households with a male householder and no spouse or partner present, and 19.1% were households with a female householder and no spouse or partner present. About 44.7% of all households were made up of individuals and 25.6% had someone living alone who was 65 years of age or older.

There were 87 housing units, of which 46.0% were vacant. The homeowner vacancy rate was 4.9% and the rental vacancy rate was 46.7%.

Racial composition as of the 2020 census
Race	Number	Percent
White	78	90.7%
Black or African American	1	1.2%
American Indian and Alaska Native	1	1.2%
Asian	0	0.0%
Native Hawaiian and Other Pacific Islander	0	0.0%
Some other race	0	0.0%
Two or more races	6	7.0%
Hispanic or Latino (of any race)	2	2.3%

=== 2000 census ===
As of the census of 2000, there were 58 people, 22 households, and 13 families residing in the CDP. The population density was 1.6 inhabitants per square mile (0.62/km^{2}). There were 51 housing units at an average density of 1.4 per square mile (0.54/km^{2}). The racial makeup of the CDP was 96.55% White, 1.72% Native American, and 1.72% from two or more races. Hispanic or Latino people of any race were 6.90% of the population.

There were 22 households, out of which 36.4% had children under the age of 18 living with them, 45.5% were married couples living together, 9.1% had a female householder with no husband present, and 40.9% were non-families. 22.7% of all households were made up of individuals, and 4.5% had someone living alone who was 65 years of age or older. The average household size was 2.64 and the average family size was 2.92.

In the CDP the population was spread out, with 25.9% under the age of 18, 3.4% from 18 to 24, 32.8% from 25 to 44, 34.5% from 45 to 64, and 3.4% who were 65 years of age or older. The median age was 37 years. For every 100 females, there were 114.8 males. For every 100 females age 18 and over, there were 126.3 males.

The median income for a household in the CDP was $62,083, and the median income for a family was $72,500. The per capita income for the CDP was $24,040. None of the population and none of the families were below the poverty line.

== History ==
Whale Pass was originally a logging camp and was first recognized in 1980 as North Whale Pass, before shortening the name to simply Whale Pass. From 1980 to 2017, it was an unincorporated census-designated place (CDP). On January 31, 2017, residents voted to incorporate as a second-class city, receiving just under 75% of 46 ballots cast. This made Whale Pass the state's 116th second-class city.

== Education ==
The school is the Whale Pass School, operated by Southeast Island School District.
