= Kasaan, Alaska =

City in Alaska, U.S.

Kasaan Gasaʼáan / Kasaʼaan
- City
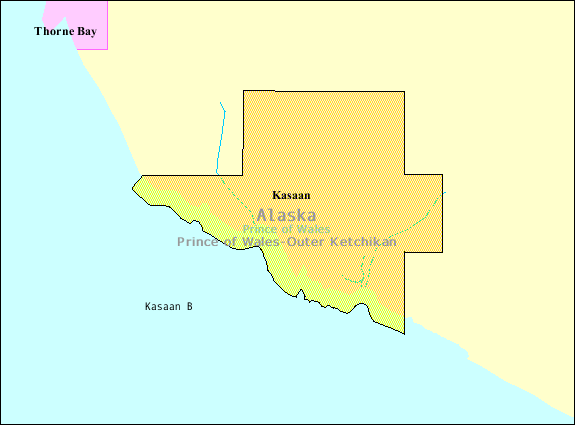
- Detailed map of Kasaan

- Location in Alaska
- Coordinates: 55°32′30″N 132°24′07″W
- Country: United States
- State: Alaska
- Incorporated: 1976

Government
  - Mayor: Robert Baker
  - State senator: Bert Stedman (R)
  - State rep.: Rebecca Himschoot (I)

Area
  - Total: 6.80 sq mi (17.61 km^{2})
  - Land: 6.06 sq mi (15.70 km^{2})
  - Water: 0.73 sq mi (1.90 km^{2})
- Elevation: 13 ft (4 m)

Population (2020)
  - Total: 30
  - Density: 4.9/sq mi (1.91/km^{2})
- Time zone: UTC-9 (Alaska (AKST))
  - Summer (DST): UTC-8 (AKDT)
- ZIP code: 99950
- Area code: 907
- FIPS code: 02-37650
- GNIS feature ID: 1404468

Kasaan /kəˈsæn/ (Haida: Gasaʼáan; Tlingit: Kasaʼaan) is a city in the Prince of Wales-Hyder Census Area in the U.S. state of Alaska. As of the 2020 census, Kasaan had a population of 30. The name "Kasaan" comes from Tlingit Kasaʼaan, meaning "pretty town".

Kasaan is the headquarters of the Organized Village of Kasaan, a federally recognized Alaska Native tribe of Haida people.

== History ==
Kasaan is one of the main historical communities of the Kaigani Haida. It is the northernmost Haida settlement. It was established by the Haida in protohistoric times or earlier, as part of a migration across the Dixon Entrance, from Dadens and other villages of Langara Island, Haida Gwaii, to Dall Island and Prince of Wales Island.

Beginning in the late 18th century, European and American ships began regularly visiting and trading with Kasaan and the rest of the Haida. Most early visiting ships were part of the maritime fur trade. The nearby trading site, "Kaigani", was one of the most popular on the Pacific Northwest coast. This trade brought wealth, but also disease; the first smallpox epidemic hit Kasaan in 1794. A rough census was taken of Kasaan between 1836 and 1841 by John Work of the Hudson's Bay Company. He reported 249 people living in the village. The 1862 Pacific Northwest smallpox epidemic killed over 70% of all Haida people. The first official census was taken in 1880, and lists only 173 at Kasaan. In the 1880s and 1890s, Alaska Steamship Company boats regularly visited a nearby fish saltery and packing business, and sometimes Kasaan. Tourists visiting Kasaan helped spark trade in Haida artifacts and new artwork.

Residents moved from their former village on Skowl Arm (now called Old Kasaan), starting in 1893, and mostly in the period 1902–1904. In 1901, the leaders of Kasaan were persuaded by the Kasaan Bay Mining Company to relocate the entire village to a new site closer to the copper mine. This migration was prompted by the promise of jobs and a school occasioned by development of copper mining and a cannery near the present location. Kasaan was established as a city in 1976.

Old Kasaan was completely abandoned by 1904, and the remains were partly destroyed by fire in 1915. The site was declared a national monument in 1916, though Old Kasaan National Monument was largely neglected and a planned restoration was not done. In 1938 five historic and three replica totem poles were moved to New Kasaan. In 1955, the site was removed from the National Park System. It became Forest Service jurisdiction, which established a 38-acre Old Kasaan Village Historical Area in 1957. The relocated totem poles and a relocated house in New Kasaan were designated the Chief Son-I-Hat's Whale House and Totems Historic District in 2002.

== Geography ==
Kasaan is located at 55°32′30″N 132°24′7″W (55.541748, -132.401821).

According to the United States Census Bureau, the city has a total area of 6.2 square miles (16 km^{2}), of which, 5.3 square miles (14 km^{2}) of it is land and 0.9 square miles (2.3 km^{2}) of it (14.58%) is water.

Kasaan means "pretty town" in the Tlingit language.

== Demographics ==
Historical population
Census	Pop.	Note	%±
1910	129		—
1920	126		−2.3%
1930	112		−11.1%
1940	85		−24.1%
1950	47		−44.7%
1960	36		−23.4%
1970	30		−16.7%
1980	25		−16.7%
1990	54		116.0%
2000	39		−27.8%
2010	49		25.6%
2020	30		−38.8%
U.S. Decennial Census

Kasaan first appeared on the 1910 U.S. Census as an unincorporated Native village. It formally incorporated in 1976.

=== 2020 census ===
As of the 2020 census, Kasaan had a population of 30. The median age was 39.5 years. 33.3% of residents were under the age of 18 and 30.0% of residents were 65 years of age or older. For every 100 females there were 114.3 males, and for every 100 females age 18 and over there were 185.7 males age 18 and over.

0.0% of residents lived in urban areas, while 100.0% lived in rural areas.

There were 10 households in Kasaan, of which 20.0% had children under the age of 18 living in them. Of all households, 40.0% were married-couple households, 50.0% were households with a male householder and no spouse or partner present, and 0.0% were households with a female householder and no spouse or partner present. About 40.0% of all households were made up of individuals and 10.0% had someone living alone who was 65 years of age or older.

There were 18 housing units, of which 44.4% were vacant. The homeowner vacancy rate was 0.0% and the rental vacancy rate was 0.0%.

Racial composition as of the 2020 census
Race	Number	Percent
White	19	63.3%
Black or African American	0	0.0%
American Indian and Alaska Native	8	26.7%
Asian	0	0.0%
Native Hawaiian and Other Pacific Islander	1	3.3%
Some other race	0	0.0%
Two or more races	2	6.7%
Hispanic or Latino (of any race)	3	10.0%

=== 2000 census ===
As of the 2000 census, there were 39 people, 17 households, and 12 families residing in the city. The population density was 7.3 inhabitants per square mile (2.8/km^{2}). There were 39 housing units at an average density of 7.3 units per square mile (2.8 units/km^{2}). The racial makeup was 20 White residents, 15 Native American, and 4 from two or more races; 1 resident was Hispanic or Latino of any race.

There were 17 households, out of which 3 had children under the age of 18 living with them, 11 were married couples living together, 1 had a female householder with no husband present, and 5 were non-families. 4 households were made up of individuals, and none had someone living alone who was 65 years of age or older. The average household size was 2.29 and the average family size was 2.75.

In the city, the age distribution of the population shows 8 residents under the age of 18, 3 from 18 to 24, 9 from 25 to 44, 15 from 45 to 64, and 4 who were 65 years of age or older. The median age was 45 years. There were 22 male residents and 17 female, with 18 and 13 over the age of 18, giving a ratio of 129.4 males per 100 females and 138.5 males per 100 females age 18 and over.

The median income for a household was $43,500, and the median income for a family was $42,500. Males had a median income of $36,250 versus $0 for females. The per capita income was $19,743. No residents were living below the poverty line.

== Government ==
A second-class city, Kasaan is administered by a mayor and city council, of which the mayor is a member. City elections are conducted on the first Tuesday of October, and city council meetings are held on the third Tuesday of each month.

== Education ==
The area is served by the Barry Craig Stewart Kasaan School, which is part of the Southeast Island School District.

== See also ==
- List of Haida villages
