= South Prince of Wales Wilderness =

Protected area in Alaska, United States

Coordinates: 54°56′22″N 132°20′05″W

The South Prince of Wales Wilderness is a wilderness area on Prince of Wales Island, Alaska, protecting 90,968 acres of undeveloped Pacific temperate rainforest, much of which is old-growth. Managed by the United States Forest Service as part of the Tongass National Forest, the wilderness area was designated in a provision of the 1980 Alaska National Interest Lands Conservation Act. This wilderness contains 75 or more islands that range from a few to over 500 acres in size. The South Prince of Wales Wilderness sees tidal bores, tidal surges, fierce winds, and heavy storms regularly.
