= Coffman Cove, Alaska =

City in Alaska, United States

Coffman Cove Tatxánk
- City
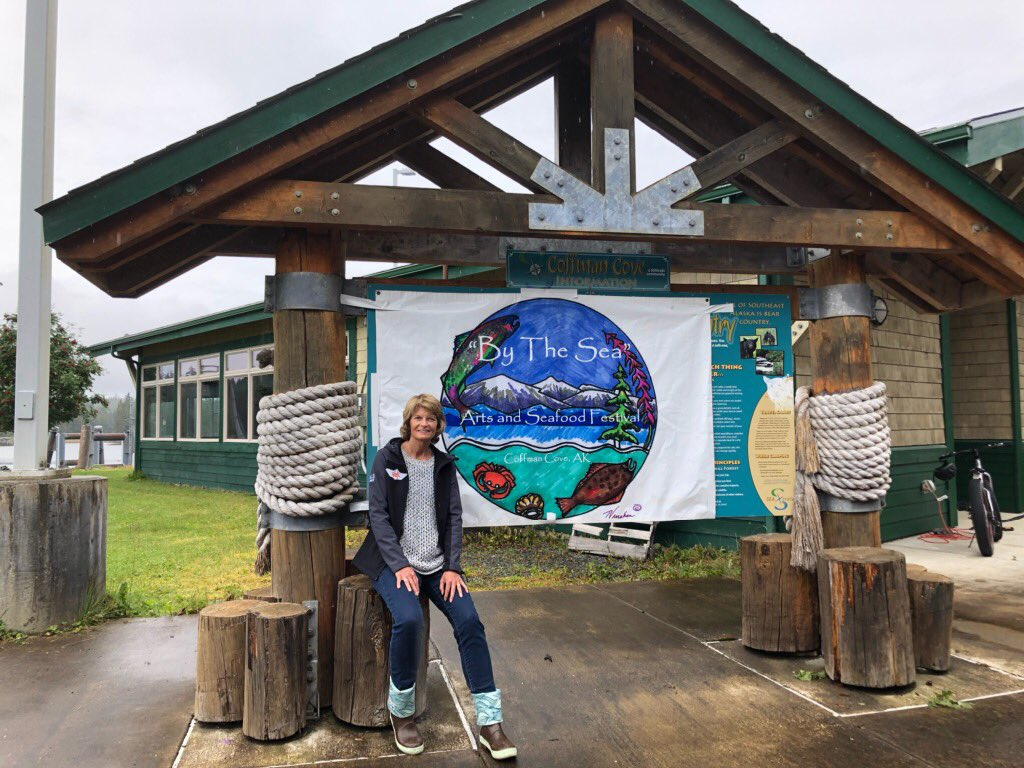
- Lisa Murkowski visiting Coffman Cove in 2019
- Motto: "Alaska's Hidden Secret on Prince of Wales Island!"
- Location in Alaska
- Coordinates: 56°00′44″N 132°49′44″W
- Country: United States
- State: Alaska
- Borough: Unorganized
- Founded: 1886
- Incorporated: October 23, 1989

Government
  - Mayor: Mikael Ashe
  - State senator: Bert Stedman (R)
  - State rep.: Dan Ortiz (I)

Area
  - Total: 13.29 sq mi (34.41 km^{2})
  - Land: 10.90 sq mi (28.22 km^{2})
  - Water: 2.39 sq mi (6.19 km^{2})
- Elevation: 56 ft (17 m)

Population (2020)
  - Total: 127
  - Density: 12/sq mi (4.5/km^{2})
- Time zone: UTC-9 (Alaska (AKST))
  - Summer (DST): UTC-8 (AKDT)
- Zip code: 99918
- Area code: 907
- FIPS code: 02-16360
- GNIS feature ID: 1669437
- Website: www.CCAlaska.com

Coffman Cove (Lingít: Tatxánk) is a city in Prince of Wales-Hyder Census Area, Alaska, in the United States. Located on Prince of Wales Island, it had a population of 127 at the 2020 census.

== Geography ==
Coffman Cove is located at 56°0′44″N 132°49′44″W (56.012137, -132.828840).

According to the United States Census Bureau, the city has a total area of 14.9 square miles (39 km^{2}), of which, 10.4 square miles (27 km^{2}) of it is land and 4.5 square miles (12 km^{2}) of it (30.03%) is water.

== Demographics ==
Historical population
Census	Pop.	Note	%±
1980	193		—
1990	186		−3.6%
2000	199		7.0%
2010	176		−11.6%
2020	127		−27.8%
U.S. Decennial Census

Coffman Cove first appeared on the 1980 U.S. Census as a census-designated place (CDP). It was incorporated as a city in 1989.

=== 2020 census ===
As of the 2020 census, Coffman Cove had a population of 127. The median age was 62.4 years. 8.7% of residents were under the age of 18 and 37.8% of residents were 65 years of age or older. For every 100 females there were 130.9 males, and for every 100 females age 18 and over there were 132.0 males age 18 and over.

0.0% of residents lived in urban areas, while 100.0% lived in rural areas.

There were 69 households in Coffman Cove, of which 14.5% had children under the age of 18 living in them. Of all households, 46.4% were married-couple households, 33.3% were households with a male householder and no spouse or partner present, and 11.6% were households with a female householder and no spouse or partner present. About 40.6% of all households were made up of individuals and 18.8% had someone living alone who was 65 years of age or older.

There were 174 housing units, of which 60.3% were vacant. The homeowner vacancy rate was 6.9% and the rental vacancy rate was 11.1%.

Racial composition as of the 2020 census
Race	Number	Percent
White	114	89.8%
Black or African American	0	0.0%
American Indian and Alaska Native	8	6.3%
Asian	0	0.0%
Native Hawaiian and Other Pacific Islander	0	0.0%
Some other race	0	0.0%
Two or more races	5	3.9%
Hispanic or Latino (of any race)	1	0.8%

=== 2000 census ===
As of the census of 2000, there were 199 people, 63 households, and 42 families residing in the city. The population density was 19.2 people per square mile (7.4/km^{2}). There were 99 housing units at an average density of 9.5 per square mile (3.7/km^{2}). The racial makeup of the city was 87.44% White, 0.50% Black or African American, 2.51% Native American, 0.50% Asian, 5.03% from other races, and 4.02% from two or more races. 1.01% of the population were Hispanic or Latino of any race.

There were 63 households, out of which 31.7% had children under the age of 18 living with them, 54.0% were married couples living together, 4.8% had a female householder with no husband present, and 33.3% were non-families. 25.4% of all households were made up of individuals, and 6.3% had someone living alone who was 65 years of age or older. The average household size was 2.56 and the average family size was 3.00.

In the city, the age distribution of the population shows 21.1% under the age of 18, 7.5% from 18 to 24, 32.7% from 25 to 44, 32.2% from 45 to 64, and 6.5% who were 65 years of age or older. The median age was 40 years. For every 100 females, there were 168.9 males. For every 100 females age 18 and over, there were 180.4 males.

The median income for a household in the city was $43,750, and the median income for a family was $44,861. Males had a median income of $52,031 versus $31,250 for females. The per capita income for the city was $23,249. About 6.7% of families and 4.9% of the population were below the poverty line, including none of those under the age of eighteen and 21.4% of those 65 or over.

== Climate ==
Usual for Southeast Alaska, it has either an oceanic climate (Köppen climate classification: Cfb) using the -3 °C isotherm or a warm-summer humid continental climate (Köppen climate classification: Dfb) when the 0 °C isotherm is utilised. Also usual for Southeast Alaska, the area is a temperate rainforest, with high levels of precipitation, as well as mild summers alongside cold winters (although mild by Alaskan standards, especially when compared to cities like Fairbanks).

Climate data for Coffman Cove, Alaska
Month	Jan	Feb	Mar	Apr	May	Jun	Jul	Aug	Sep	Oct	Nov	Dec	Year
Mean daily maximum °F (°C)	35.4 (1.9)	37.7 (3.2)	42.3 (5.7)	47.7 (8.7)	54.2 (12.3)	59.6 (15.3)	65.4 (18.6)	64.6 (18.1)	59.4 (15.2)	50.1 (10.1)	41.4 (5.2)	38.4 (3.6)	49.6 (9.8)
Mean daily minimum °F (°C)	23.7 (−4.6)	25.0 (−3.9)	28.2 (−2.1)	33.4 (0.8)	37.5 (3.1)	43.4 (6.3)	48.5 (9.2)	48.0 (8.9)	42.7 (5.9)	37.1 (2.8)	30.2 (−1.0)	27.6 (−2.4)	35.4 (1.9)
Average precipitation inches (mm)	9.8 (250)	7.3 (190)	6.2 (160)	5.9 (150)	4.9 (120)	4.5 (110)	3.6 (91)	4.0 (100)	7.1 (180)	12.3 (310)	7.4 (190)	9.1 (230)	81.8 (2,080)
Average snowfall inches (cm)	21.7 (55)	10.5 (27)	13 (33)	1.3 (3.3)	0.0 (0.0)	0 (0)	0 (0)	0 (0)	0 (0)	0.1 (0.25)	4.1 (10)	15.8 (40)	66.5 (169)

== Transportation ==
=== Air ===
Klawock Airport is the only airport on Prince of Wales Island serving wheeled aircraft. Regular scheduled and charter float planes provide service to many of the island's coastal communities, including Coffman Cove. Scheduled service to Coffman Cove is provided by Taquan Air.

=== Ferry ===
On March 12, 2009, the Inter-Island Ferry Authority announced that ferry service to Coffman Cove would be suspended for the remainder of 2009.

As of June 2020, one can take the ferry into Coffman Cove with the Alaska Marine Hi-way from Bellingham, Washington or Prince Rupert, Canada with connections in Ketchikan, Alaska on the Inter Island Authority (IFA) into Hollis.

=== Roads ===
Prince of Wales island's road system is composed primarily of forest logging roads, with the more heavily traveled routes between island communities upgraded. Many of the roads on the island have been upgraded and paved. Coffman Cove and other communities are now connected by wide, modern roads well bedded, paved with asphalt.

=== Shuttles and taxis ===
There are a few shuttle bus or taxi cab companies (based in Craig & Klawock) providing regular service between Coffman Cove & the Hollis ferry terminal and the other island communities.

== Education ==
Southeast Island School District operates Howard Valentine Coffman Cove School.
