= Point Baker, Alaska =

Point Baker, Alaska X̱aaséedák’u
- CDP
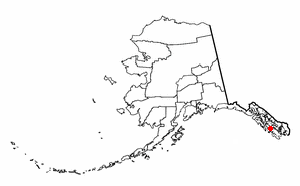
- Location of Point Baker, Alaska

- Location of Point Baker in the state of Alaska, United States
- Coordinates: 56°21′9″N 133°37′43″W
- Country: United States
- State: Alaska

Government
  - State senator: Bert Stedman (R)
  - State rep.: Rebecca Himschoot (I)

Area
  - Total: 0.88 sq mi (2.28 km^{2})
  - Land: 0.88 sq mi (2.28 km^{2})
  - Water: 0.039 sq mi (0.10 km^{2})
- Elevation: 16 ft (5 m)

Population (2020)
  - Total: 12
  - Density: 13.6/sq mi (5.27/km^{2})
- Time zone: UTC-9 (Alaska (AKST))
  - Summer (DST): UTC-8 (AKDT)
- ZIP code: 99927
- Area code: 907
- FIPS code: 02-61190
- GNIS feature ID: 1424323

Point Baker (Lingít: X̱aaséedák’u) is a census-designated place (CDP) in Prince of Wales-Hyder Census Area, Alaska, United States. The population was 12 at the 2020 census, down from 15 in 2010 and 35 in 2000.

== Geography ==
Point Baker is located at 56°21′9″N 133°37′43″W (56.352425, −133.628479).

According to the United States Census Bureau, the CDP has a total area of 0.88 square miles (2.3 km^{2}), of which, 0.88 square miles (2.3 km^{2}) of it is land and 0.04 square miles (0.10 km^{2}) of it (3.96%) is water.

=== Climate ===
Climate data for Point Baker, Alaska (1991–2020 normals, extremes 2002–2020)
Month	Jan	Feb	Mar	Apr	May	Jun	Jul	Aug	Sep	Oct	Nov	Dec	Year
Record high °F (°C)	62 (17)	53 (12)	58 (14)	69 (21)	72 (22)	85 (29)	79 (26)	80 (27)	69 (21)	60 (16)	59 (15)	52 (11)	85 (29)
Mean maximum °F (°C)	48.7 (9.3)	47.7 (8.7)	49.5 (9.7)	56.7 (13.7)	66.5 (19.2)	70.9 (21.6)	70.9 (21.6)	70.1 (21.2)	63.0 (17.2)	55.7 (13.2)	51.2 (10.7)	47.1 (8.4)	74.6 (23.7)
Mean daily maximum °F (°C)	38.3 (3.5)	39.1 (3.9)	41.1 (5.1)	46.9 (8.3)	52.9 (11.6)	57.3 (14.1)	59.6 (15.3)	60.8 (16.0)	55.8 (13.2)	48.9 (9.4)	42.1 (5.6)	38.9 (3.8)	48.5 (9.2)
Daily mean °F (°C)	34.5 (1.4)	35.1 (1.7)	36.5 (2.5)	41.6 (5.3)	47.2 (8.4)	51.8 (11.0)	54.4 (12.4)	54.9 (12.7)	50.7 (10.4)	44.4 (6.9)	38.4 (3.6)	35.3 (1.8)	43.7 (6.5)
Mean daily minimum °F (°C)	30.7 (−0.7)	31.2 (−0.4)	32.0 (0.0)	36.3 (2.4)	41.6 (5.3)	46.3 (7.9)	49.3 (9.6)	49.1 (9.5)	45.7 (7.6)	39.9 (4.4)	34.6 (1.4)	31.7 (−0.2)	39.0 (3.9)
Mean minimum °F (°C)	18.4 (−7.6)	20.9 (−6.2)	22.1 (−5.5)	30.4 (−0.9)	35.3 (1.8)	41.0 (5.0)	44.9 (7.2)	43.8 (6.6)	38.7 (3.7)	32.7 (0.4)	25.9 (−3.4)	23.1 (−4.9)	14.1 (−9.9)
Record low °F (°C)	8 (−13)	11 (−12)	8 (−13)	25 (−4)	31 (−1)	37 (3)	42 (6)	40 (4)	35 (2)	24 (−4)	14 (−10)	13 (−11)	8 (−13)
Average precipitation inches (mm)	8.36 (212)	5.24 (133)	5.06 (129)	4.79 (122)	4.79 (122)	2.91 (74)	5.02 (128)	6.60 (168)	10.73 (273)	11.06 (281)	9.33 (237)	8.39 (213)	82.28 (2,090)
Average snowfall inches (cm)	7.6 (19)	3.6 (9.1)	8.1 (21)	0.5 (1.3)	0.0 (0.0)	0.0 (0.0)	0.0 (0.0)	0.0 (0.0)	0.0 (0.0)	0.0 (0.0)	4.8 (12)	3.1 (7.9)	27.7 (70)
Average precipitation days (≥ 0.01 in)	21.7	15.1	20.8	18.5	16.7	14.4	16.4	17.6	19.6	23.3	23.7	22.0	229.8
Average snowy days	8.0	5.9	5.9	1.4	0.0	0.0	0.0	0.0	0.0	0.0	5.7	8.7	35.6
Source: NOAA

== History ==
In 1975, Point Baker and Port Protection made national news when Zieske v Butz, a landmark lawsuit against the US Forest Service brought by Pnt Baker residents Charles Zieske, Alan Stein, and Herb Zieske, was decided by Judge James von der Heydt, the Alaska Federal District court judge. The lawsuit was initiated by Alan Stein and the Point Baker Association which had about 30 fishermen members from the communities of Point Baker and Port Protection. On December 24, 1975, von der Hedyt issued an injunction against all clearcutting on the North end of the Prince of Wales island from Red Bay to Calder Bay. The lawsuit stopped planned clear cutting on 400,000 acres (1,600 km^{2}) on the north end Island. Congress lifted the injunction when it passed the National Forest Management Act in 1976.

Twice more Point Baker and Port Protection made headlines in 1989, in a landmark lawsuit called Stein v Barton, many of its residents fought for buffer strips on all the salmon streams of the Tongass and for protection of the Salmon Bay watershed. In the 1990 Tongass Timber Reform Act, lobbyists for an environmental group in Washington compromised with Senator Ted Stevens and only got part of the Salmon Bay watershed protected. The timber surrounding an important salmon stream was bargained away. This statute also protected all the salmon streams in the Tongass with 100-foot-wide (30 m) buffer strips during logging operations.

In February 2010, Senators Murkowski and Begich are pushing Senate Bill 881 through Congress. The bill has gone through extensive community meetings and subsequently the bill has changed and controversial areas, such as north Prince of Wales, have been removed from the draft bill. The draft bill privatizes significant acreage of National Forest Land by conveying it into the exclusive ownership of SEALASKA, a native Alaskan corporation.

In 2011, having failed to pass S 881 and almost lost her seat as a result to Joe Miller in the election, Murkowski introduced S 730. Nine Alaskan towns have opposed the bill so far. Sealaska would get the largest volume class timber remaining which is vital to protecting wolves and goshawks, both of which could be listed as endangered.

Recently a recall petition has been launched from Point Baker's sister community, Edna Bay: http://www.ednabayalaska.net/

== Demographics ==
Historical population
Census	Pop.	Note	%±
1940	29		—
1950	81		179.3%
1980	90		—
1990	39		−56.7%
2000	35		−10.3%
2010	15		−57.1%
2020	12		−20.0%
U.S. Decennial Census

Point Baker first appeared on the 1940 U.S. Census as an unincorporated village. It reappeared on the 1950 census. It did not report again until 1980, when it was made a census-designated place (CDP).

As of the census of 2000, there were 35 people, 13 households, and 9 families residing in the CDP. The population density was 36.4 inhabitants per square mile (14.1/km^{2}). There were 23 housing units at an average density of 23.9 per square mile (9.2/km^{2}). The racial makeup of the CDP was 91.43% White, 2.86% Native American, and 5.71% from two or more races.

There were 13 households, out of which 23.1% had children under the age of 18 living with them, 61.5% were married couples living together, 15.4% had a female householder with no husband present, and 23.1% were non-families, 15.4% of all households were made up of individuals, and 7.7% had someone living alone who was 65 years of age or older. The average household size was 2.69 and the average family size was 3.00.

In the CDP, the age distribution of the population shows 25.7% under the age of 18, 2.9% from 18 to 24, 25.7% from 25 to 44, 25.7% from 45 to 64, and 20.0% who were 65 years of age or older. The median age was 43 years. For every 100 females, there were 105.9 males. For every 100 females age 18 and over, there were 116.7 males.

The median income for a household in the CDP was $28,000, and the median income for a family was $28,250. Males had a median income of $0 versus $31,250 for females. The per capita income for the CDP was $12,580. There were no families and 4.9% of the population living below the poverty line, including no under eighteens and none of those over 64.
