= Thorne Bay, Alaska =

Thorne Bay
- City
- Flag

- Location in Alaska
- Coordinates: 55°40′38″N 132°33′22″W
- Country: United States
- State: Alaska
- Incorporated: August 9, 1982

Government
  - Mayor: Harvey McDonald
  - State senator: Bert Stedman (R)
  - State rep.: Rebecca Himschoot (I)

Area
  - Total: 29.72 sq mi (76.97 km^{2})
  - Land: 26.67 sq mi (69.08 km^{2})
  - Water: 3.04 sq mi (7.88 km^{2})
- Elevation: 128 ft (39 m)

Population (2020)
  - Total: 476
  - Density: 17.8/sq mi (6.89/km^{2})
- Time zone: UTC-9 (Alaska (AKST))
  - Summer (DST): UTC-8 (AKDT)
- ZIP code: 99919
- Area code: 907
- FIPS code: 02-77140
- GNIS feature ID: 1669435

Thorne Bay is a city in Prince of Wales-Hyder Census Area, Alaska, United States. As of the 2020 census the population was 476, up from 471 in 2010.

== Geography ==
Thorne Bay is located at 55°40′38″N 132°33′22″W.

According to the United States Census Bureau, the city has a total area of 30.4 square miles (79 km^{2}), of which, 25.5 square miles (66 km^{2}) of it is land and 4.8 square miles (12 km^{2}) of it (15.85%) is water.

=== Climate ===
The average temperature of Thorne Bay is 45 °F, which is much higher than the Alaska average temperature of 32 °F and is much lower than the national average temperature of 54 °F.

Thorne Bay

Climate chart (precipitation, max. and min. temperature)
J	F	M	A	M	J	J	A	S	O	N	D
11 37 28	8.5 40 28	8.2 44 31	6.6 49 33	4.2 58 40	3.1 63 46	3.3 66 50	4.9 66 50	9.9 59 44	16 50 39	15 42 33	13 38 30
- █ Average max. and min. temperatures in °F
- █ Precipitation totals in inches
- Source: WeatherBase.com (13 March, 2021)
Metric conversion
J	F	M	A	M	J	J	A	S	O	N	D
267 3 −2	216 4 −2	208 7 −1	168 9 1	107 14 4	79 17 8	84 19 10	124 19 10	251 15 7	406 10 4	376 6 1	330 3 −1
- █ Average max. and min. temperatures in °C
- █ Precipitation totals in mm

Climate data for Thorne Bay, Alaska (1991–2020 normals, extremes 2007–present)
Month	Jan	Feb	Mar	Apr	May	Jun	Jul	Aug	Sep	Oct	Nov	Dec	Year
Record high °F (°C)	59 (15)	52 (11)	66 (19)	73 (23)	84 (29)	89 (32)	90 (32)	90 (32)	83 (28)	71 (22)	58 (14)	55 (13)	90 (32)
Mean maximum °F (°C)	49.3 (9.6)	48.2 (9.0)	51.9 (11.1)	61.1 (16.2)	72.2 (22.3)	77.7 (25.4)	82.6 (28.1)	77.8 (25.4)	70.6 (21.4)	59.9 (15.5)	51.2 (10.7)	46.9 (8.3)	85.2 (29.6)
Mean daily maximum °F (°C)	38.2 (3.4)	39.6 (4.2)	42.7 (5.9)	49.9 (9.9)	57.1 (13.9)	62.6 (17.0)	65.5 (18.6)	65.3 (18.5)	58.9 (14.9)	50.6 (10.3)	41.8 (5.4)	37.7 (3.2)	50.8 (10.4)
Daily mean °F (°C)	33.2 (0.7)	33.9 (1.1)	36.2 (2.3)	41.9 (5.5)	48.6 (9.2)	54.4 (12.4)	58.1 (14.5)	57.8 (14.3)	52.1 (11.2)	44.3 (6.8)	37.0 (2.8)	33.7 (0.9)	44.3 (6.8)
Mean daily minimum °F (°C)	28.1 (−2.2)	28.3 (−2.1)	29.7 (−1.3)	33.9 (1.1)	40.0 (4.4)	46.2 (7.9)	50.6 (10.3)	50.2 (10.1)	45.2 (7.3)	38.0 (3.3)	32.2 (0.1)	29.6 (−1.3)	37.7 (3.2)
Mean minimum °F (°C)	14.8 (−9.6)	15.8 (−9.0)	18.8 (−7.3)	26.4 (−3.1)	32.1 (0.1)	38.8 (3.8)	43.7 (6.5)	44.4 (6.9)	36.2 (2.3)	28.5 (−1.9)	22.4 (−5.3)	16.3 (−8.7)	8.5 (−13.1)
Record low °F (°C)	2 (−17)	7 (−14)	8 (−13)	17 (−8)	25 (−4)	34 (1)	38 (3)	32 (0)	32 (0)	17 (−8)	11 (−12)	−2 (−19)	−2 (−19)
Average precipitation inches (mm)	8.16 (207)	5.46 (139)	6.25 (159)	5.09 (129)	3.51 (89)	4.08 (104)	5.30 (135)	6.98 (177)	8.63 (219)	12.12 (308)	10.52 (267)	9.08 (231)	85.18 (2,164)
Average snowfall inches (cm)	11.7 (30)	11.7 (30)	8.7 (22)	0.6 (1.5)	0.0 (0.0)	0.0 (0.0)	0.0 (0.0)	0.0 (0.0)	0.0 (0.0)	0.0 (0.0)	7.2 (18)	8.2 (21)	48.1 (122)
Average precipitation days (≥ 0.01 in)	21.7	15.1	20.8	18.5	16.7	14.4	16.4	17.6	19.6	23.3	23.7	22.0	229.8
Average snowy days	4.8	3.6	3.4	0.5	0.0	0.0	0.0	0.0	0.0	0.0	2.9	3.9	19.1
Source: NOAA

== Demographics ==
Historical population
Census	Pop.	Note	%±
1890	17		—
1970	443		—
1980	320		−27.8%
1990	569		77.8%
2000	557		−2.1%
2010	471		−15.4%
2020	476		1.1%
U.S. Decennial Census

Thorne Bay first appeared on the 1890 census as the unincorporated settlement of "Tolstoi Bay." It had 17 residents, of which 13 were Native and 4 were White. It would not appear again until 1970 when it returned as Thorne Bay, also an unincorporated village. It was made a census-designated place (CDP) in 1980. It formally incorporated in 1982.

=== 2020 census ===
As of the 2020 census, Thorne Bay had a population of 476. The median age was 48.0 years. 18.5% of residents were under the age of 18 and 22.3% of residents were 65 years of age or older. For every 100 females there were 124.5 males, and for every 100 females age 18 and over there were 124.3 males age 18 and over.

0.0% of residents lived in urban areas, while 100.0% lived in rural areas.

There were 208 households in Thorne Bay, of which 23.1% had children under the age of 18 living in them. Of all households, 52.9% were married-couple households, 26.4% were households with a male householder and no spouse or partner present, and 12.5% were households with a female householder and no spouse or partner present. About 31.8% of all households were made up of individuals and 10.6% had someone living alone who was 65 years of age or older.

There were 348 housing units, of which 40.2% were vacant. The homeowner vacancy rate was 1.2% and the rental vacancy rate was 25.4%.

Racial composition as of the 2020 census
Race	Number	Percent
White	399	83.8%
Black or African American	3	0.6%
American Indian and Alaska Native	31	6.5%
Asian	0	0.0%
Native Hawaiian and Other Pacific Islander	4	0.8%
Some other race	3	0.6%
Two or more races	36	7.6%
Hispanic or Latino (of any race)	9	1.9%

=== 2000 census ===
As of the census of 2000, there were 557 people and 219 households, including 157 families, residing in the city. The population density was 21.8 inhabitants per square mile (8.4/km^{2}). There were 327 housing units at an average density of 12.8 per square mile (4.9/km^{2}). The racial makeup of the city was 92.46% Caucasian, 2.87% Alaska Native, 0.18% Pacific Islander, 0.54% from other races, and 3.95% from two or more races. 1.26% of the population were Hispanic or Latino of any race.

There were 219 households, out of which 35.2% had children under the age of 18 living with them, 61.6% were married couples living together, 4.6% had a female householder with no husband present, and 28.3% were non-families. 23.7% of all households were made up of individuals, and 2.7% had someone living alone who was 65 years of age or older. The average household size was 2.54 and the average family size was 3.03.

In the city, the age distribution of the population shows 28.4% under the age of 18, 6.5% from 18 to 24, 30.5% from 25 to 44, 30.3% from 45 to 64, and 4.3% who were 65 years of age or older. The median age was 39 years. For every 100 females, there were 115.9 males. For every 100 females age 18 and over, there were 122.9 males.

The median income for a household in the city was $45,625, and the median income for a family was $46,875. Males had a median income of $40,893 versus $34,375 for females. The per capita income for the city was $20,836. About 6.3% of families and 7.8% of the population were below the poverty line, including 5.4% of those under age 18 and 7.1% of those age 65 or over.

== Namesake ==
Thorne Bay is named for Frank Manly Thorn (1836–1907), who served as the sixth Superintendent of the United States Coast and Geodetic Survey from 1885 to 1889. The name of the bay was misspelled when published in the original record, and the spelling was never corrected to match the spelling of Thorn's last name.

== History and culture ==
Thorne Bay originally began as a large logging camp for the Ketchikan Pulp Company in 1960 that was originally located in Hollis. Being a floating camp at the time, most Hollis residents resided in float houses. In the 1960s and 1970s it was the largest logging camp in North America and was host to over 1500 residents at its peak. It became a second-class city in 1982 and in 2001 the logging company pulled out having been a victim of breach of contract from the U.S. Forest Service. The U.S. Forest Service signed a fifty-year contract in 1954 guaranteeing 150 million board foot (350 thousand m^{3}) per year for the pulp mill and sawmills in Ketchikan. By 1990 that figure was down to approximately 50 million board foot (120 thousand m^{3}) per year. Currently Thorne Bay features many seasonal residents and an employment sector based primarily in Forest Service and public education.

== World's largest logging camp ==
In the 1960s–1970s, Thorne Bay was the world's largest logging camp. Thorne Bay also has the world's largest tree grapple, which is known as "the claw". The grapple sits in front of the small town with a sign that says "Thorne Bay".

== Education ==
The school is the Thorne Bay School, operated by Southeast Island School District.
