= Lituya =

Lituya may refer to:

- Lituya Bay, in Alaska, the United States
- Lituya Mountain, peak in the Fairweather Range of Alaska, the United States
- Lituya Glacier, tidewater glacier in Alaska, the United States
- MV Lituya, shuttle ferry for the Alaska Marine Highway System
