= Klawock, Alaska =

City in Alaska, U.S.

Klawock Lawáak
- City
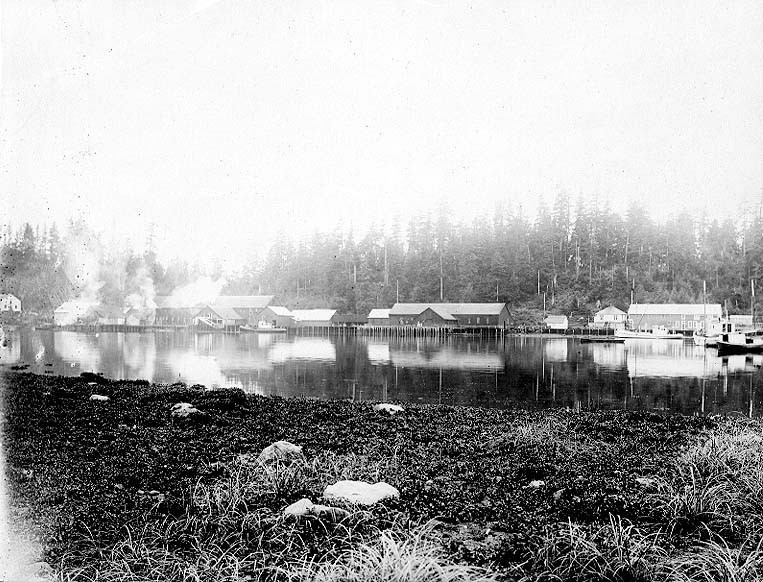
- North Pacific Trading and Packing cannery in Klawak, early 20th century

- Seal
- Nickname: Site of the First Salmon Cannery in Alaska
- Motto: kla-na-kee-duk
- Location in Alaska
- Coordinates: 55°33′18″N 133°05′07″W
- Country: United States
- State: Alaska
- Borough: Unorganized
- Census area: Prince of Wales–Hyder
- Founded: 1868
- Incorporated: October 29, 1929

Government
  - Mayor: Donald Nickerson Jr.
  - State senator: Bert Stedman (R)
  - State rep.: Rebecca Himschoot (I)

Area
  - Total: 0.97 sq mi (2.52 km^{2})
  - Land: 0.68 sq mi (1.76 km^{2})
  - Water: 0.29 sq mi (0.75 km^{2}) 34.83%
- Elevation: 79 ft (24 m)

Population (2020)
  - Total: 720
  - Density: 1,057.5/sq mi (408.32/km^{2})
- Time zone: UTC-9 (AKST)
  - Summer (DST): UTC-8 (AKDT)
- Zip code: 99925
- Area code: 907
- FIPS code: 02-40400
- GNIS feature ID: 1423100
- Website: www.cityofklawock.com

Klawock (Tlingit: Lawáak) is a city in Prince of Wales–Hyder Census Area, in the U.S. state of Alaska, on the west coast of Prince of Wales Island, on Klawock Inlet, across from Klawock Island. As of the 2020 census, Klawock had a population of 720. It is located 56 miles (90 km) from Ketchikan, 7 miles (11 km) from Craig, and 24 miles (39 km) from Hollis.

Klawock is the headquarters of the Klawock Cooperative Association, a federally recognized tribe of Tlingit Native Americans.

== History ==
Klawock's first settlers were Tlingit who came from the northern winter village of Tuxekan. They used it as a fishing camp for the summer period, and called it by several different names: Klawerak, Tlevak, Clevak, and Klawak. The name "Klawock" is derived from the Tlingit name Lawá, the man who founded the community. In 1853 a Russian navigator referred to the village as "Klyakkhan", and in 1855 as "Thlewakh".

In 1868, European Americans opened a trading post and a salmon saltery; some years later, in 1878, a San Francisco firm opened the first cannery in Alaska. In the following decades, several others were established. A United States post office was established in 1882. The 1890 census recorded the town's population as 260.

The Alaska Native Brotherhood (ANB) and Alaska Native Sisterhood (ANS), nonprofit organizations working for civil rights of Alaska Natives, were established by residents in 1912. Its founders and many volunteers built the Town Hall and a community center in 1939, during the Great Depression.

In 1929 the town was incorporated as a city, and in 1934 Congress awarded federal funding for the expansion of the cannery, on the condition that the community remains liquor-free. At the same time, the Klawock Cooperative Association (a nonprofit organization) was formed to manage the cannery.

In 1931 John Barrymore looted a Totem pole from the abandoned village of Tuxekan; in 2015 the pole was returned to the Tlingit.

== Geography ==
Klawock is located at 55°33′18″N 133°05′07″W. According to the United States Census Bureau, the city has a total area of 0.9 square miles (2.3 km^{2}), of which 0.6 square miles (1.6 km^{2}) is land and 0.3 square miles (0.78 km^{2}) (34.83%) is water.

=== Climate ===
Klawock has a warm-summer oceanic climate.

Climate data for Klawock, Alaska (Klawock Airport), 1991–2020 normals, extremes 1997–present
Month	Jan	Feb	Mar	Apr	May	Jun	Jul	Aug	Sep	Oct	Nov	Dec	Year
Record high °F (°C)	64 (18)	58 (14)	71 (22)	81 (27)	86 (30)	92 (33)	94 (34)	84 (29)	83 (28)	68 (20)	59 (15)	66 (19)	94 (34)
Mean maximum °F (°C)	51.2 (10.7)	51.4 (10.8)	56.2 (13.4)	62.7 (17.1)	73.5 (23.1)	74.0 (23.3)	74.1 (23.4)	73.7 (23.2)	72.3 (22.4)	61.3 (16.3)	52.1 (11.2)	50.0 (10.0)	80.0 (26.7)
Mean daily maximum °F (°C)	39.5 (4.2)	41.3 (5.2)	44.3 (6.8)	50.7 (10.4)	56.8 (13.8)	60.5 (15.8)	63.1 (17.3)	64.3 (17.9)	59.8 (15.4)	51.7 (10.9)	43.5 (6.4)	40.1 (4.5)	51.3 (10.7)
Daily mean °F (°C)	35.3 (1.8)	35.9 (2.2)	37.8 (3.2)	42.9 (6.1)	49.0 (9.4)	53.4 (11.9)	56.9 (13.8)	57.5 (14.2)	53.3 (11.8)	45.7 (7.6)	38.9 (3.8)	35.7 (2.1)	45.2 (7.3)
Mean daily minimum °F (°C)	31.1 (−0.5)	30.4 (−0.9)	31.4 (−0.3)	35.2 (1.8)	41.1 (5.1)	46.4 (8.0)	50.6 (10.3)	50.6 (10.3)	46.8 (8.2)	39.7 (4.3)	34.3 (1.3)	31.4 (−0.3)	39.1 (3.9)
Mean minimum °F (°C)	16.8 (−8.4)	17.6 (−8.0)	19.7 (−6.8)	26.9 (−2.8)	32.5 (0.3)	39.0 (3.9)	44.8 (7.1)	44.9 (7.2)	36.5 (2.5)	29.9 (−1.2)	22.3 (−5.4)	19.1 (−7.2)	12.1 (−11.1)
Record low °F (°C)	−11 (−24)	−9 (−23)	−6 (−21)	10 (−12)	27 (−3)	33 (1)	39 (4)	37 (3)	27 (−3)	2 (−17)	−4 (−20)	−3 (−19)	−11 (−24)
Average precipitation inches (mm)	8.65 (220)	6.33 (161)	6.82 (173)	5.51 (140)	4.10 (104)	3.41 (87)	4.27 (108)	6.79 (172)	10.72 (272)	12.33 (313)	10.17 (258)	10.10 (257)	89.20 (2,266)
Average precipitation days (≥ 0.01 in)	22.4	17.7	21.1	19.8	18.2	17.5	18.5	19.1	21.5	23.6	22.9	22.2	244.5
Source 1: NOAA
Source 2: National Weather Service (mean maxima/minima 2006–2020)

== Demographics ==
Historical population
Census	Pop.	Note	%±
1880	27		—
1890	287		963.0%
1900	131		−54.4%
1910	241		84.0%
1920	19		−92.1%
1930	437		2,200.0%
1940	455		4.1%
1950	404		−11.2%
1960	251		−37.9%
1970	213		−15.1%
1980	318		49.3%
1990	722		127.0%
2000	854		18.3%
2010	755		−11.6%
2020	720		−4.6%
U.S. Decennial Census

Klawock first appeared on the 1880 United States census as the unincorporated Tlingit village of "Klawak". It continued to report as Klawak in 1890–1910, with the alternative spelling of "Klawock" first appearing in the latter census. In 1920, it was reported exclusively as Klawock. In 1929, it was officially incorporated.

=== 2020 census ===
As of the 2020 census, Klawock had a population of 720. The median age was 42.7 years. 22.8% of residents were under the age of 18 and 20.0% of residents were 65 years of age or older. For every 100 females there were 120.2 males, and for every 100 females age 18 and over there were 126.9 males age 18 and over.

0.0% of residents lived in urban areas, while 100.0% lived in rural areas.

There were 281 households in Klawock, of which 29.5% had children under the age of 18 living in them. Of all households, 44.5% were married-couple households, 27.0% were households with a male householder and no spouse or partner present, and 18.5% were households with a female householder and no spouse or partner present. About 26.3% of all households were made up of individuals and 6.4% had someone living alone who was 65 years of age or older.

There were 343 housing units, of which 18.1% were vacant. The homeowner vacancy rate was 0.5% and the rental vacancy rate was 15.0%.

Racial composition as of the 2020 census
Race	Number	Percent
White	240	33.3%
Black or African American	4	0.6%
American Indian and Alaska Native	341	47.4%
Asian	9	1.2%
Native Hawaiian and Other Pacific Islander	0	0.0%
Some other race	1	0.1%
Two or more races	125	17.4%
Hispanic or Latino (of any race)	12	1.7%

=== 2000 census ===
As of the census of 2000, there were 854 people, 313 households, and 215 families residing in the city. The population density was 1,465.4 inhabitants per square mile (565.8/km^{2}). There were 368 housing units at an average density of 631.4 per square mile (243.8/km^{2}). The racial makeup of the city was 40.98% White, 50.94% Native American, 0.47% Asian, 0.12% Pacific Islander, 0.12% from other races, and 7.38% from two or more races. 1.41% of the population were Hispanic or Latino of any race.

There were 313 households, out of which 36.1% had children under the age of 18 living with them, 49.2% were married couples living together, 10.2% had a female householder with no husband present, and 31.0% were non-families. 25.9% of all households were made up of individuals, and 3.8% had someone living alone who was 65 years of age or older. The average household size was 2.73 and the average family size was 3.25.

In the city, the age distribution of the population shows 30.1% under the age of 18, 7.4% from 18 to 24, 29.9% from 25 to 44, 26.1% from 45 to 64, and 6.6% who were 65 years of age or older. The median age was 34 years. For every 100 females, there were 124.1 males. For every 100 females age 18 and over, there were 134.1 males.

The median income for a household in the city was $35,000, and the median income for a family was $38,839. Males had a median income of $38,977 versus $23,036 for females. The per capita income for the city was $14,621. About 13.6% of families and 14.3% of the population were below the poverty line, including 16.5% of those under age 18 and 5.0% of those age 65 or over.

== Tourism ==
Klawock has the oldest hatchery in Alaska. This industry enhances the runs of salmon, including sockeye, coho, and steelhead. A sawmill and area logging operations are located here.

Klawock has a harbor, often used by tourists as a departure point for trips or boating exploration of the bays, inlets, and surrounding islands.

Each February 16, the ANB/ANS organizations sponsor the "Elizabeth Peratrovich Celebration" with ceremonies and a potluck, honoring the anniversary of the passage of the landmark legislation. The city also sponsors a summer festival, the "Celebration by the Sea."

A Totem Park has 21 totem poles, one of the largest collections in Alaska: it displays original and replica totems from the old village of Tuxekan. The city built a carving shed to house the poles during restoration, which can be visited. In 1998 the city commissioned the construction of a Long House (named Gaanì Ax Adi) with a new totem pole.

== Law and government ==
Klawock's local government consists of a mayor and council; as the settlement is within the Unorganized Borough, the next-highest authority is the state government. The local government manages the water, wastewater, refuse collection, trailer court, landfill, boat harbor, liquor store, and boat ramp utilities. There is a local sales tax of 5.5%, of which 0.5% is devoted to education, and no property tax.

There are four full-time police officers. There is also a volunteer fire department with 27 members, an EMS squad of 6–8 trained volunteers, and a search and rescue office (serving all of Prince of Wales Island) with 57 members.

== Education ==
There is a school with grades K-6 and Klawock High School with grades 7-12, both administered by the Klawock City School District. On average, 200 students are enrolled yearly. The Head Start school (three- to four-year-olds) is run by the Tlingit and Haida Central Council.

== Transportation ==
=== Airport ===
The 5,000-foot paved Klawock Airport is the only airport on Prince of Wales Island and serves as the air transport gateway for nearby Craig as well. It receives charters and daily scheduled passenger service from Ketchikan from Island Air Express. Alaska Seaplanes provides flights from Juneau and Sitka.

=== Ferry ===
Ferry service is available through the Inter-Island Ferry Authority from either Prince of Wales Island communities of Hollis (M/V Prince of Wales, with service to Ketchikan) or Coffman Cove (M/V Stikine, with service to Wrangell or Petersburg), which are both accessible through Prince of Wales' road system.

=== Cruise ships ===
A cruise ship port opened in Klawock in May 2024. The first ship to dock there was the Seabourn Odyssey, on an 80-day cruise that began in Sydney. The facility is owned and operated by Tlingit companies.

== Notable people ==
- Frank Peratrovich (1895–1984), then-mayor of Klawock and later president of the ANB, became one of the 55 delegates to the Alaska Constitutional Convention in 1955.
- Elizabeth Peratrovich (1911–1958), sister-in-law of Frank, president of the Alaska Native Sisterhood (ANS), worked in the 1940s on anti-discrimination legislation. She is credited with gaining Senate approval in 1945 due to her passionate testimony about the effects of discrimination. The state has recognized her contribution, naming February 16 and Gallery B of the State Capitol in her honor.
