= MV Lituya =

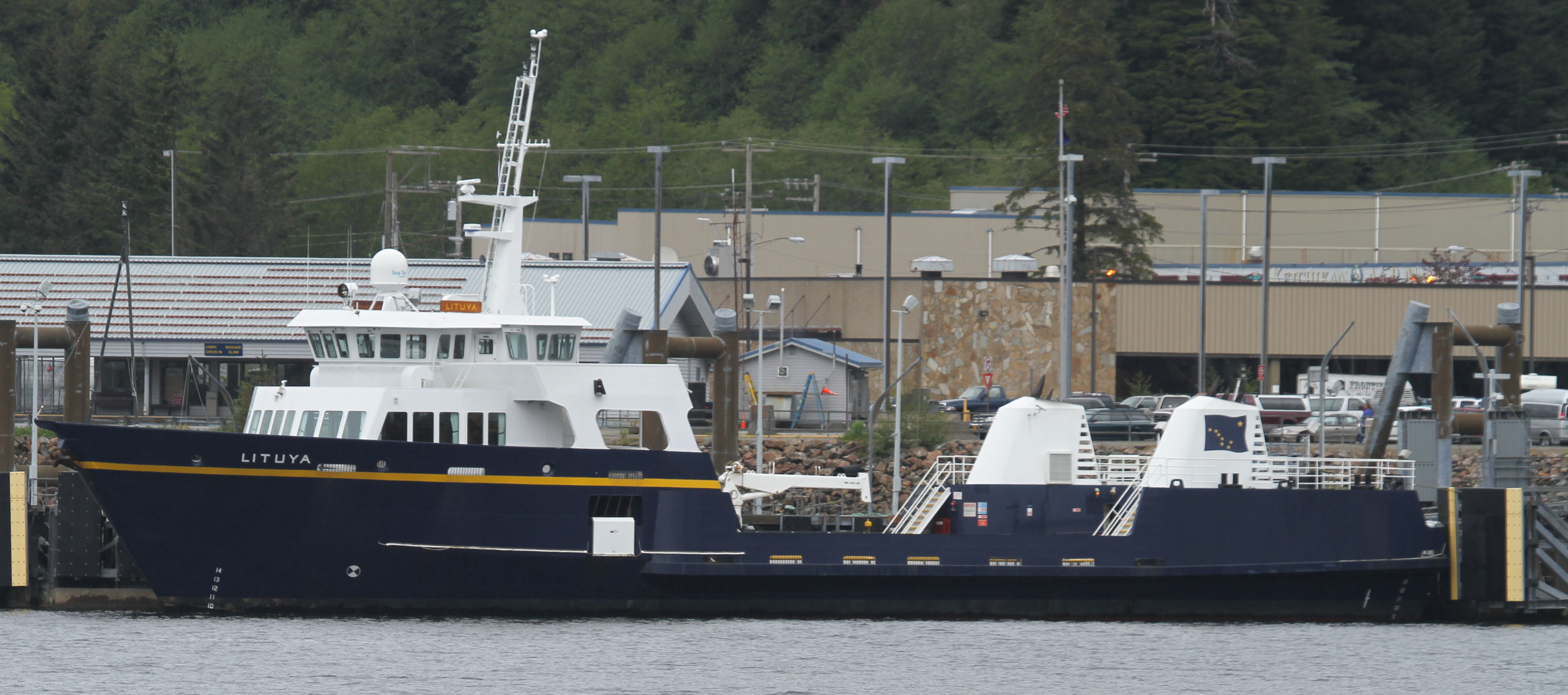
- Lituya in 2012

History

United States
- Name: M/V Lituya
- Namesake: Lituya Glacier, adjacent to Lituya Bay
- Operator: Alaska Marine Highway System
- Route: Metlakatla–Ketchikan
- Builder: Conrad Shipyard, Morgan City, Louisiana
- Launched: 2004
- Christened: December 13, 2004
- Home port: Metlakatla, Alaska
- Identification: IMO number: 9283148; MMSI number: 366919560; Callsign: WDB6180; Official Number: 1148179
- Status: in active service

General characteristics
- Tonnage: 758 gross tonnage
- Displacement: 647 long tons
- Length: 181 ft (55 m)
- Beam: 50 ft (15 m)
- Draft: 12 ft (3.7 m)
- Decks: One vehicle deck
- Ramps: Port, starboard, and aft ro-ro loading
- Installed power: 2 x Caterpillar 3508 B Diesel engines
- Propulsion: 2 x 3-bladed fixed-pitch propellers
- Speed: 11.5 knots (21.3 km/h; 13.2 mph)
- Capacity: 123 passengers; 15 vehicles
- Crew: 5

MV Lituya is a shuttle ferry operated by the Alaska Marine Highway System. Her route connects Metlakatla on Annette Island to Ketchikan.

== Construction and characteristics ==
The state of Alaska issued contracts for a ferry dock at Metlakatla in 1973. The town was originally served by Alaska Marine Highway System ferry M/V Chilkat. The terminal was later modified for use by M/V LeConte and M/V Aurora instead. During the summer there were several stops a week, but in the winter, the town had one ferry visit per week. Metlakatla residents argued for daily service, so that people could commute to work in Ketchikan. The state of Alaska issued a request for proposals for the design of a Metlakatla ferry on May 30, 2000. The Alaska Legislature appropriated $3 million for a new ferry and $880,000 for a new ferry terminal for it to dock at as part of the state's 2001 budget.

Lituya was designed by Coastwise Engineering of Juneau, Alaska in 2001. She was built by Conrad Shipyards in Morgan City, Louisiana, which won the contract in November 2002. She was christened In Morgan City on December 13, 2004 by Carolyn Leman, wife of Alaska Lieutenant Governor Loren Leman. Her contract price was $9.5 million.

Lituya is 181 feet (55 m) long, with a beam of 50 feet (15 m), and a full-load draft of 12 feet (3.7 m). Her displacement is 647 long tons. Her gross tonnage calculated under international rules is 758, while her U.S. register tonnage is 97. Her hull is constructed of welded steel plates.

For propulsion, Lituya has two Caterpillar 3508 B diesel engines rated at 1000 hp. These drive two three-bladed fixed-pitch propellers which are 6 feet (1.8 m) in diameter. Electrical power aboard is provided by a Caterpillar 3304 generator which is rated at 105 kW. Her 200 hp bow thruster is powered by a Caterpillar 3406 C engine which can also be used as a back-up electrical generator. She cruises at 11.5 knots, at which speed she burns 55 gallons of diesel fuel per hour.

Lituya has an open vehicle deck with 300 feet (91 m) of lanes which can accommodate 15 standard-sized vehicles. The open vehicle deck saves money by reducing various regulatory requirements and allows for over-height vehicles, but users dislike having their cars covered in salt spray. She has a passenger capacity of 125. She is intended for day use only on her short route so there are no crew quarters or passenger staterooms. There is no food service aboard.

She normally sails with a crew of 5.

All Alaska Marine Highway ferries are named after Alaskan glaciers. Lituya is named for the Lituya Glacier near Lituya Bay. She received her name through an essay contest for Metlakatla grade-school children. Second-grader Josiah Milne won the contest for suggesting the name in 2003.

== Operating history ==
Lituya began making two roundtrips per day between Metlakatla and Ketchikan in the spring of 2005.

During the night of January 30, 2009, the ship came loose from its moorings in Metlakatla while unmanned. She drifted about a mile, running up on Scrub Island in Port Chester harbor. Winds at the time averaged 26 mph (42 km/h) with gusts to 80 mph (130 km/h); seas were 8 feet (2.4 m). Two tugs and USCGC Anthony Petit were dispatched to assist in refloating Lituya. The hull was intact but for a small leak in a forward void which the ship's pumps easily handled. The port keel cooler appeared to be leaking coolant. About 2,000 gallons of diesel fuel were spilled, likely from a tank vent when the ship listed while aground. The ship was towed to Ketchikan for repairs.

Metlakatla residents began working on a road to the north end of Annette Island as early as 1946 in order to reduce sailing times to Ketchikan. During the early 1990s they met with a number of state and federal authorities regarding the project. A critical connection was made with the Department of Defense which sought projects for its "Innovative Readiness Training Program". It saw the project as "Operation Alaskan Road", a real-world exercise for its engineers and mechanics that simulated the rough conditions of the Korean Peninsula. The state of Alaska was also interested in the project and commissioned a cost/benefit study of the road in 1995. This work resulted in a memorandum of agreement between multiple federal and state authorities and the Metlakatla Indian Community which was signed on May 29, 1997. Construction began during the summer of 1997 on the 14.5 mile Walden Point Road from Metlakatla in the south of Annette Island to Annette Bay in the north. The road took ten years to build and was dedicated in 2007. Over 12,000 military personnel worked on the road during its construction. Funding from the Department of Defense alone totaled $75 million.

The state of Alaska built a new $10 million ferry terminal at the end of the Walden Point Road. In July 2013 Lituya began using the new terminal, cutting travel time to Ketchikan in half. In January 2017 fare collection policies were changed. Established fares were doubled from Ketchikan to Annette Bay while the trip back was free. This allowed tickets to be sold only in the more-developed Ketchikan terminal, saving time and effort.

Lituya was diverted from her normal schedule in May and June 2020. The Inter-Island Ferry Authority's ship M/V Prince of Wales suffered a major propulsion system failure while her sister ship M/V Stikine was already in the shipyard for repairs. This left Prince of Wales Island without ferry service. Lituya made several runs on the Hollis - Ketchikan route before Stikine could be returned to service. In a similar manner, Inter-Island Ferry Authority ships have provided service to Annette Island when Lituya was under repair.

Lituya has been well-used and relatively economical over the years. In 2006, for example, she embarked 28,302 passengers and 7,554 vehicles. From 2007 to 2009 the average annual cost of operating Lituya was $1,569,000. Like all ships in the Alaska Marine Highway System, she is subsidized by the state of Alaska. A 2020 study found that Lituya comes closest to breaking even, but still requires an annual subsidy of $370,000.

In August 2020, Lituya was scheduled to complete two round-trips per day, five days per week. Each one-way sailing between Ketchikan and Annette Bay takes about 45 minutes.
