= AQC =

AQC may refer to:

- Adiabatic quantum computation, a quantum computing model that relies on the adiabatic theorem to do calculations
- Analytical quality control in laboratories
- AQC (airport), an airport in Klawock, Alaska
- Association Québécoise de Criminalistique [Canada]

== See also ==
- aqc, the ISO 639-3 code for the Archi language of the Caucasus
