= MV Stikine =

Ship built in 2006

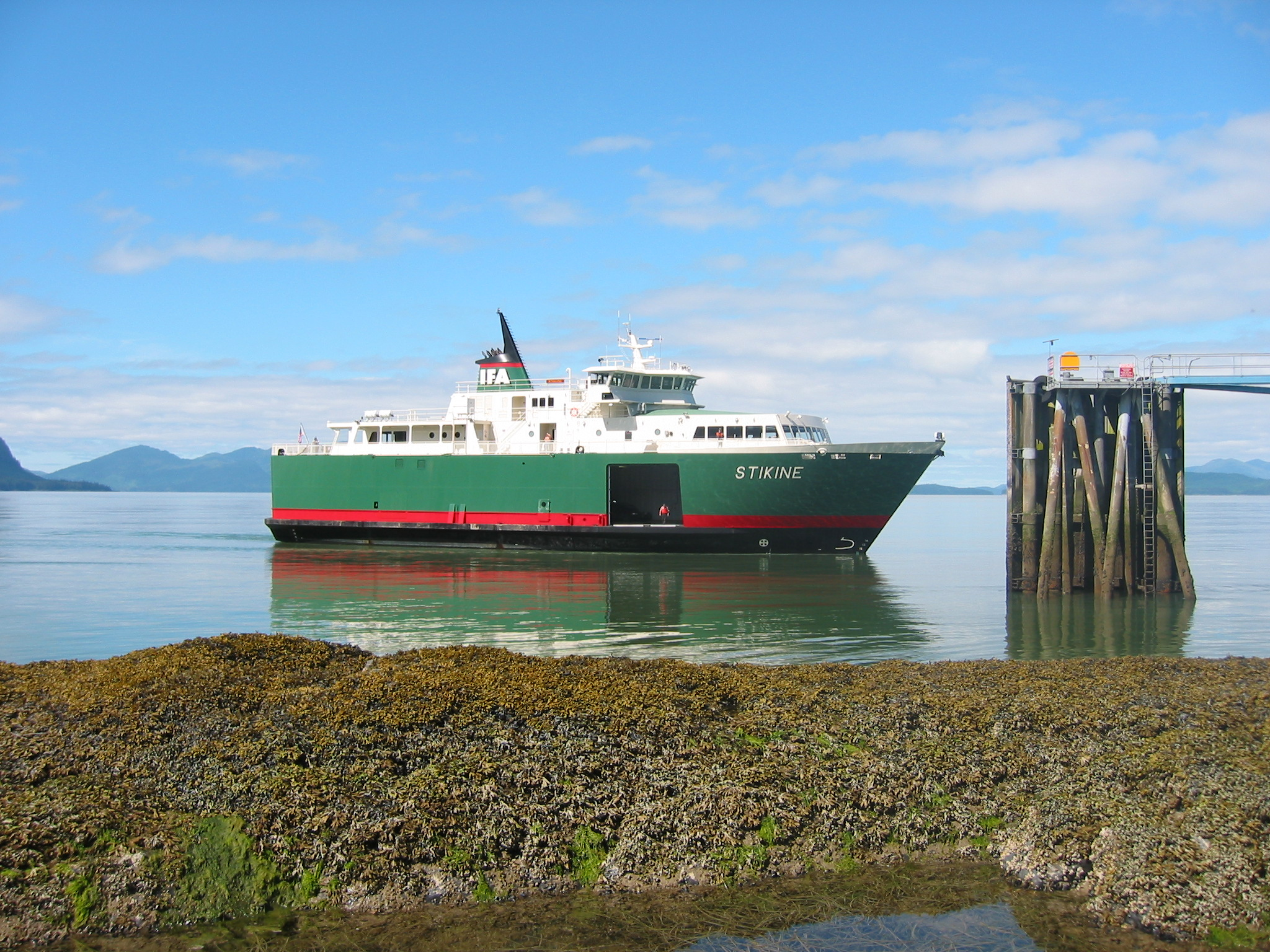
- The Stikine at Wrangell, Alaska

History

United States
- Name: Stikine
- Namesake: Stikine River
- Operator: Inter-Island Ferry Authority
- Route: Hollis–Ketchikan
- Builder: Dakota Creek Industries, Anacortes, Washington
- Cost: $16,940,984
- Launched: January 23, 2006
- Maiden voyage: May 18, 2006
- Home port: Hollis, Alaska
- Identification: IMO number: 9388431; MMSI number: 367089610; Callsign: WDC8583; Official number: 1179851
- Status: in active service

General characteristics
- Type: Roll-on/roll-off ferry
- Length: 198 ft (60 m)
- Beam: 51 ft (16 m)
- Decks: One vehicle deck; One passenger deck
- Ramps: starboard and aft vehicle loading
- Propulsion: 3,000 hp (2,237 kW)
- Speed: 15 knots (28 km/h; 17 mph)
- Capacity: 190 passengers; 30 vehicles
- Crew: 5

MV Stikine is an American ferry operated by the Inter-Island Ferry Authority. Her regular route is between Ketchikan and Hollis, in Southeast Alaska.

== Origin ==
In 1992 the state of Alaska passed the Municipal Port Authority Act which allowed cities and groups of cities to establish port authorities with powers to sell bonds to support local transportation-related operations. In early 1994 the Alaska Department of Transportation granted $50,000 to the city of Craig to study the potential of such an authority to provide ferry service to Prince of Wales Island. The Alaska Marine Highway System supported this study because it was losing money serving the island with intermittent stops by MV Aurora, and wanted to stop altogether. The residents of the island, on the other hand, wanted daily service and thought that it would stimulate business. In August 1994, the Craig City Council received this report outlining a two-ferry system with a southern route linking Hollis with Ketchikan, and a northern route connecting Prince of Wales Island with Wrangell, and Petersburg. The system would be run by a municipal port authority.

In 1997 six Southeast Alaska communities banded together to form the Inter-Island Ferry Authority. With the help of substantial federal and state investments, the Inter-Island Ferry Authority built MV Prince of Wales and launched service between Hollis and Ketchikan on January 13, 2002. After some early financial and operational challenges, the southern route became a success. Ridership was up sharply in 2003, and an operating profit was projected for fiscal year 2003/2004. With this successful experience, Inter-Island Ferry Authority was able to gain funding for a ship for the northern route, Stikine.

== Construction and characteristics ==
Stikine began as a twin of Prince of Wales. Her design incorporated improvements suggested by two years of operating experience, however, so Stikine was more capable than her sister ship from her beginning. Bids were solicited, and the winner was Dakota Creek Industries of Anacortes, Washington, which had built Prince of Wales. Contracts between Inter-Island Ferry Authority and Dakota Creek Industries were signed on December 13, 2004. The contract price for Stikine was $16,940,984. Her naval architect and owner's representative during the construction process was Guido Perla & Associates of Seattle, Washington.

Stikine was launched on January 23, 2006. She was christened by Nancy Murkowski, First Lady of Alaska. Her husband, Governor Frank Murkowski, was a speaker at the launch ceremonies.

Stikine is 197.5 feet (60.2 m) long with a beam of 53 feet (16 m), and a draft of 11 feet (3.4 m). Her gross tonnage is calculated as 2,334 and her net tonnage as 918. Her hull is constructed of welded steel plates.

The ship is certified to carry 190 passengers and 30 standard-sized cars. Her passenger amenities include a hot-food cafeteria, solarium, forward observation/recliner lounge, and children's play area. Since she is intended for day-use only, there are no staterooms for passengers or crew. The crew does have a break room, lockers, and a separate restroom.

Stikine cruises at 15 knots. Her propulsion is provided by two Caterpillar 3512 Diesel engines which generate 1,500 hp each. These in turn, drive two variable-pitch propellers. She has an Omnithruster HT400 bow thruster to improve maneuverability.

She normally sails with a crew of five.

Her namesake is the Stikine River, which reaches the sea near Wrangell, one of the stops on the northern route for which she was built.

== Operating history ==
Stikine made her maiden voyage on the northern route on May 18, 2006. She completed one round-trip per day between Coffman Cove and south Mitkoff Island, with a stop in Wrangell. Her sailing from Coffman Cove to Wrangell took about 2 hours and 45 minutes, and from Wrangell to Mitkoff Island about another hour. With an hour budgeted for loading and unloading in Wrangell, the trip from Coffman Cove to Mitkoff Island took about 4 hours and 45 minutes.. The fare from Coffman Cove to Mitkoff Island was $49 for an adult, and $7/foot for cars. Larger vehicles were more expensive. The northern route operated only four days a week so as not to require a second crew for Stikine. The route operated only in the summer when ferry traffic in Southeast Alaska peaked with tourist crossings.

During the winter, Inter-Island Ferry Authority made use of its two ships to maintain service on the southern route during maintenance periods. In early 2007, for example, Prince of Wales returned to Anacortes to receive some of the upgrades built in to Stikine from the start, including a more powerful bow thruster, a third generator, and enclosed bridge wings. Meanwhile, Stikine maintained the company's sailing schedule on the southern route between Hollis and Ketchikan.

The northern route could not sustain Stikine economically. During her first six weeks of operation in 2006, she embarked only 844 passengers and 199 vehicles. Inter-Island Ferry Authority experimented with various traffic-building promotions, without success. After sailing the northern route for the summers of 2006, 2007, and 2008, annual travel never exceeded 3,000 passengers, and 1,000 vehicles. The route was abandoned.

After the abandonment of the northern route, Stikine and Prince of Wales were both dedicated to the southern route, with the two ships filling in for each other when they had scheduled maintenance or an unexpected mechanical failure. Stikine was the primary vessel because of her slightly greater capacity, with Prince of Wales acting as a replacement boat. One round trip per day was scheduled. The trip takes three hours each way to cover the 36 miles between Hollis and Ketchikan. In 2020 a one-way fare for an adult was about $50 and for a 16-foot car about $200.

The Alaska Marine Highway System and the Inter-Island Ferry Authority provide each other with back-up capacity when their ships require maintenance. For example, MV Lituya was diverted from her normal Metlakatla–Ketchikan schedule in May and June 2020. Prince of Wales suffered a major propulsion system failure while Stikine was already in the shipyard for repairs. This left Prince of Wales Island without ferry service. Lituya made several runs on the Hollis–Ketchikan route before Stikine could be returned to service. In a similar manner, Inter-Island Ferry Authority ships have provided service to Annette Island when Lituya was under repair.
