= USCGC Anthony Petit =

Keeper-class coastal buoy tender of the United States Coast Guard

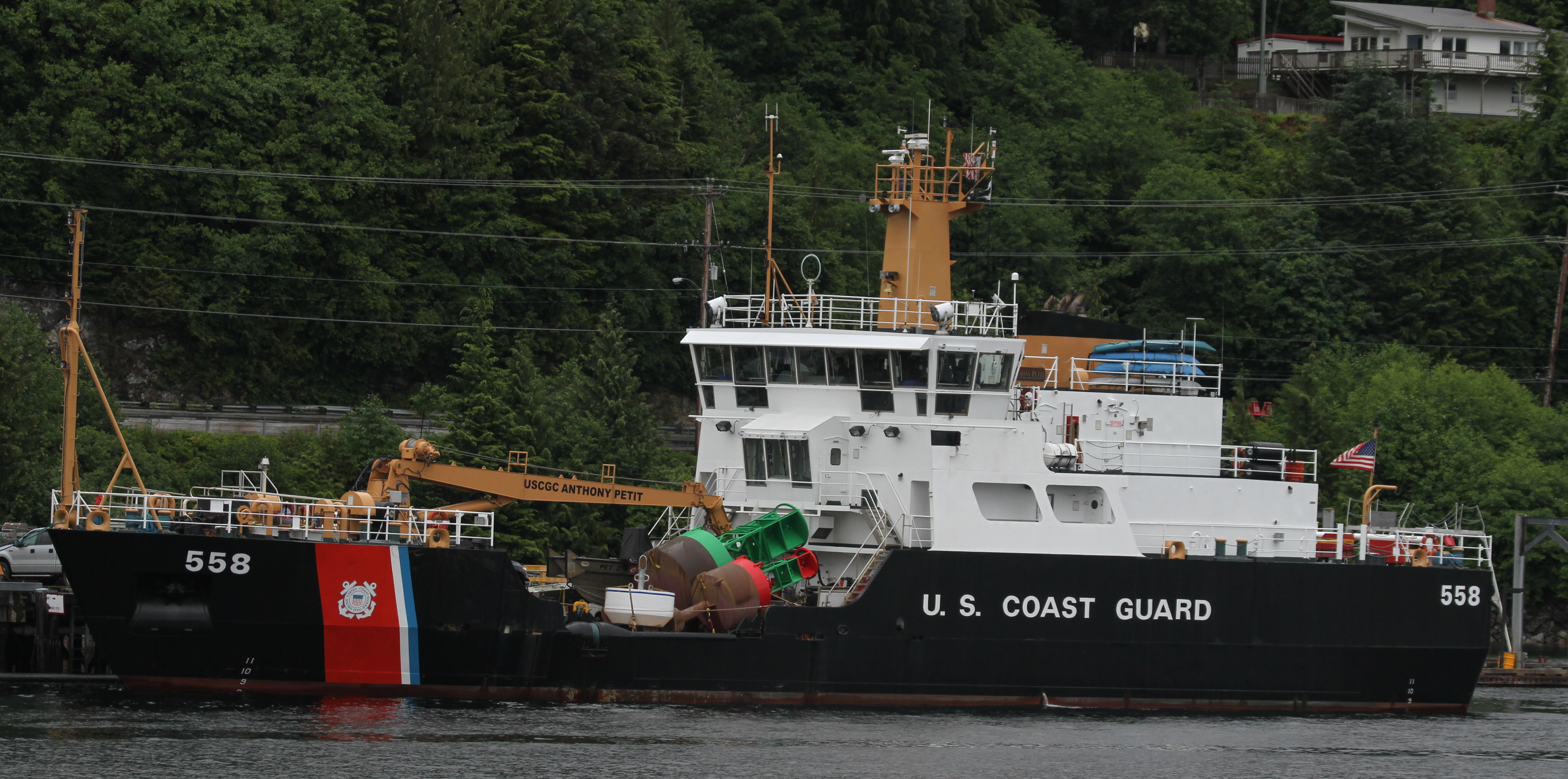
- USCGC Anthony Petit

History

United States
- Name: Anthony Petit
- Namesake: The keeper of the Scotch Cap lighthouse
- Operator: US Coast Guard
- Builder: Marinette Marine Corporation
- Launched: 30 January 1999
- Home port: Ketchikan, Alaska
- Identification: IMO number: 9177260; Call sign: NERW; MMSI number: 366969000
- Status: Active

General characteristics
- Type: Keeper-class buoy tender
- Displacement: 850 long tons (864 t) full load
- Length: 175 ft (53.3 m)
- Beam: 36 ft (11.0 m)
- Draft: 8 ft (2.4 m)
- Installed power: 2,000 hp (1,500 kW) sustained
- Propulsion: 2 × Caterpillar 3508 DITA Diesel engines; bow thruster, 500 hp (373 kW)
- Speed: 12 knots (22 km/h; 14 mph)
- Range: 2000 nautical miles at 10 kn
- Crew: 24 (2 Officers, 22 Enlisted)

USCGC Anthony Petit (WLM-558) is a Keeper-class coastal buoy tender of the United States Coast Guard. Launched in 1999, she has served her entire career maintaining navigational aids in Southeast Alaska. She is assigned to the Seventeenth Coast Guard District.

== Construction ==
Anthony Petit was built by Marinette Marine Corporation in Marinette, Wisconsin. She was the eighth of the fourteen Keeper-class vessels completed. On 22 June 1993 the Coast Guard awarded the contract for the Keeper class vessels in the form of a firm contract for the lead ship and options for thirteen more. In February 1997, it exercised options for the 5th through the 10th vessels, including Anthony Petit. The ship was launched on 30 January 1999, into the Menominee River. Speakers at the christening ceremony included Alaska Senator Frank Murkowski, and Coast Guard Commandant Admiral James Loy.

Her hull was built of welded steel plates. She is 175 feet (53 m) long, with a beam of 36 feet (11 m), and a full-load draft of 8 feet (2.4 m). Anthony Petit displaces 850 long tons fully loaded. Her gross register tonnage is 904, and her net register tonnage is 271. The top of the mast is 58.75 feet (17.91 m) above the waterline.

Rather than building the ship from the keel up as a single unit, Marinette Marine used a modular fabrication approach. Eight large modules, or "hull blocks" were built separately and then welded together.

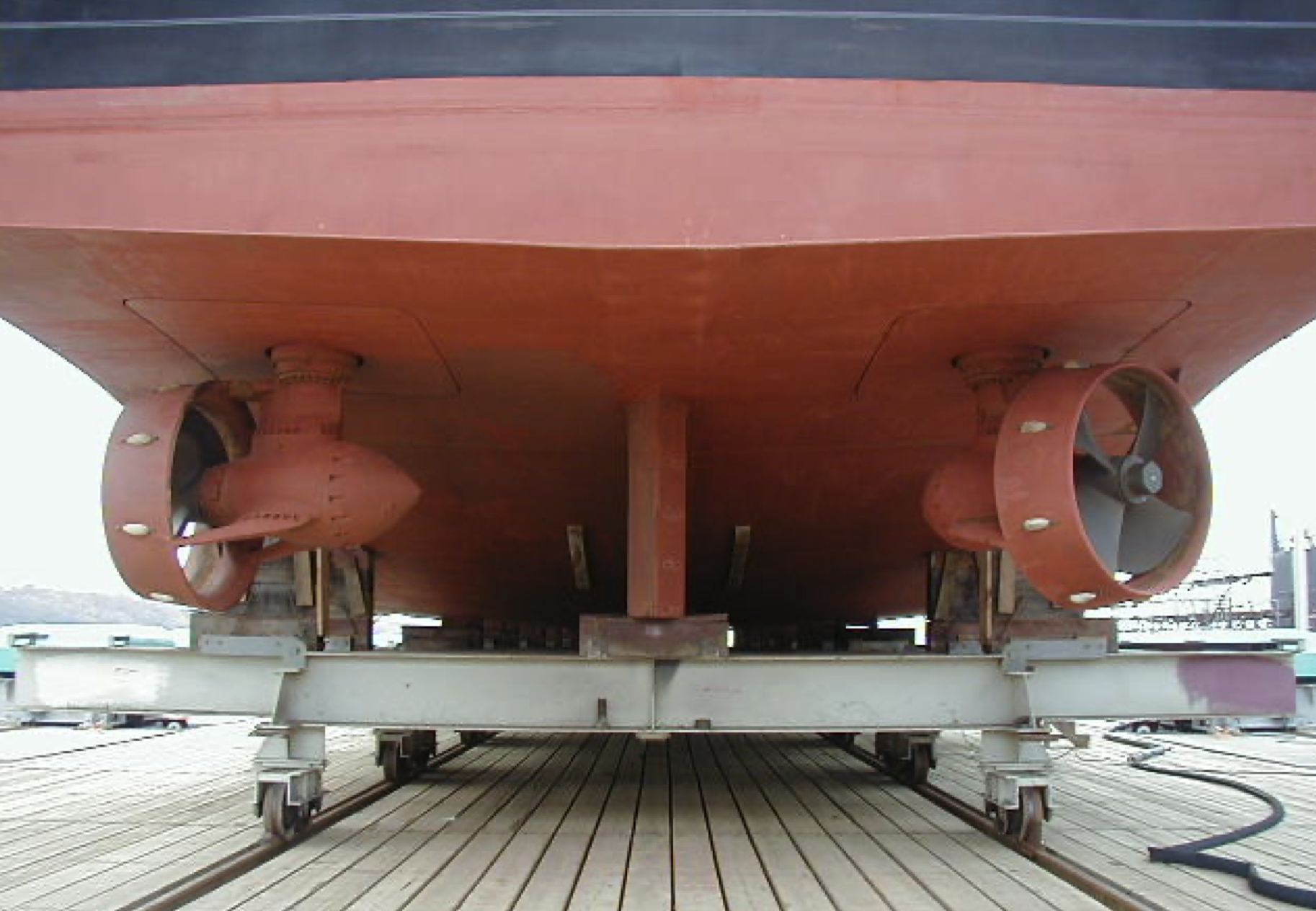
Z-drives on a Keeper-class ship

The ship has two Caterpillar 3508 DITA (direct-injection, turbocharged, aftercooled) 8-cylinder Diesel engines which produce 1000 horsepower each. These drive two Ulstein Z-drives. Keeper-class ships were the first Coast Guard cutters equipped with Z-drives, which markedly improved their maneuverability. The Z-drives have four-bladed propellers which are 57.1 inches (145 cm) in diameter and are equipped with Kort nozzles. They can be operated in "tiller mode" where the Z-drives turn in the same direction to steer the ship, or in "Z-conn mode" where the two Z-drives can turn in different directions to achieve specific maneuvering objectives. An implication of the Z-drives is that there is no reverse gear or rudder aboard Anthony Petit. In order to back the ship, the Z-drives are turned 180 degrees which drives the ship stern-first even though the propellers are spinning in the same direction as they do when the ship is moving forward. Her maximum speed is 12 knots. Her tanks can hold 16,385 gallons of diesel fuel which gives her an unrefueled range of 2,000 nautical miles at 10 knots.

She has a 500 horsepower bow thruster. The Z-drives and bow thruster can be linked in a Dynamic Positioning System. This gives Anthony Petit the ability to hold position in the water even in heavy currents, winds, and swells. This advanced capability is useful in bringing buoys aboard that can weigh more than 16,000 lbs.

Electrical power aboard is provided by three Caterpillar 3406 DITA generators which produce 285 Kw each. She also has a 210 Kw emergency generator, which is a Caterpillar 3406 DIT.

The buoy deck has 1,335 square feet (124.0 m^{2}) of working area. A crane with a boom 42 feet (13 m) long lifts buoys and their mooring anchors onto the deck. The crane can lift up to 20,000 pounds (9,100 kg).

The ships' fresh water tanks can hold 7,339 gallons. She has three ballast tanks that can be filled to maintain their trim, and tanks for oily waste water, sewage, gray water, new lubrication oil, and waste oil.

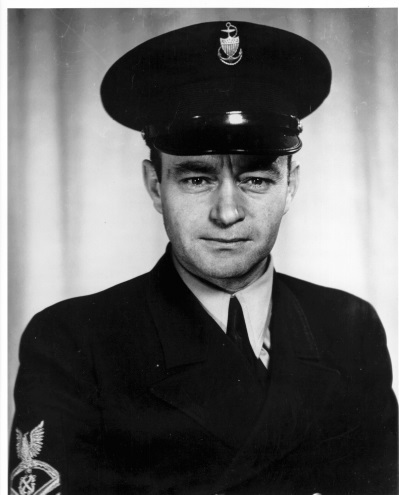
Chief Boatswain's Mate Anthony L. Petit

Accommodations were designed for mixed gender crews from the start. Crew size and composition has varied over the years. When she was commissioned in 1999, she had a crew of 23, commanded by a Chief Warrant Officer.

Anthony Petit, as all Keeper-class ships, has a strengthened "ice belt" along the waterline so that she can work on aids to navigation in ice-infested waters. Not only is the hull plating in the ice belt thicker than the rest of the hull, but framing members are closer together in areas that experience greater loads when working in ice. Higher grades of steel were used for hull plating in the ice belt to prevent cracking in cold temperatures. Her bow is sloped so that rather than smashing into ice, she ride up over it and break it with the weight of the ship. Anthony Petit is capable of breaking flat, 9-inch thick ice at 3 knots.

The ship carries a cutter boat on davits. She was originally equipped with a CB-M boat which was replaced in the mid-2010s with a CB-ATON-M boat. This was built by Metal Shark Aluminum Boats and was estimated to cost $210,000. The boat is 18 feet (5.5 m) long and are equipped with a Mercury Marine inboard/outboard diesel engine.

The ship's namesake is U.S. Coast Guard Chief Boatswain's Mate Anthony Petit, the keeper of the Scotch Cap lighthouse on the west end of Unimak Island in the Aleutians. Petit and four other members of his crew were killed in a tsunami which destroyed the lighthouse on April 1, 1946.

== Operational history ==
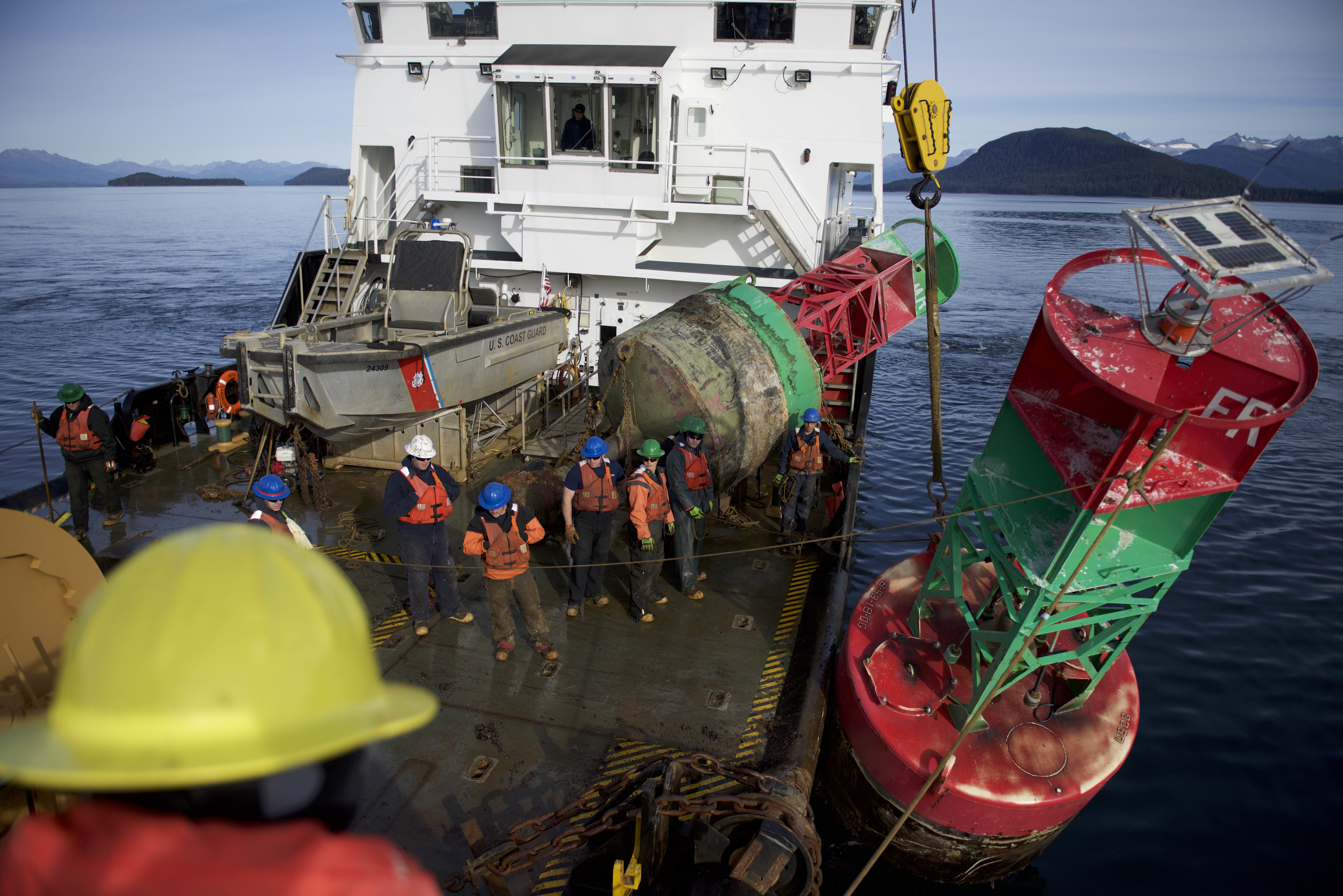
Buoy maintenance on Anthony Petit in 2018

After her launch and sea trials, Anthony Petit sailed down the Great Lakes, the Saint Lawrence Seaway, and through the Panama Canal to reach Ketchikan, Alaska, her homeport for her entire career. She arrived in January 2000. The ship is stationed at Coast Guard Base Ketchikan. She replaced USCGC Planetree at this station. Her primary mission is maintaining 274 fixed and floating aids to navigation in Southeast Alaska.

The ship has also performed other Coast Guard missions. Anthony Petit participated in search and rescue activities as with the charter boat Fishin' Fool in 2002, fishing vessel Yvonne Denise in 2005, the ferry Lituya in 2009, and the fishing vessel Tsimshian Lady in 2017.

Anthony Petit has trained extensively on oil spill containment. She has participated in several joint United States-Canada exercises to prepare for a possible spill in the Dixon Entrance area. She has deployed the vessel of opportunity skimming system (VOSS) several times in training.
