= Lituya Mountain =

Mountain in the Fairweather Range, Alaska, USA

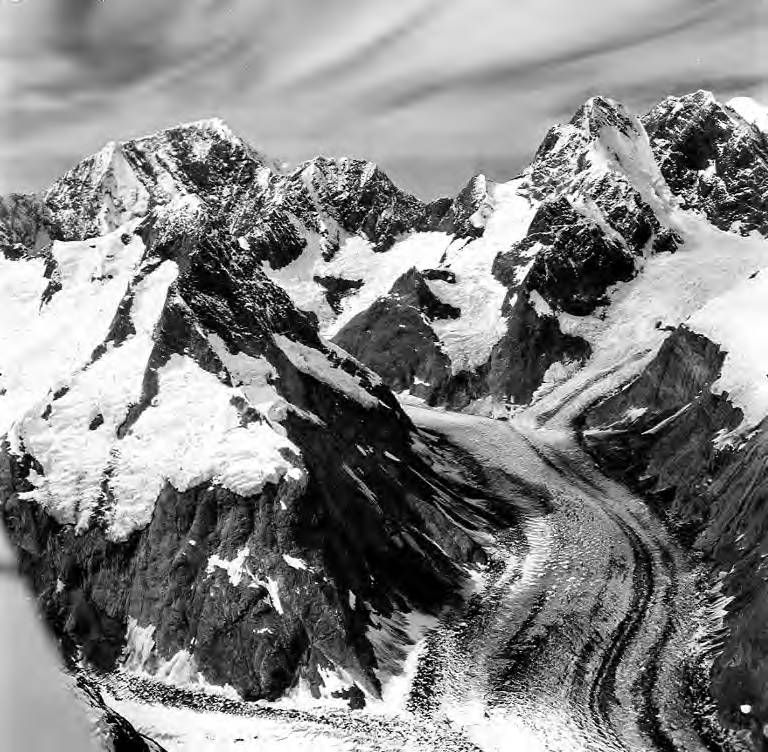
- Lituya (upper left) and Mt. Salisbury (right)

Highest point
- Elevation: 11,924 ft (3,634 m)
- Prominence: 3,624 ft (1,105 m)
- Coordinates: 58°48′19″N 137°26′12″W

Geography
- Location within Alaska
- Interactive map of Lituya Mountain
- Location: Glacier Bay National Park; Hoonah-Angoon Census Area, Alaska
- Parent range: Fairweather Range
- Topo map: USGS Mount Fairweather D-5

Climbing
- First ascent: 1962 by S. Arighi, D. Bohn, D. Chappelear, H. Flachsmann, A. Maki, M. Mushkin and L. Nielsen
- Easiest route: Glacier / snow / ice climb

Lituya Mountain is a peak in the Fairweather Range of Alaska, United States, south of Mount Fairweather. Its eastern slopes feed a branch of the Johns Hopkins Glacier, which flows into Glacier Bay. On its western side is a large cirque, shared with Mount Fairweather, Mount Quincy Adams, and Mount Salisbury, which heads the Fairweather Glacier; this flows almost to the Pacific coast at Cape Fairweather. The Lituya Glacier flows from the south side of the mountain into Lituya Bay on the Pacific coast.

Though not exceptional in terms of absolute elevation, Lituya Mountain does possess great vertical relief over local terrain. For example, the south side of the mountain drops 8,000 feet (2,400 m) to the Lituya Glacier in approximately 3 miles (5 km), and the southeast side drops the same distance in just over 2 miles (3 km).

Lituya Mountain is not often climbed, partly due to its proximity to the higher and better-known Mount Fairweather, and partly due to difficult access and bad weather in the Fairweather Range.

The Lituya name was published in 1852 as G(ora) L'tua, meaning "Lituya Mountain" in Russian by Mikhail Tebenkov of the Imperial Russian Navy.

== History ==
=== 1958 earthquake ===
On July 9, 1958, an earthquake along the Fairweather Fault loosened about 40 million cubic yards of rock above Lituya Bay. The impact of this enormous volume of rock falling from approximately 3,300 feet (1,000 m) produced locally the largest recorded tsunami (an estimated 1,700 feet (520 m) high) and devastated the entire bay. The wave destroyed lands and trees up to 1,719 feet (524 m) above sea level around the bay. The edge located to the west of the Gilbert Inlet at the bottom of the Lituya Glacier (point opposite to the rock impact in the water) was the most affected place.

=== 2012 landslide ===
On June 11, 2012, there was another enormous landslide at the base of the mountain. At 5.5 miles (8.9 km) long and 0.5 miles (0.80 km) wide, now spread across the Johns Hopkins Glacier, it is possibly the largest recorded in North America. Other than registering as a magnitude 3.4 quake, it went unnoticed for a month until discovered by a pilot flying over the glacier.

== See also ==
- Barry Arm landslide – another major landslide in Alaska
