= Klawock Seaplane Base =

- IATA: none; ICAO: PAQC; FAA LID: AQC

Summary
- Airport type: Public
- Owner/Operator: City of Klawock
- Serves: Klawock, Alaska
- Elevation AMSL: 0 ft (0 m)
- Coordinates: 55°33′17″N 133°06′06″W

Map
- Location of airport in Alaska

Runways
| Direction | Length | | Surface |
| Direction | ft | m | Surface |
|---|---|---|---|
| NW/SE | 5,000 | 1,524 | Water |
- Source: Federal Aviation Administration

Klawock Seaplane Base (ICAO: PAQC, FAA LID: AQC) is a public use seaplane base owned by and located in Klawock, a city in the Prince of Wales-Hyder Census Area of the U.S. state of Alaska. It is included in the National Plan of Integrated Airport Systems for 2011–2015, which categorized it as a general aviation facility.

== Facilities ==
Klawock Seaplane Base has one runway designated NW/SE with a water surface measuring 5,000 by 1,000 feet (1,524 x 305 m).

== Airlines and non-stop destinations ==
No airlines currently have scheduled service to the Klawock Seaplane Base.

== See also ==
- Klawock Airport (IATA: KLW, ICAO: PAKW, FAA: AKW) located at 55°34′45″N 133°04′34″W
