= USCGC Planetree =

USCGC Treatment

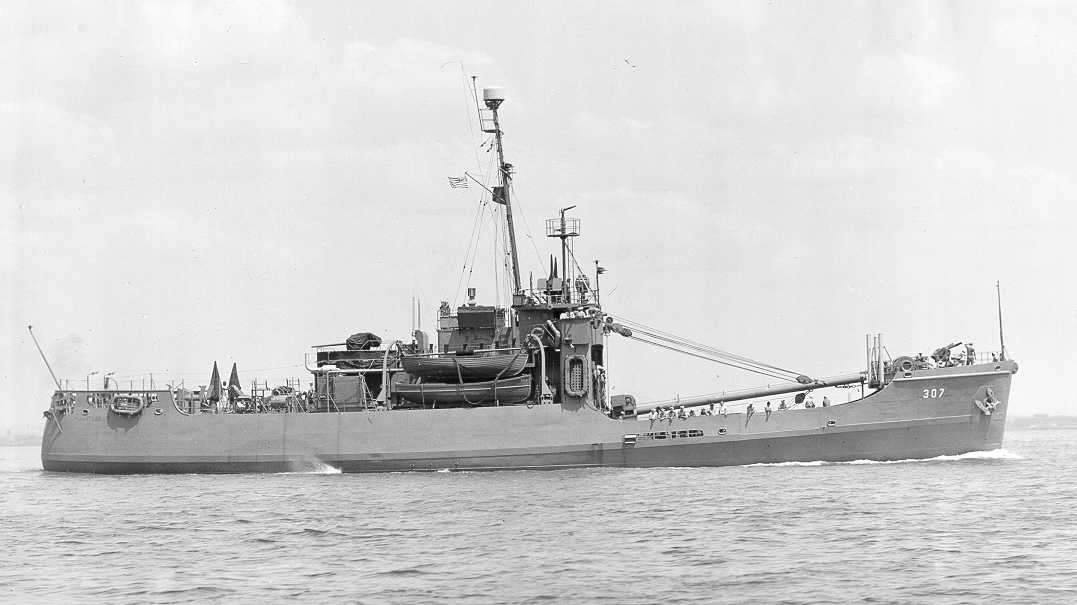
- USCGC Planetree in World War II

History

United States
- Builder: Marine Ironworks & Shipbuilding Corporation, Duluth, Minnesota
- Cost: $872,876
- Laid down: December 4, 1942
- Launched: March 20, 1943
- Commissioned: November 4, 1943
- Decommissioned: March 19, 1999
- Identification: Signal letters NRPY
- Fate: Scrapped in 2019

General characteristics as built in 1943
- Class & type: Mesquite
- Displacement: 935 tons
- Length: 180 ft (55 m)
- Beam: 37 ft (11 m)
- Draft: 12 feet (3.7 m)
- Propulsion: 2 × Cooper-Bessemer GN8 diesel engines
- Speed: 13 kn (24 km/h; 15 mph)
- Range: 8,000 nmi (15,000 km; 9,200 mi) at 13 kn (24 km/h; 15 mph)
- Complement: 6 officers and 74 enlisted
- Armament: 2 x 20 mm guns, 3-inch gun, and depth charges.

USCGC Planetree (WAGL/WLB-307) was a Mesquite-class seagoing buoy tender operated by the United States Coast Guard. She served during World War II, the Korean War, and the Vietnam War, as well as in a variety of domestic missions.

== Construction and characteristics ==
Planetree was built at the Marine Ironworks and Shipbuilding Company yard in Duluth, Minnesota. Her keel was laid down on December 4, 1942. The ship was launched on March 20, 1943. Her original cost was $872,876.

Her hull was constructed of welded steel plates framed with steel I-beams. As originally built, Planetree was 180 feet (55 m) long, with a beam of 37 feet (11 m), and a draft of 12 feet (3.7 m). Her displacement was 935 tons. While her overall dimensions remained the same over her career, the addition of new equipment raised her displacement to 1,025 tons by the end of her Coast Guard service.

She was designed to perform light ice-breaking. Her hull was reinforced with an "ice belt" of thicker steel around her waterline to protect it from punctures. Similarly, her bow was reinforced and shaped to ride over ice in order to crush it with the weight of the ship.

USCGC Planetree as she appeared at the end of her career

Planetree had a single 8.5 feet (2.6 m) stainless-steel five-blade propeller driven by a diesel-electric propulsion system. Two Cooper-Bessemer GND-8 4-cycle 8-cylinder Diesel engines produced 700 horsepower each. They provided power to two Westinghouse generators. The electricity from the generators ran a 1200-horsepower Westinghouse electric motor which turned the propeller.

She had a single cargo boom which had the ability to lift 20 tons onto her buoy deck.

The ship's fuel tanks had a capacity of approximately 28,875 US gallons (109,300 L). Planetree's unrefueled range was 8,000 nautical miles (15,000 km) at 13 knots, 12,000 nautical miles (22,000 km) at 12 knots, and 17,000 nautical miles (31,000 km) at 8.3 knots. Her potable water tanks had a capacity of 30,499 US gallons (115,450 L). Considering dry storage capacity and other factors, her at-sea endurance was 21 days.

Her wartime complement was 6 officers and 74 enlisted men. By 1964 this was reduced to 5 officers, 2 warrant officers, and 42 enlisted personnel.

Planetree was armed with a 3"/50 caliber gun mounted behind the pilot house. She also had two 20mm guns, one mounted on top of the wheelhouse and one on the aft deck. Two racks of depth charges were also mounted on the aft deck. All of this armament was removed in 1966 leaving Planetree with only small arms for law enforcement actions.

At the time of construction, Planetree was designated WAGL, an auxiliary vessel, lighthouse tender. The designation was system was changed in 1965, and she was redesignated WLB, an oceangoing buoy tender. Her namesake is the plane tree, a genus of trees which includes sycamores.

== Great Lakes service ==
Planetree was commissioned on November 4, 1943, and began her career in the Great Lakes. In early December 1943 she was icebreaking in Lake Superior to keep the port of Ashland, Wisconsin open for iron ore shipments. On December 10, 1943, the Canadian steamship Sarnian went aground off Point Isabella on the Keweenaw Peninsula during a storm. Covered in ice and pounded by high seas, her hull plates cracked, and she was abandoned three days later. Her crew of 22 was rescued by Planetree.

Planetree spent the winter of 1943–1944 icebreaking in the Great Lakes. She was the first vessel of the season to reach Sault Ste. Marie by breaking ice in the Saint Mary's River in March 1944.

== Pacific service ==
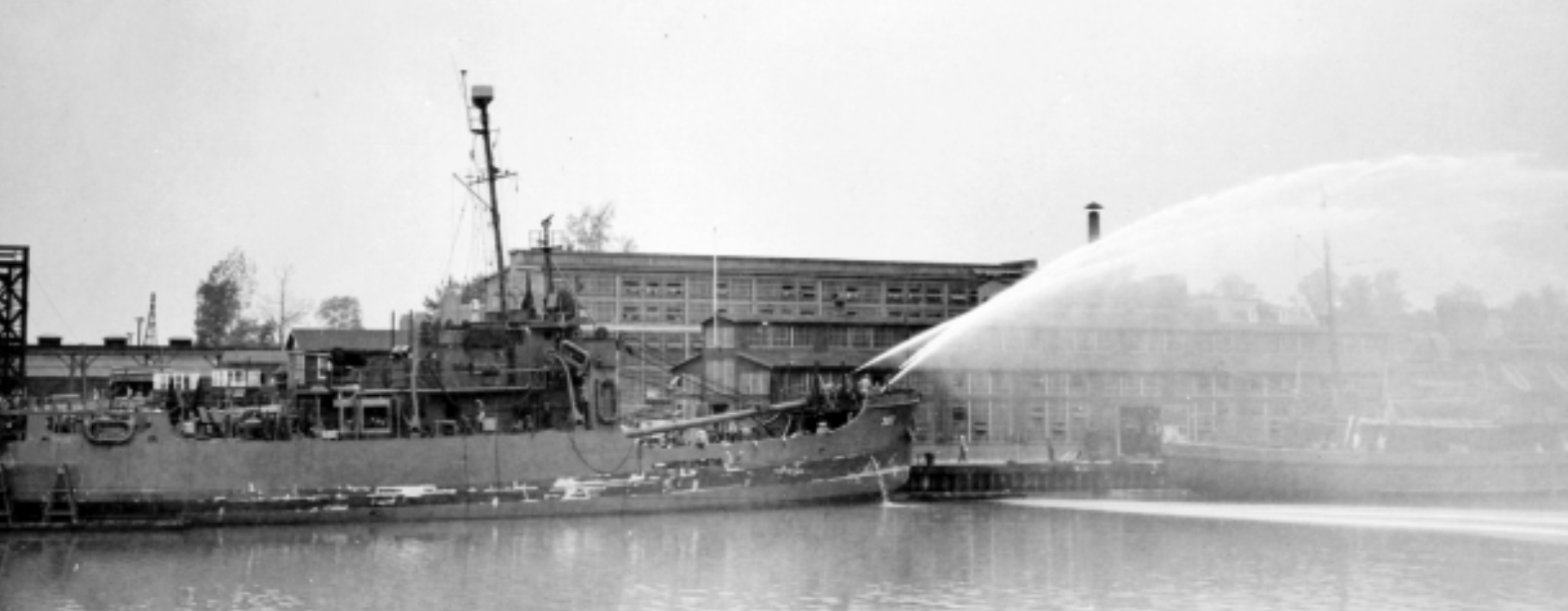
Planetree testing firefighting equipment at the Coast Guard Yard in June 1944

In June 1944 Planetree was assigned to a new homeport, Honolulu, Hawaii. During her transit from the Great Lakes she stopped at the Coast Guard Yard in Curtis Bay, Maryland. Tenders sailing for war zones were equipped with extra firefighting pumps, welding equipment, and diving gear. Once she reached Hawaii, one of her tasks was to deliver updated LORAN equipment to remote stations at Baker, Gardner, and Atafu Islands, which she accomplished in 1945.

The end of World War II in 1945 created intense pressure from conscripted members of the armed forces and their families for rapid demobilization. The Coast Guard lost so many sailors that it was forced to decommission several ships for lack of crews to sail them. Planetree was decommissioned in March 1947 and held in reserve at the Pearl Harbor Naval Shipyard. On September 1, 1949 Planetree was recommissioned and assigned to Guam. She was responsible for maintaining aids to navigation across a swathe to the Pacific from Okinawa to Eniwetok to Saipan. She also supplied remote bases. For example, on September 23, 1954, she arrived at Angaur, an island in Palau, towing a barge with about 8,000 gallons of diesel fuel for the LORAN station there.

In October 1954 she was reassigned to Honolulu. Her primary mission was to maintain aids to navigation, including LORAN stations, throughout the central Pacific. Due to the vast distances involved, these cruises were long. They took advantage of the ship's at-sea endurance. During February and March 1960, Planetree spent seven weeks repairing aids to navigation on Samoa, and Swains, Baker, Jarvis, Howland, and Enderbury Islands. In August 1960 she was sent on a four-week cruise to Midway and Johnston Islands, and Samoa to maintain aids to navigation. Planetree cruised the western Pacific on a five-month trip maintaining buoys in 1965. She also worked in the Hawaiian Islands. When a May 1960 tsunami displaced the harbor buoys at Hilo, Planetree was on the spot to reset them.

Planetree was tasked with a number of search and rescue missions while stationed in Honolulu. For example, in August 1959 she towed the disabled schooner Diablo and her crew of ten 675 miles back to Honolulu. She rescued the 17-man crew of the Japanese fishing vessel Koryo Maru II which had gone aground on Minto Reef in the Caroline Islands in 1961. The sloop Rampage, participating in the 1967 Transpacific Yacht Race, lost her rudder and was towed to port by Planetree.

Planetree had a brief tour in the Korean War zone, arriving on May 15, 1954. When she departed on July 27, 1954, she was the last Coast Guard cutter to leave theater of operations. She earned the Korean service medal for her efforts.

In July 1958 crew from Planetree arrested pacifist and nuclear activist Earle L. Reynolds 65 miles inside a restricted area in the Pacific Proving Grounds. He was protesting the Hardtack I series of hydrogen bomb tests. Planetree escorted his sailboat to Kwajalein.

In 1966 the Republic of Vietnam had only a single buoy tender. It was not adequate to maintain and improve navigational aids needed by the growing US shipping along the South Vietnamese coast. In particular, U.S. commanders wanted a series of petroleum off-loading buoys to support the movement of fuel ashore from tankers. They requested assistance placing these buoys and on April 24, 1966 Plantree became the first Coast Guard buoy tender to enter the Vietnam theater of operations. She set 16 off-loading buoys in 4 ports. Other requests for aids to navigation resulted in the Coast Guard deploying four buoy tenders, including Planetree, on short rotations during the Vietnam war. During her 1967 Vietnam deployment, Planetree set ship anchorage and mooring buoys off Da Nang and Chu Lai. Among the unique challenges faced in the war zone was that aids to navigation were used for target practice by all sides in the conflict. Batteries for lighted buoys were stolen by all sides for use in cars and other applications. Whenever any of the Coast Guard buoy tenders were deployed to the theater they sailed with Vietnamese lighthouse service personnel aboard. The training they received was deemed sufficient to turn over responsibility for maintaining their own aids to navigation in December 1972, but by then the regime was falling. The last Coast Guard buoy tender left Vietnamese waters in the spring of 1973 as part of the general withdrawal of U.S. forces. Planetree earned the Vietnam service award.

== Alaska service ==
Planetree was given a refit in 1974. She received an "austere" renovation, the less comprehensive of the two buoy tender service life extension programs the Coast Guard implemented at that time. This refit was expected to extend the ship's life by 8 to 10 years. Crew quarters were improved and modernized, and a new crew lounge was added. The climate control system was modernized, and the main engines and electrical switchboards were overhauled. New 100 kilowatt generators were installed. After the renovation, in August 1974, Planetree was reassigned to Juneau, Alaska. Her primary mission remained the maintenance of aids to navigation. One unusual aspect of this service is that she was responsible for supplying the last staffed lighthouse in Alaska, Five Finger Island.

Planetree sailed from Alaska to Hawaii several times during her career to join training exercises. On one trip, in January 1983, she encountered a storm which produced 100-mile per hour gusts and waves 55 feet high. Three small holes opened in the ship's hull causing a 30 to 50 gallon per hour leak. The application off quick-drying cement as temporary patches cut the leaks down to 3 to 5 gallons per hour, which the ship's pumps handled easily. Planetree hove to until the weather moderated, reducing her speed to just the minimum required to allow her rudder to be effective in steering the ship. Even at this low speed, the ship began to leak propeller shaft lubricant which threatened her ability to continue steering. USCGC Douglas Munro responded to Planetree bringing additional lubricant, and the ship made port as the weather moderated.

In September 1984 Planetree was tending a buoy about 5 miles west of Gustavus, Alaska. She struck a submerged object which tore a hole in her hull 3 feet long and eight inches wide. Her main hold flooded to ten feet deep. She sought shelter at Bartlett Cove in Glacier Bay National Park where commercial divers installed a temporary patch.

In 1985 Planetree was transferred to Ketchikan, replacing USCGC Laurel. In her new homeport she was responsible for 254 aids to navigation between Dixon Entrance and Juneau.

On April 6, 1989 Planetree was directed to sail for Prince William Sound to assist in the Coast Guard response to the Exxon Valdez oil spill. Planetree and USCGC Yocona attempted to corral floating oil near Seward with floating boom.

At 10:11 pm on January 25, 1990 Planetree ran aground at Deception Point in the southern part of Wrangell Narrows. There were no injuries and the ship was promptly refloated, but her hull was pierced and began to flood. USCGC Firebush, USCGC Elderberry, and USCGC Anacapa responded and brought emergency pumps and divers. The divers found a 1' x 2' hole, a 6" x 1" crack and a 5-foot dent on Planetree's port side. The pumps prevailed, removing 3.2 million gallons of water from the ship's hold. Planetree ultimately made it to drydock in Ketchikan under her own power.

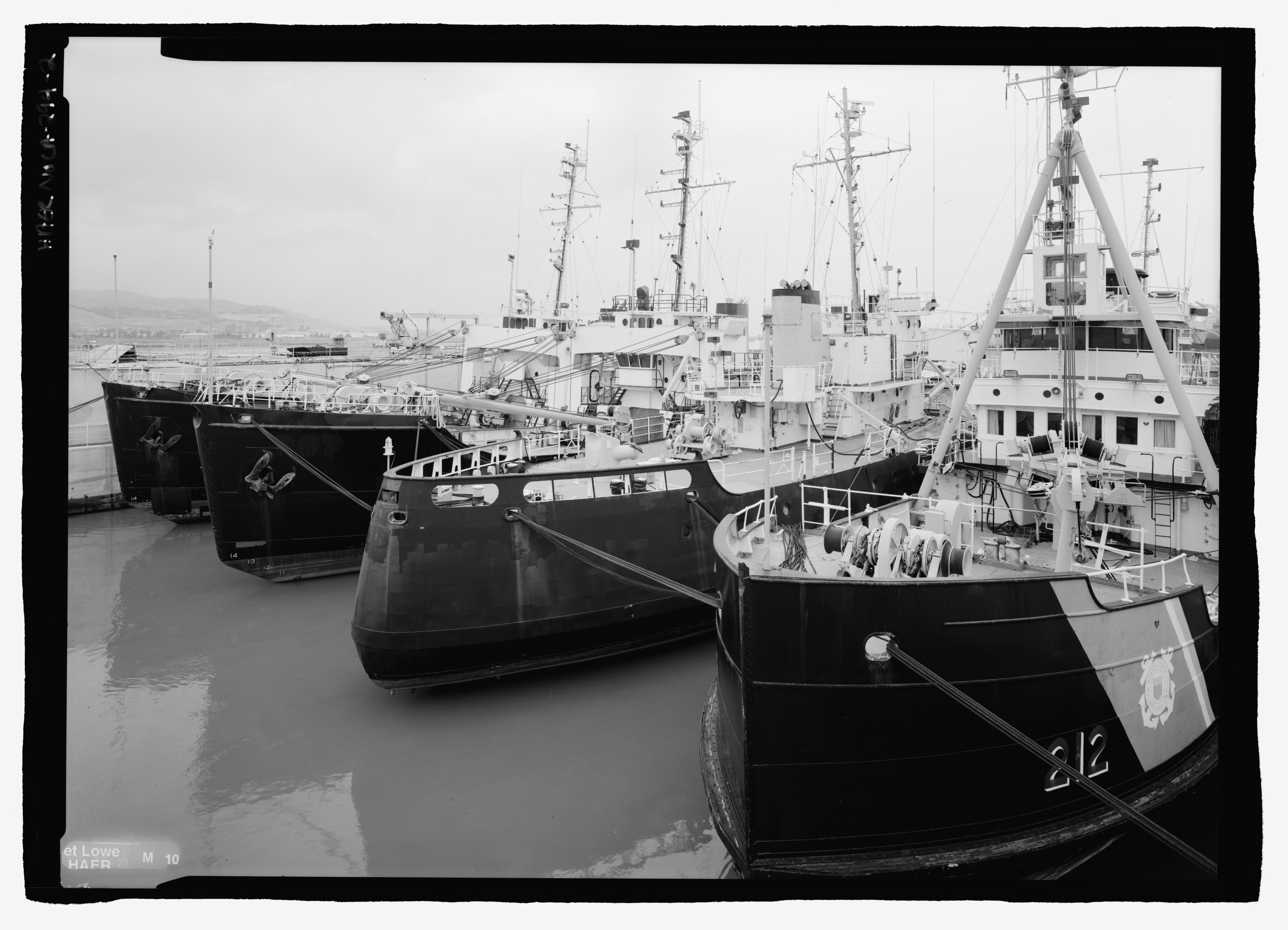
USCGC Planetree (second from left) rafted in reserve fleet, Suisun Bay, California

Planetree was decommissioned in Ketchikan on March 19, 1999. During her career she earned several honors including the Coast Guard Unit Commendation, two Meritorious Unit Commendations, and eight Coast Guard E Ribbons. She was replaced in Ketchikan by USCGC Anthony Petit.

== Retirement ==
After decommissioning, Planetree was placed in the ready reserve fleet and moored with other mothballed ships at Suisun Bay, California. Several efforts were made to donate the ship to a worthy non-profit organization. The Coast Guard and Maritime Transportation Act of 2004 sought to donate Planetree to the Jewish Life museum in Sherman Oaks, California. In 2005 Congress acted to give Plaintree to CAS Foundation, Inc. of Indiana. In 2009 the Senate took action to donate the vessel to The Anchor Program in Richmond, California. None of these donations happened. In 2018 the Maritime Administration contracted with All Star Metals of Brownsville, Texas to recycle Planetree and USCGC Iris. They were drydocked at Mare Island to clean their bottoms and repair their hulls sufficiently for them to reach Texas. The drydock contract was for $268,000. The two ships were towed to Brownsville where they arrived on January 28, 2019. It was reported that the cost of the recycling was $1,359,400.
