= MV Prince of Wales =

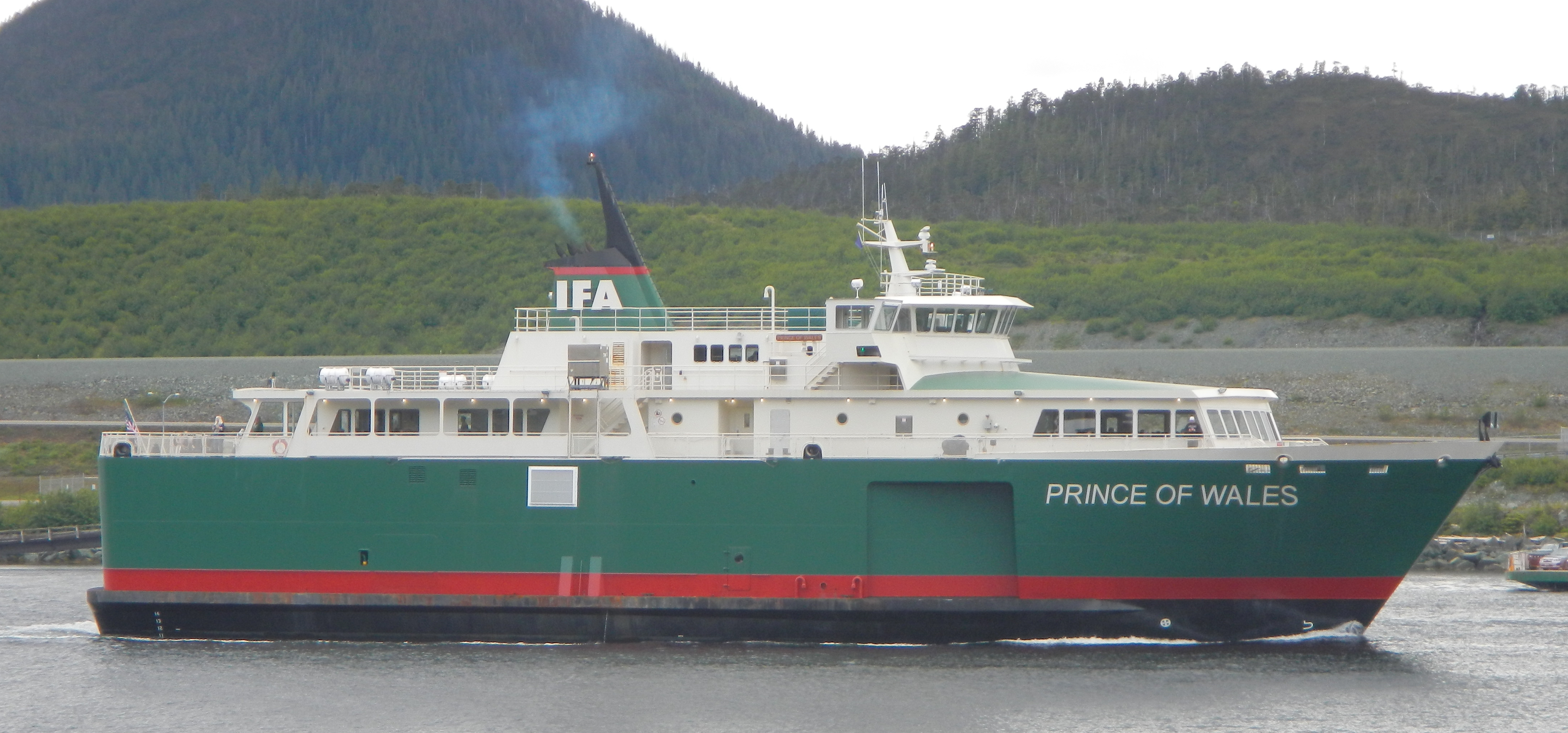
- MV Prince of Wales in Ketchikan

History

United States
- Name: Prince of Wales
- Namesake: Prince of Wales Island
- Operator: Inter-Island Ferry Authority
- Route: Hollis – Ketchikan
- Builder: Dakota Creek Industries, Anacortes, Washington
- Maiden voyage: January 13, 2002
- Home port: Hollis, Alaska
- Identification: IMO number: 8968351; Official Number 1118890; MMSI number: 369062000; Callsign: WDA6378
- Status: in active service

General characteristics
- Type: Roll-on/roll-off ferry
- Tonnage: 2,309 GT; 1,083 NT
- Length: 198 ft (60 m)
- Beam: 52.8 ft (16.1 m)
- Decks: One vehicle deck; One passenger deck
- Ramps: Aft and starboard vehicle loading
- Propulsion: 3,000 hp (2,237 kW)
- Speed: 15 knots (28 km/h; 17 mph)
- Capacity: 160 passengers; 30 vehicles
- Crew: 5

MV Prince of Wales is a ferry operated by the Inter-Island Ferry Authority. She serves as a replacement for her sister ship, MV Stikine, when she is out of service for maintenance. Her route is from Ketchikan to Hollis in Southeast Alaska.

== Origin ==
In 1992 the state of Alaska passed the Municipal Port Authority Act which allows cities and groups of cities to establish port authorities with powers to sell bonds to support local transportation-related operations. In early 1994 the Alaska Department of Transportation granted $50,000 to the city of Craig to study the potential of such an authority to provide ferry service to Prince of Wales Island. The Alaska Marine Highway System supported this study because it was losing money serving the island with intermittent stops by MV Aurora, and wanted to stop altogether. The residents of the island, on the other hand, wanted daily service and thought that it would stimulate business. In August 1994, the Craig City Council received this report outlining a two-ferry system with a southern route linking Hollis with Ketchikan, and a northern route connecting Prince of Wales Island with Wrangell, and Petersburg. The system would be run by a municipal port authority.

In 1997 six Southeast Alaska communities banded together to form the Inter-Island Ferry Authority. With the help of Alaska's congressional delegation, the authority received a grant of $12.6 million from the Federal Transit Administration, contingent on local matching funding. The state of Alaska declined to support the grant with the local matching funds required, so they were provided by a $200,000 loan from the city of Wrangell, and $1.9 million in municipal bonds backed by a loan guarantee from the Ketchikan Gateway Borough. This initial funding launched the agency and paid for Prince of Wales.

== Construction and characteristics ==
Prince of Wales was designed by the Elliott Bay Design Group of Seattle, Washington. Based on this design, Inter-Island Ferry Authority requested bids for the construction of its first ship with an option to purchase the second ship in its plan. It received five proposals by the deadline of September 25, 2000. Dakota Creek Industries of Anacortes, Washington won with the low bid of $12.2 million on the first ship. Sea trials on Prince of Wales began in early November 2001.

Prince of Wales is 197.5 feet (60.2 m) long with a beam of 52.8 feet (16.1 m), and a draft of 11 feet (3.4 m). Her gross tonnage is calculated as 2,309 and her net tonnage as 1,083. Her hull is constructed of welded steel plates.

Prince of Wales cruises at 15 knots (28 km/h; 17 mph). Her propulsion is provided by two Caterpillar 3512B diesel engines which generate 1,500 horsepower (1,100 kW) each. These in turn, drive two 72 inches (1.8 m) four-bladed variable-pitch propellers. She has an Omnithruster HT400 bow thruster to improve maneuverability.

The ship is certified to carry 160 passengers and 30 standard-sized cars. Her passenger amenities include a hot-food cafeteria, solarium, forward observation/recliner lounge, and children's play area. Since she is intended for day-use only, there are no staterooms for passengers or crew. The crew does have a break room, lockers, and a separate restroom. She normally sails with a crew of five. Her namesake is Prince of Wales Island, where she is home-ported.

== Operating history ==
Prince of Wales arrived in Ketchikan for the first time on December 29, 2001. Her maiden voyage between Hollis and Ketchikan occurred on January 13, 2002. Later that month she was taken out of service for several days for lack of spare filters for her variable-pitch propeller system. Another early difficulty was that the restaurant concessionaire aboard found that its operations were not economic and broke its 5-year contract after nine months. The restaurant was replaced with the current cafeteria service.

Inter-Island Ferry Authority's second ship MV Stikine was launched in 2006 to support the northern route during summers. During the winter, the two ships took turns maintaining service on the southern route during maintenance periods. In early 2007, for example, Prince of Wales returned to Anacortes to receive some of the upgrades built in to Stikine from the start, including a more powerful bow thruster, a third generator, and enclosed bridge wings. Meanwhile, Stikine maintained the company's sailing schedule on the southern route between Hollis and Ketchikan.

The northern route could not sustain Stikine economically, so after the summer of 2008 both ships were used on the southern route. As Stikine had slightly greater capacity, she became the primary ferry on the Hollis–Ketchikan route, with Prince of Wales becoming a reserve for when Stikine broke down or was scheduled for routine maintenance. She was an expensive back-up plan, and cost the authority about $200,000 a year in moorage, insurance, and maintenance. In 2012 Inter-Island Ferry Authority considered selling the ship to save money, but this was never executed.

In May and June 2020 Prince of Wales proved an inadequate back-up for Stikine. She suffered a major propulsion system failure while Stikine was already in the shipyard for repairs. This left Prince of Wales Island without ferry service. To assist island residents MV Lituya, operated by the Alaska Marine Highway System, made several runs on the Hollis–Ketchikan route before Stikine could be returned to service.
