= Craig, Alaska =

Town in Alaska

Craig Sháan Séet
- City
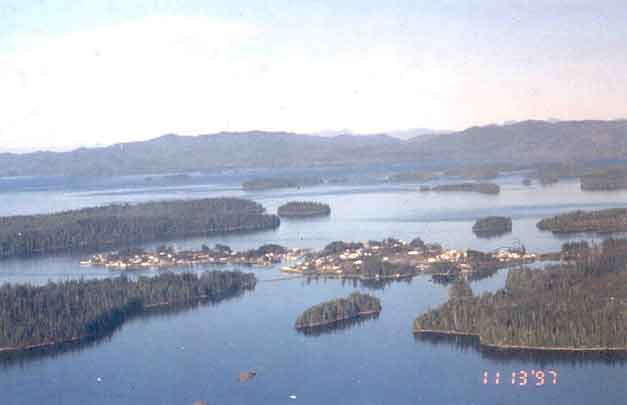
- Oblique aerial view of Craig from the south

- Location in Alaska
- Coordinates: 55°28′35″N 133°08′54″W
- Country: United States
- State: Alaska
- Borough: Unorganized
- Census area: Prince of Wales-Hyder
- Township: T74S R81E Copper River Meridian
- Settled: 1907
- Incorporated: March 1, 1922 (2nd-class city)
- Incorporated: 1973 (1st-class city)

Government
  - Type: Mayor–council
  - Mayor: Timothy O'Connor
  - State senator: Bert Stedman (R)
  - State rep.: Rebecca Himschoot (I)

Area
  - Total: 9.51 sq mi (24.62 km^{2})
  - Land: 6.69 sq mi (17.32 km^{2})
  - Water: 2.82 sq mi (7.30 km^{2})
- Elevation: 23 ft (7 m)

Population (2020)
  - Total: 1,036
  - Density: 154.9/sq mi (59.81/km^{2})
- Time zone: UTC-9 (Alaska (AKST))
  - Summer (DST): UTC-8 (AKDT)
- ZIP code: 99921
- Area code: 907
- FIPS code: 02-17740
- GNIS feature ID: 1421260; 2419374
- Website: www.CraigAK.com

Craig (Tlingit: Sháan Séet) is a city in the Prince of Wales-Hyder Census Area in the Unorganized Borough in the U.S. state of Alaska. The population was 1,036 at the 2020 census, down from 1,201 in 2010.

Craig is the headquarters of the Craig Tribal Association, a federally recognized tribe of Alaska Natives.

== Geography ==
Craig is the largest town on Prince of Wales Island, the fourth-largest island in the United States. Craig is approximately 56 miles (90 km) by air northwest of Ketchikan and 220 miles (350 km) south of Juneau.

According to the United States Census Bureau, the city has a total area of 9.4 square miles (24.3 km^{2}), of which, 6.7 square miles (17.4 km^{2}) of it is land and 2.7 square miles (7.0 km^{2}) of it (28.94%) is water.

== History ==
Originally, Craig's townsite was a temporary fishing camp used for gathering herring.

=== Name ===
Craig was named after Craig Miller (also spelled Millar) who established a fish saltery on nearby Fish Egg Island in 1907 with the assistance of the local Haida natives who moved onto Prince of Wales Island, being driven from Haida Gwaii (British Columbia's Queen Charlotte Islands) starting in the 18th century. Craig Miller constructed a cold storage plant and packing company at the present site of Craig, and in 1922 was instrumental in the incorporation of the city (originally as an Alaska second-class city within the Alaska Territory, pre-statehood).

=== Growth ===
The commercial fishing industry was responsible for Craig's relatively large population compared to neighboring communities. In the 1930s, record pink salmon runs brought many new settlers. The 1950s saw a collapse of the fishing industry because of depleted salmon populations. In 1972, a large sawmill was established nearby providing a steady source of year-round employment. Today, Craig relies on commercial fishing, fish processing, and the timber industry.

=== 1982 murders ===
On September 7, 1982, the fishing boat Investor was found burning off the coast of Craig, and the boat's passengers and crew were found to have been killed. Due to the badly burned state of the bodies, investigators were only certain that they had recovered the remains of seven bodies, but a coroner's jury ruled that all eight who were aboard the boat had been killed by gunshot wounds from a .22-caliber firearm (either a handgun or rifle). The boat's owner, Mark Coulthurst, from Blaine, Washington, his wife Irene, and their two young children were among the victims. In September 1984, a suspect, John Kenneth Peel, from Bellingham, Washington, was arrested for the murders. Peel's first trial ended in a hung jury, and his retrial, in 1988, ended in his acquittal. In 2017, Tim DeSpain, spokesman for the Alaska State Troopers stated that "the case is closed".

=== 2013 earthquake ===
On January 5, 2013, at 3:58 am ET Craig was hit by a 7.5-magnitude offshore earthquake 63 miles (102 km) west of the town. Regional tsunami warnings and advisories were issued. Voluntary evacuations of the town occurred. Despite this, no fatalities, serious injuries, or incidents of damage were reported and the tsunami threat never materialized other than minor, localized sea level rises.

== Demographics ==
Historical population
Census	Pop.	Note	%±
1920	212		—
1930	231		9.0%
1940	505		118.6%
1950	374		−25.9%
1960	273		−27.0%
1970	272		−0.4%
1980	527		93.8%
1990	1,260		139.1%
2000	1,397		10.9%
2010	1,201		−14.0%
2020	1,036		−13.7%
U.S. Decennial Census

Craig first appeared on the 1920 U.S. Census as an unincorporated village. It incorporated in 1922.

Craig's demographic characteristics have varied following trends in the commercial fishing industry, from 1980 through 2000 Craig's population more than doubled.

=== 2020 census ===
As of the 2020 census, Craig had a population of 1,036. The median age was 39.6 years. 24.3% of residents were under the age of 18 and 14.6% of residents were 65 years of age or older. For every 100 females there were 113.2 males, and for every 100 females age 18 and over there were 113.0 males age 18 and over.

0.0% of residents lived in urban areas, while 100.0% lived in rural areas.

There were 425 households in Craig, of which 30.6% had children under the age of 18 living in them. Of all households, 38.6% were married-couple households, 26.8% were households with a male householder and no spouse or partner present, and 23.8% were households with a female householder and no spouse or partner present. About 33.2% of all households were made up of individuals and 11.1% had someone living alone who was 65 years of age or older.

There were 512 housing units, of which 17.0% were vacant. The homeowner vacancy rate was 1.7% and the rental vacancy rate was 13.2%.

Racial composition as of the 2020 census
Race	Number	Percent
White	636	61.4%
Black or African American	2	0.2%
American Indian and Alaska Native	214	20.7%
Asian	14	1.4%
Native Hawaiian and Other Pacific Islander	0	0.0%
Some other race	10	1.0%
Two or more races	160	15.4%
Hispanic or Latino (of any race)	44	4.2%

=== 2000 census ===
As of the census of 2000, there were 1,397 people, 523 households, and 348 families residing in the city. The population density was 209.1 inhabitants per square mile (80.7/km^{2}). There were 580 housing units at an average density of 86.8 per square mile (33.5/km^{2}). The racial makeup of the city was 67.07% White, 0.07% Black or African American, 21.69% Native American, 0.57% Asian, 0.57% from other races, and 10.02% from two or more races. 2.79% of the population were Hispanic or Latino of any race.

There were 523 households, out of which 41.1% had children under the age of 18 living with them, 49.9% were married couples living together, 11.5% had a female householder with no husband present, and 33.3% were non-families. 25.2% of all households were made up of individuals, and 3.8% had someone living alone who was 65 years of age or older. The average household size was 2.63 and the average family size was 3.16.

In the city, the age distribution of the population shows 31.9% under the age of 18, 7.9% from 18 to 24, 31.8% from 25 to 44, 23.9% from 45 to 64, and 4.6% who were 65 years of age or older. The median age was 34 years. For every 100 females, there were 119.7 males. For every 100 females age 18 and over, there were 118.3 males.

The median income for a household in the city was $45,298, and the median income for a family was $52,500. Males had a median income of $41,111 versus $23,558 for females. The per capita income for the city was $20,176. About 7.8% of families and 9.8% of the population were below the poverty line, including 13.4% of those under age 18 and none of those age 65 or over.

== Climate ==
Craig has an oceanic climate (Köppen Cfb). Summers are mild with cool nights, while winters are chilly and wet. Precipitation is abundant year-round but is heaviest in autumn.

Climate data for Craig, Alaska (1991–2020 normals, extremes 1936–present)
Month	Jan	Feb	Mar	Apr	May	Jun	Jul	Aug	Sep	Oct	Nov	Dec	Year
Record high °F (°C)	65 (18)	73 (23)	64 (18)	74 (23)	86 (30)	88 (31)	79 (26)	84 (29)	76 (24)	73 (23)	59 (15)	63 (17)	88 (31)
Mean maximum °F (°C)	52.1 (11.2)	52.5 (11.4)	54.0 (12.2)	61.5 (16.4)	68.1 (20.1)	71.7 (22.1)	72.4 (22.4)	73.3 (22.9)	69.0 (20.6)	61.2 (16.2)	53.4 (11.9)	50.4 (10.2)	76.9 (24.9)
Mean daily maximum °F (°C)	39.3 (4.1)	40.0 (4.4)	41.7 (5.4)	47.2 (8.4)	53.0 (11.7)	56.7 (13.7)	59.7 (15.4)	61.0 (16.1)	56.8 (13.8)	49.8 (9.9)	43.0 (6.1)	39.6 (4.2)	49.0 (9.4)
Daily mean °F (°C)	36.1 (2.3)	36.1 (2.3)	37.3 (2.9)	42.2 (5.7)	48.0 (8.9)	52.4 (11.3)	55.8 (13.2)	56.8 (13.8)	52.6 (11.4)	45.7 (7.6)	39.6 (4.2)	36.6 (2.6)	44.9 (7.2)
Mean daily minimum °F (°C)	33.0 (0.6)	32.1 (0.1)	32.8 (0.4)	37.3 (2.9)	42.9 (6.1)	48.2 (9.0)	52.0 (11.1)	52.7 (11.5)	48.4 (9.1)	41.7 (5.4)	36.3 (2.4)	33.5 (0.8)	40.9 (4.9)
Mean minimum °F (°C)	19.6 (−6.9)	21.4 (−5.9)	22.2 (−5.4)	30.2 (−1.0)	35.6 (2.0)	41.5 (5.3)	46.8 (8.2)	47.1 (8.4)	40.4 (4.7)	32.2 (0.1)	25.3 (−3.7)	22.0 (−5.6)	14.3 (−9.8)
Record low °F (°C)	−2 (−19)	5 (−15)	4 (−16)	15 (−9)	23 (−5)	30 (−1)	38 (3)	33 (1)	30 (−1)	23 (−5)	11 (−12)	2 (−17)	−2 (−19)
Average precipitation inches (mm)	9.08 (231)	6.90 (175)	8.12 (206)	7.16 (182)	5.50 (140)	3.96 (101)	5.11 (130)	7.34 (186)	10.43 (265)	13.12 (333)	12.34 (313)	10.86 (276)	99.92 (2,538)
Average snowfall inches (cm)	4.0 (10)	3.6 (9.1)	2.3 (5.8)	0.4 (1.0)	0.0 (0.0)	0.0 (0.0)	0.0 (0.0)	0.0 (0.0)	0.0 (0.0)	0.0 (0.0)	1.6 (4.1)	3.0 (7.6)	14.9 (37.6)
Average precipitation days (≥ 0.01 in)	23.1	16.2	20.5	20.6	17.2	17.6	16.8	19.7	20.7	24.3	24.4	22.5	243.6
Average snowy days (≥ 0.1 in)	2.8	2.1	2.1	0.4	0.0	0.0	0.0	0.0	0.0	0.0	1.1	2.1	10.6
Source 1: NOAA
Source 2: National Weather Service

== Transportation ==
Craig, the island's largest population center and administrative hub for many island companies and organizations, actually has limited-direct transportation off Prince of Wales Island.

=== Seaplane base ===
Transportation is primarily via floatplane charters at Craig Seaplane Base. Klawock Airport can accommodate wheeled-aircraft and is a short drive away.

=== Ferry ===
Inter-Island Ferry Authority provides regularly scheduled year-round ferry service between Ketchikan and Hollis located on the Eastern coast of Prince of Wales island. The Inter-Island Ferry Authority's central offices are located in Klawock. The ferry terminal is located an hour drive outside of Craig and the ferry takes 3 hours to get to Ketchikan, Alaska.

There are a few marine shipping companies providing scheduled cargo barge service to South-Eastern, Alaska. Craig is usually one of their ports-of-call, handling inter-modal shipping containers for deliveries to other communities.

=== Shuttle ===
Prince of Wales Transportation based in Craig, provides island-wide shuttle services from the ferry terminals to the other communities and island attractions.

== Economy ==
Commercial fishing and related support business comprises the largest portion of Craig's economy. This is supplemented by timber industry related activities like the sawmill, and many residents use subsistence resources in addition to the formal economy.

In 2000, Craig had 42 vessel owners with operations in federal fisheries, 84 vessel owners with operations in state fisheries, and 149 registered crew members; 199 residents held 437 commercial fishing permits; 3,405 sport fishing licenses were sold, 2,590 licenses to non-residents of Alaska.

Commercial fishing generates much of the income in Craig. There are two harbors in the center of town one which primarily contains smaller charter and recreational boats, and the North Cove Harbor where the trollers, seiners, longliners, shrimp, crab, and dive boats that make up the local fleet are moored. During the peak of the fishing season in summer, the harbor is usually so full that boats must anchor out in the bay.

Tourism provides jobs and income to the community. Many charter fishing lodges cater to guests who visit the island for the salmon fishing as well as black bear and deer hunting.

The other main employer in Craig is the U.S. Forest Service. The rest of the economy is mainly supportive. There is a city-run medical clinic, a few restaurants, a general store, two banks, a grocery store, a coffeeshop/bookstore, clothing store, gift store, nursery and outdoor outfitter.

=== Schools ===
Craig has an elementary, middle, high school and an alternative school with 35 teachers and about 300 students.

=== Utilities ===
City of Craig provides piped water from the North Fork Lake reservoir, as well as providing a public sewage system.

Alaska Power & Telephone (an employee owned company) provides hydro-electric power, telephone, and internet service to much of southeastern Alaska, including Craig. There are a few cellular carriers providing service on Prince of Wales Island, mostly to the more densely populated communities like Craig.

== Notable people ==
- Holly Madison (born 1979), model, television personality; one of the stars of the E! channel's The Girls Next Door

== Notes ==
- A: Alaska's boroughs are equivalent to counties in other U.S. states.
- B: Census Areas are abstractions of the U.S. Census Bureau to either consolidate or sub-divide legal-official civil sub-divisions to make counting and presenting population statistics easier and more meaningful. Census abstractions have no legal or official basis in either federal or state law. other than for determining federal electoral boundaries and federal assistance applications. In Craig's case: the Prince of Wales-Hyder Census Area provides a method of subdividing the huge Unorganized Borough (over half of Alaska's area, 374,712 square miles (970,500 km^{2}), an area larger than any other U.S. state, with a population of 81,803, 13% in the 2000 Census), and consolidating Craig statistics with "nearby" communities on Prince of Wales Island along with other "nearby" communities surrounding Ketchikan.

C: Craig incorporated in Territory of Alaska as a second-class city.
D: Craig (re-)incorporated as a first-class city in State of Alaska.
