= Klawock Airport =

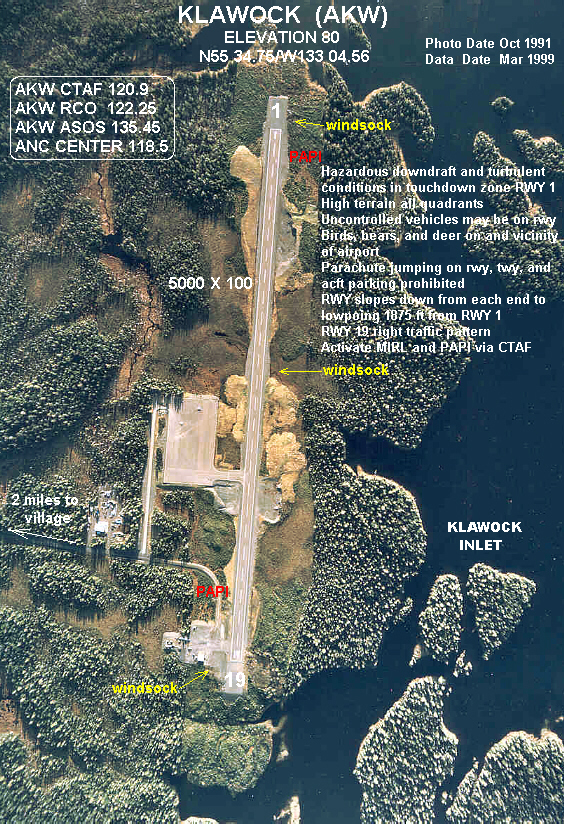
- Overhead-Southwest
- IATA: KLW; ICAO: PAKW; FAA LID: AKW

Summary
- Airport type: Public
- Owner: Alaska DOT&PF - Southeastern Region
- Serves: Klawock, Alaska
- Elevation AMSL: 80 ft (24 m)
- Coordinates: 55°34′45″N 133°04′34″W

Map
- Location within Alaska

Runways
Direction	Length		Surface
Direction	ft	m	Surface
2/20	5,000	1,524	Asphalt

Statistics (2006)
- Aircraft operations: 4,000
- Based aircraft: 4
- Source: Federal Aviation Administration

Klawock Airport (IATA: KLW, ICAO: PAKW, FAA LID: AKW) is a state-owned public-use airport located two nautical miles (3.7 km) northeast of the central business district of Klawock, a city in the Prince of Wales-Hyder Census Area of the U.S. state of Alaska.

Although most U.S. airports use the same three-letter location identifier for the FAA and IATA, this airport is assigned AKW by the FAA and KLW by the IATA, IATA assigns AKW to the Aghajari Airport.

== Facilities and aircraft ==
Klawock Airport has one asphalt paved runway designated 2/20 which measures 5,000 by 100 feet (1,524 x 30 m). For the 12-month period ending December 31, 2006, the airport had 4,000 aircraft operations, an average of 10 per day: 83% air taxi and 18% general aviation. At that time there were four single-engine aircraft based at this airport.

== Airlines and destinations ==
Airlines	Destinations
Alaska Seaplanes	Juneau, Sitka
Island Air Express	Ketchikan

== Accidents ==
On April 6, 2005, about 14:35 Alaska daylight time, a twin-engine Britten-Norman BN-2A Islander airplane, N29884, sustained substantial damage following a main landing gear component failure and subsequent loss of control while landing at the Klawock Airport, Klawock, Alaska. The flight was conducted under Title 14, CFR Part 135, as a scheduled domestic passenger flight operated by LAB Flying Service, Haines, Alaska, as Flight 609. The airline transport certified pilot and the two passengers were not injured. Visual meteorological conditions prevailed, and VFR company flight following procedures were in effect. The accident flight originated at the Ketchikan Airport, Ketchikan, Alaska, about 14:00 Alaska daylight time.

As the pilot applied the brakes, the airplane veered to the left, and he was unable to keep the plane on the runway surface. The airplane continued off the left side of the runway, and the nose of the airplane struck a drainage ditch. The airplane sustained substantial damage to the fuselage.

During a post-accident inspection, maintenance personnel discovered a broken landing gear oleo attachment bracket on the left main landing gear strut assembly. The manufacturer had changed the design of the oleo attachment bracket which was made of aluminum alloy. The newly designed oleo attachment bracket is made of steel.

The FAA inspector said that during the last main landing gear overhaul, the operator elected to re-install the old style aluminum alloy oleo attachment brackets, primarily due to the cost of the new style steel oleo attachment brackets.

== See also ==
- Klawock Seaplane Base
- List of airports in Alaska
