= Inter-Island Ferry Authority =

The Inter-Island Ferry Authority (IFA) is a ferry service in the U.S. state of Alaska with its headquarters in Hollis, Alaska on Prince of Wales Island.

== History ==
The Inter-Island Ferry Authority was created in 1997 by the Prince of Wales Island communities of Klawock, Craig, Thorne Bay, Coffman Cove in addition to the communities of Petersburg and Wrangell. By 1998, the state Department of Transportation was behind the idea of a shuttle ferry service between Prince of Wales Island and outlying communities and soon the Alaska Congressional delegation secured funding for two day boats to seed the ferry authority. In 2002, the first vessel, the M/V Prince of Wales, inaugurated service between Hollis and Ketchikan, and in 2006, the M/V Stikine followed suit with a northerly route.

=== Traffic ===
One of the primary reasons for the creation of the authority was the spotty service to Prince of Wales Island provided by the Alaska Marine Highway System, which, while regular, was often placed at inconvenient times, specifically the regular occurrence of ferries near midnight, to the annoyance of many island residents. In its last two years of operation to Prince of Wales Island (on the same Hollis-Ketchikan route the IFA operates) it averaged 38,615 passengers and 10,644 vehicles annually. In the IFA, on its first year of operation, carried 54,906 passengers and 14,156 vehicles.

== Routes and vessels ==
The Inter-Island Ferry Authority owns two vessels:

- M/V Prince of Wales
- M/V Stikine

As of 2013, the IFA offers daily, round-trip service between Hollis, on Prince of Wales Island, and Ketchikan.

The Stikine or Prince of Wales depart Hollis every morning at 8am and arrives in Ketchikan at 11am. The ferry then leaves Ketchikan at 3:30pm and arrives back in Hollis at 6:30pm. Although Hollis is the only Prince of Wales Island community to receive direct service from the ferries, since most of the island is connected by a network of logging industry-era roads, the ferry service also serves the Prince of Wales Island communities of Craig, Hydaburg, Kasaan, Klawock, Nautaki, Thorne Bay, and Whale Pass.

The Stikine formerly provided round-trip service from Coffman Cove to Wrangell and Petersburg for the summers of 2006, 2007 and 2008, but that route was suspended after the summer of 2008.

A new Authority, the Rainforest Islands Ferry Authority, was created and in 2014 may possibly operate the North End route. The Authority would connect Coffman Cove with Wrangell and Petersburg, and may also provide service to Ketchikan. In 2012, the authority purchased the Ashley Alyse McCall, a former oil-rig supply vessel built in 1992 that is 160 feet (49 m) long and can carry 14 vehicles and 70 passengers. The McCall will be renamed the Rainforest Islander.

== See also ==
- BC Ferries, a ferry service similar to the IFA just south of Alaska in British Columbia, Canada
- Ketchikan International Airport Ferry
