= Lituya Glacier =

Glacier in Alaska, United States

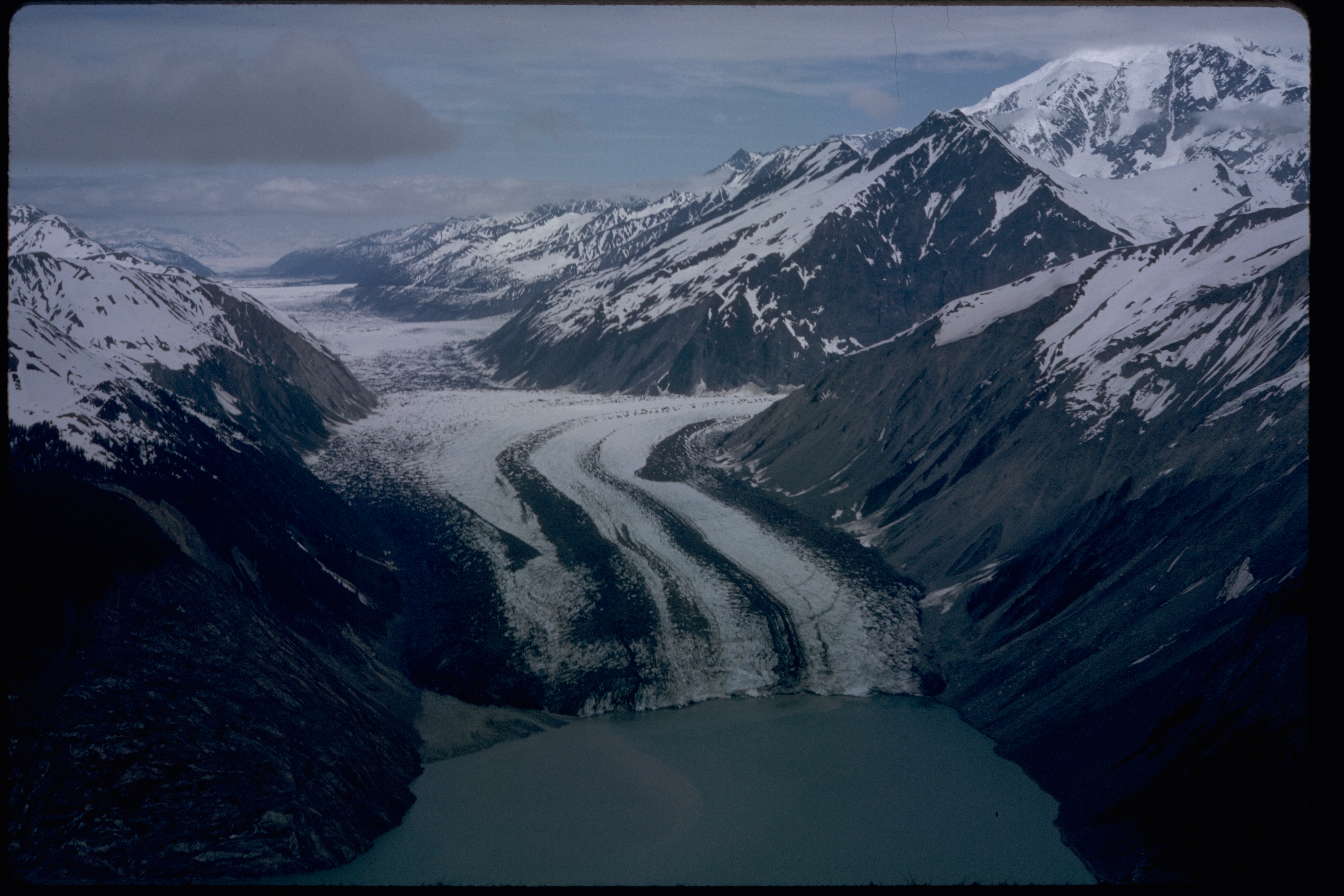
- Lituya Glacier

- Location within Alaska
- Type: Tidewater glacier
- Location: Hoonah-Angoon Census Area, Alaska, U.S.
- Coordinates: 58°43′25″N 137°29′33″W
- Length: 11 m (36 ft)
- Terminus: Ocean (Lituya Bay)
- Status: Retreating

Lituya Glacier is a tidewater glacier in the U.S. state of Alaska. Located at 58°43′25″N 137°29′33″W inside Glacier Bay National Park and Preserve, its source is in the Fairweather Range and it feeds into Lituya Bay on the gulf coast of Southeast Alaska.

It played a significant role in the 1958 Lituya Bay megatsunami. Over time, the glacier’s movement and retreat carved Lituya Bay into a distinctive geographic formation characterized by steep walls, a very deep submerged bottom, and a very narrow conditions opportunity for a megatsunami to occur.

The glacier is also the namesake of the Alaska Marine Highway ferry M/V Lituya.

== See also ==
- List of glaciers
