= Lituya Bay =

Fjord on the southeast coast of Alaska, United States

- Ltu.aa (Tlingit)
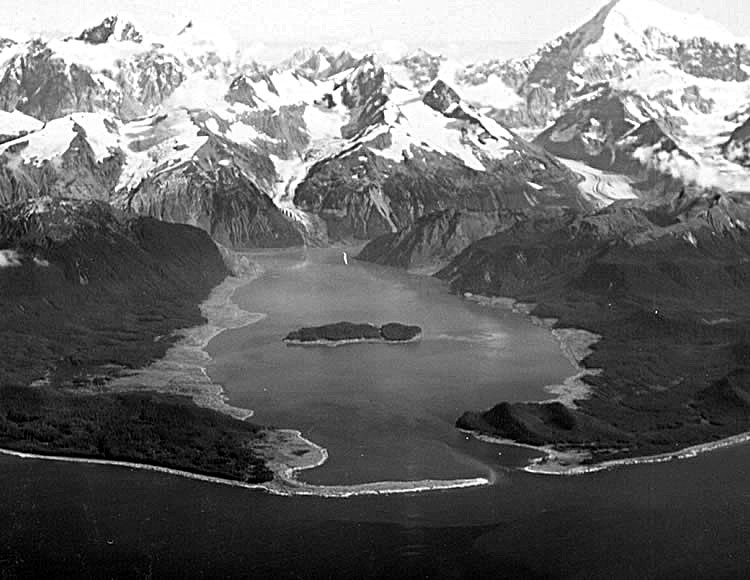
- Oblique aerial photograph of Lituya Bay in the summer of 1958. Damage from the 1958 megatsunami appears as the lighter-colored areas on the shores where trees have been stripped away.

- Location within Alaska
- Location: North Pacific Ocean
- Coordinates: 58°38′13″N 137°34′23″W
- River sources: Lituya Glacier; Cascade Glacier; Crillion Glacier
- Basin countries: United States
- Max. length: 14.5 km (9 mi)
- Max. width: 3.2 km (2 mi)

Lituya Bay (/lɪˈtjuːjə/; Tlingit: Ltu.aa [ɬtʰʊ̀ʔàː], meaning 'lake within the point') is a fjord located on the coast of the south-east part of the U.S. state of Alaska. It is 14.5 km (9 mi) long and 3.2 km (2 mi) wide at its widest point. The bay was noted in 1786 by Jean-François de Lapérouse, who named it Port des Français. The bay has also been known as Altona, Alituya and Ltooa. Lapérouse and his crew spent 26 days exploring the bay, but the cost was that twenty-one of his men perished in the tidal current in the bay. Lituya Bay is well known for the 1958 earthquake and megatsunami that produced the highest waves from a tsunami in recorded history.

== Description ==
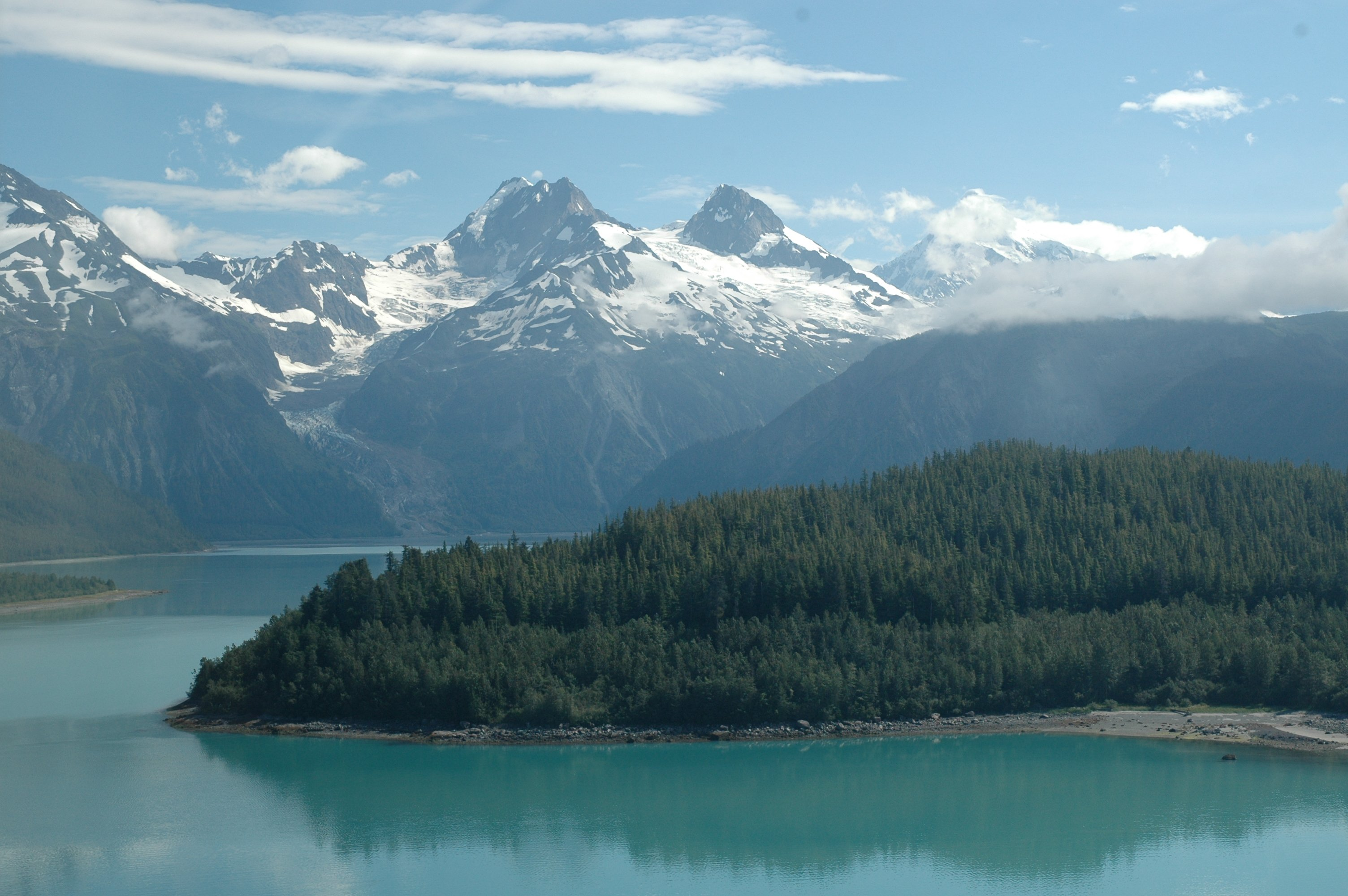
Cenotaph Island in Lituya Bay

The smaller Cascade and Crillon glaciers and the larger Lituya Glacier all spill into Lituya Bay, which is a part of Glacier Bay National Park and Preserve. Cenotaph Island is located roughly in the middle of the bay. Lapérouse named the island Cenotaph Island or "empty tomb", and built a memorial there to honor his men that perished. The entrance of the bay is approximately 500 m (0.31 mi) wide, with a narrow navigable channel.

The bay is known for its tremendous size tides, which have a range of approximately 3 m (9.8 ft). Tidal currents in the entrance reach 9.4 km/h (5.1 kn). The entrance is considered dangerous to navigation, especially when the tidal currents are running, but the interior of the bay provides good protection to anchored ships.

Lituya Bay is also famous for four recorded tsunamis, in 1854, 1899, 1936, and 1958. In the twentieth century, there have been nine major earthquakes at Lituya Bay due to its location on the active Fairweather Fault. Geologist Don Miller, who flew over the bay 12 hours after the 1958 earthquake, estimated that the odds of another megatsunami are about 9,000 to 1, even though Lituya Bay lies on the Fairweather Fault.

The bay is mentioned in Jack London's short story, "The Unexpected". (In that story, the name of the bay is spelled "Latuya".)

== The Tlingit People of Lituya Bay ==
When Jean‑François de Lapérouse explored Lituya Bay in 1786, he described it as a busy summer gathering place used by skilled Tlingit seamen. He saw new canoes arriving every day and estimated that 300–400 people were present at any given time with roughly 700–800 total visitors during the month he was there. His observations highlight the on water travel as the Tlingit men were hesitant to travel with him on land. Lapérouse also noted that although they often went barefoot, there were no calluses on the feet of the Tlingit men, which lead him to believe that they traveled mainly by canoe or on snowshoes.

The Tlingit told a story about a powerful being known as Kah Lituya or the "Man of Lituya", who lives near the entrance of the bay. The story says that he attacks anyone who enters his territory and turns them into bears who serve him. When people enter the bay, the "Man of Lituya" and his bears shake the surface of the water to create the dangerous waves for which Lituya Bay is known.

A carved wooden pipe acquired in 1888 from the chief of the Tuck-tane-ton family of the Hoon-ah Kow, represents the Lituya Bay legend. It depicts a frog and a bear creating waves to overturn a canoe. The pipe was used in ceremonies, including funerals and discussions or significant community matters.

== 1958 megatsunami ==
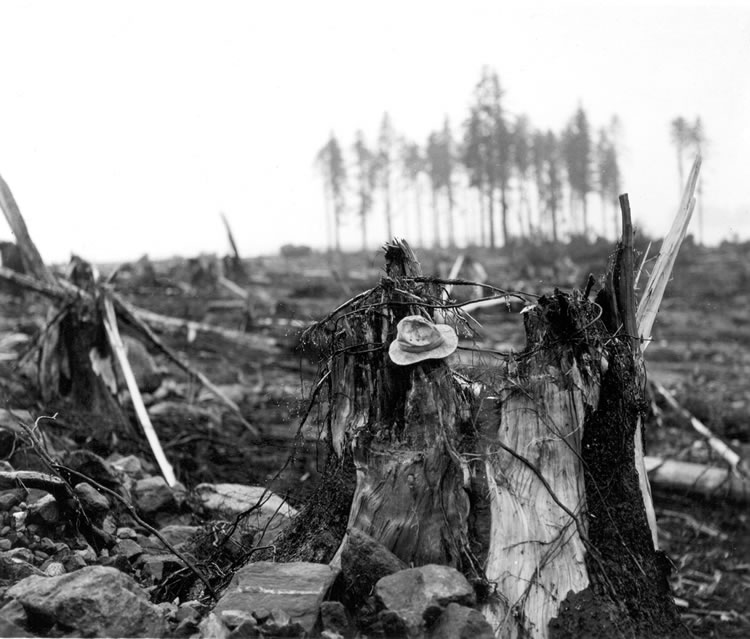
Spruce tree shattered by the force of the water

The same topography that leads to the heavy tidal currents also created the tsunami with the highest runup against a hillside in recorded history. On the night of July 9, 1958, an earthquake caused a landslide in the Gilbert Inlet at the head of the bay, generating a massive megatsunami which had sufficient energy to run up the hill slope just opposite of the landslide to a height measuring 1,719 feet (524 m), taller than the Empire State Building. The earthquake was so powerful, it registered in Anchorage, which is 470 miles away. Yakutat, Alaska, located 100 miles northeast of Lituya Bay, also experienced non-severe property damage. There were three fishing boats anchored near the entrance of Lituya Bay on the day the giant wave occurred. One boat (the Sunmore) was sunk by the wave and debris as it attempted to exit the bay, and the two people on board (a married couple, the Wagners) were killed. The second boat (the Badger) was carried across the La Chaussee Spit into the ocean, hit by a floating log and sunk but not before its occupants (a married couple, the Swansons) in spite of injuries, managed to board a skiff ultimately to be rescued. The third boat, the Edrie, crewed by father and son the Ulriches, was anchored at the opposite side of the bay entrance. The father, Howard, turned the boat to face the wave, which picked her up, snapped her anchor chain, carried her above the trees but then washed her back into the bay with no major damage. William A. Swanson and Howard G. Ulrich provided accounts of what they observed. Based on Swanson's description of the length of time it took the wave to reach his boat after overtopping Cenotaph Island near the bay's entrance, the wave may have been traveling 120 mph (190 km/h). When it reached the open sea, however, it dissipated quickly. This incident was the first direct evidence and eyewitness report of the existence of megatsunamis. Due to the devastation that occurred from the 1958 megatsunami, Anthony Picasso, Geohazard Mitigation Coordinator, Alaska DHSEM states that scientists in Alaska are monitoring locations around the state that are prone for these seismic events and are prepared to activate the State Emergency Operations Center to protect the people in Alaska from danger in the event another tsunami occurs.

== See also ==
- Lituya Mountain
