= Hollis, Alaska =

- CDP
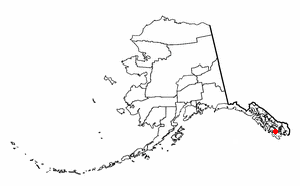
- Location of Hollis, Alaska
- Coordinates: 55°29′11″N 132°38′22″W
- Country: United States
- State: Alaska

Government
  - State senator: Bert Stedman (R)
  - State rep.: Rebecca Himschoot (I)

Area
  - Total: 66.02 sq mi (170.98 km^{2})
  - Land: 65.06 sq mi (168.51 km^{2})
  - Water: 0.95 sq mi (2.47 km^{2})
- Elevation: 190 ft (58 m)

Population (2020)
  - Total: 65
  - Density: 1.0/sq mi (0.39/km^{2})
- Time zone: UTC-9 (Alaska (AKST))
  - Summer (DST): UTC-8 (AKDT)
- ZIP code: 99950
- Area code: 907
- FIPS code: 02-32810
- GNIS feature ID: 1866952
- Website: hollisalaska.org

Hollis is a census-designated place (CDP) on Prince of Wales Island in Prince of Wales-Hyder Census Area, Alaska, United States. At the 2020 census the population was 65, down from 139 in 2000.

== Geography ==
According to the United States Census Bureau, the CDP has a total area of 64.6 sq mi (167 km^{2}), of which, 63.2 sq mi (164 km^{2}) of it is land and 1.4 sq mi (3.6 km^{2}) of it (2.15%) is water.

== Climate ==
Hollis has an oceanic climate (Köppen Cfb).

Climate data for Hollis
Month	Jan	Feb	Mar	Apr	May	Jun	Jul	Aug	Sep	Oct	Nov	Dec	Year
Record high °F (°C)	58 (14)	60 (16)	62 (17)	73 (23)	79 (26)	91 (33)	87 (31)	86 (30)	79 (26)	66 (19)	64 (18)	58 (14)	91 (33)
Mean daily maximum °F (°C)	36.6 (2.6)	39.3 (4.1)	42.8 (6.0)	49.4 (9.7)	57.4 (14.1)	62.3 (16.8)	66.1 (18.9)	65.6 (18.7)	58.9 (14.9)	49.8 (9.9)	41.7 (5.4)	38.2 (3.4)	50.7 (10.4)
Mean daily minimum °F (°C)	27.6 (−2.4)	28.3 (−2.1)	30 (−1)	33.3 (0.7)	39.7 (4.3)	45.5 (7.5)	49.7 (9.8)	49.7 (9.8)	44.5 (6.9)	38.8 (3.8)	32.8 (0.4)	30.4 (−0.9)	37.5 (3.1)
Record low °F (°C)	−2 (−19)	−5 (−21)	7 (−14)	13 (−11)	24 (−4)	32 (0)	39 (4)	36 (2)	26 (−3)	23 (−5)	5 (−15)	3 (−16)	−5 (−21)
Average precipitation inches (mm)	10.41 (264)	8.3 (210)	8.09 (205)	6.41 (163)	4.3 (110)	3.08 (78)	3.39 (86)	5.11 (130)	10.16 (258)	15.93 (405)	14.63 (372)	12.99 (330)	102.78 (2,611)
Average snowfall inches (cm)	22 (56)	7.1 (18)	2.4 (6.1)	0.1 (0.25)	0 (0)	0 (0)	0 (0)	0 (0)	0 (0)	0 (0)	4.6 (12)	6.2 (16)	42.3 (107)
Average precipitation days	20	18	21	19	18	16	15	17	20	26	24	22	236

== Demographics ==
Historical population
Census	Pop.	Note	%±
1960	292		—
1990	111		—
2000	139		25.2%
2010	112		−19.4%
2020	65		−42.0%
U.S. Decennial Census

Hollis first appeared on the 1960 U.S. Census as an unincorporated community. It did not appear again until 1990, when it was made a census-designated place (CDP).

As of the census of 2000, there were 139 people, 55 households, and 38 families residing in the CDP. The population density was 2.2 inhabitants per square mile (0.85/km^{2}). There were 95 housing units at an average density of 1.5 per square mile (0.58/km^{2}). The racial makeup of the CDP was 89.93% White, 5.04% Native American, 0.72% Asian, and 4.32% from two or more races. 2.16% of the population were Hispanic or Latino of any race.

There were 55 households, out of which 36.4% had children under the age of 18 living with them, 60.0% were married couples living together, 3.6% had a female householder with no husband present, and 30.9% were non-families. 23.6% of all households were made up of individuals, and 12.7% had someone living alone who was 65 years of age or older. The average household size was 2.53 and the average family size was 3.00.

In the CDP, the population was spread out, with 28.8% under the age of 18, 4.3% from 18 to 24, 25.9% from 25 to 44, 32.4% from 45 to 64, and 8.6% who were 65 years of age or older. The median age was 41 years. For every 100 females, there were 131.7 males. For every 100 females age 18 and over, there were 141.5 males.

The median income for a household in the CDP was $43,750, and the median income for a family was $55,625. Males had a median income of $41,875 versus $13,750 for females. The per capita income for the CDP was $17,278. There were 6.5% of families and 9.3% of the population living below the poverty line, including 15.7% of under eighteens and none of those over 64.

== Education ==
Hollis School is part of the Southeast Island School District. In 2011, there were a documented 12 students attending.

== Transportation ==
Hollis has historically served as the transportation gateway for Prince of Wales Island to the regional hub of Ketchikan. There is a rental car company in Hollis called Hollis Adventure Rentals.

=== Ferry ===
At first, it was the only community of Prince of Wales Island to receive ferry access from the Alaska Marine Highway, but in 2002, the Marine Highway ceased service to Hollis in lieu of the new Inter-Island Ferry Authority (IFA). Now Hollis is homeport to the IFA's first ship, the M/V Prince of Wales which makes daily runs between Hollis and Ketchikan. As such, access to Ketchikan is available to Prince of Wales Island communities through the island's road network.

=== Shuttles and taxi ===
A few shuttle bus, taxi cab, and trucking companies provide regular service from the Hollis and Coffman Cove, Alaska ferry terminals to the other Prince of Wales island communities.
