= Sitka Pulp Mill =

The Sitka Pulp Mill was a pulp mill located on the North and West Shores of Sawmill Cove, approximately five miles East of Sitka, Alaska. In 1956, the mill site was purchased from Fred and John Van Horn by the Alaska Pulp Corporation. This was the first Japanese investment in the United States of America since World War II, and the mill operated from 1959 until 1993. The majority of production was used to create rayon fabric, and to supply Japan with logs to rebuild homes and infrastructure after World War II. In the later years of the mill, as the demand for rayon and logs for rebuilding decreased, the primary focus of the mill became the manufacture of paper.

== Origin ==
In September 1907, the Tongass National Forest was established, and by 1908, President Theodore Roosevelt and the U.S. Forest Service founder Gifford Pinchot have expanded it to 15.4 million acres. The Tongass National Forest became the largest national forest in the United States of America, and was viewed by many as an opportunity to convert old growth stands into sustainable young growth forests, with an emphasis on pulp production. In 1911, the United States Forest Service began to take an aggressive approach towards timber harvesting in Alaska, and started offering long-term 25-year contracts to potential investors, on the condition that a pulp mill along with a sawmill were constructed. Numerous contracts were advertised, but due to high operation costs, shipping, and rough terrain, many contracts received no bids. This caused lumber firms to rethink their methods for establishing a sustainable timber industry in Alaska.

In 1947, with the help of B. Frank Heintzleman, the Tongass Timber Act was established. It entailed up to five pulp timber sales in the Tongass National Forest, and increased contract duration from 25 to 50 years. It also authorized the Secretary of Agriculture to sell timber within the boundaries of the Tongass National Forest, on any vacant unappropriated lands that were claimed by either native entities or other people. This obligated the United States Forest Service to provide 13.5 billion board feet of timber to pulp companies, and allowed pulp mills to take control of selecting harvesting. This act also required the United States Forest Service to take up much of the logging and manufacturing costs, and awarding pulp company’s credits dollar for dollar on logging roads that were constructed.

The Tongass Timber Act helped establish the Ketchikan Pulp Company, followed by the Sitka Pulp Mill. The timber to support these mills increased harvest in the Tongass National Forest from 70 million board feet in 1954 to 405 million board feet in 1965.

== Operation ==
Over 450 local residents of Sitka were employed at the mill during its peak of manufacturing. The long-term contract that the Alaska Pulp Corporation agreed to committed 5.25 billion board feet. The primary sale area included Baranof Island and portions of the Chichagof Island.

The process of manufacturing at the Sitka Pulp Mill consisted of utilizing about 70 percent of Western Hemlock and 30 percent Sitka Spruce. The mill was able to debark logs as large as 1.8 meters in diameter and 7.2 meters in length. The warehouse and dock were able to accommodate 17,000 tons of baled pulp. The wood harvested was towed by water to the mill, then ground into chips for processing. The Sitka Pulp Mill used a magnesium sulfide process that created a slurry, followed by a chlorination bleaching process.

== Decline ==
Economic decline of the timber industry and increased environmental concerns regarding pulp production began to influence manufacturing at the Sitka Pulp Mill. In 1970, the Clean Air Act, followed by Clean Water Act in 1972 raised environmental standards. In 1990, Congress passed the Tongass Timber Reform Act to protect a million acres of land with high value for wildlife, fish, and local community uses from logging and road building. The Tongass Timber Reform Act also contained a provision that required harvesting of timber stands in proportion to their occurrence in the forest, rather than targeting the high-volume stands.

A decline in wood prices and a decreased demand for rayon also affected the economic viability of the Sitka Pulp Mill. Management priorities in the Tongass began to change as well when the Alaska National Interest Lands Conservation Act established 5.4 million acres of wilderness areas in the Tongass National Forest.

The combination of these factors resulted in closure of the Sitka Pulp Mill. The Alaska Pulp Corporation blamed the closure on provisions included in the Tongass Timber Reform Act, and sued the government for damages. The United States Forest Service terminated the timber contract, finding the Alaska Pulp Corporation in breach of contract for not upholding its obligation to operate the mill. The Japanese-based company was already in debt, and a judge ruled that the closure was due to economic factors rather than the Tongass Timber Reform Act.

== Environmental Impacts ==
Chemicals used during the production at the Sitka Pulp Mill consisted of sulfur magnesium oxide, sodium hydroxide, and chlorine gas. Wood ash, wastewater water treatment sludge, and petroleum byproducts were introduced into Sitka’s landfills and water systems during the Sitka Pulp Mill’s 34-year history. As a result, many of these harmful chemicals became present in the surrounding ecosystem, which may have affected human, animal, and plant populations. In 1999, the Alaska Department of Environmental Conservation took action to combat these environmental impacts - it has attempted to restore Sawmill Cove by disposing leftover hazardous waste at permitted facilities, as well as through bioremediation of contaminated soils, land use restrictions, and allowing natural ecological recovery.

== Today ==
The Alaska Pulp Company decided to demolish the mill site and donate the land to the city of Sitka. In 1999, the city of Sitka took control of the land, and removed much of the industrial debris, paving the main roads within the park. The former mill site is now known as Gary Paxton Industrial Park. Two of the large clarifying tanks are now home to the Fortress of the Bear tourist attraction.
