= Cerro Rico =

Mountain near Potosí, Bolivia

- Cerro Potosí / Sumaq Urqu
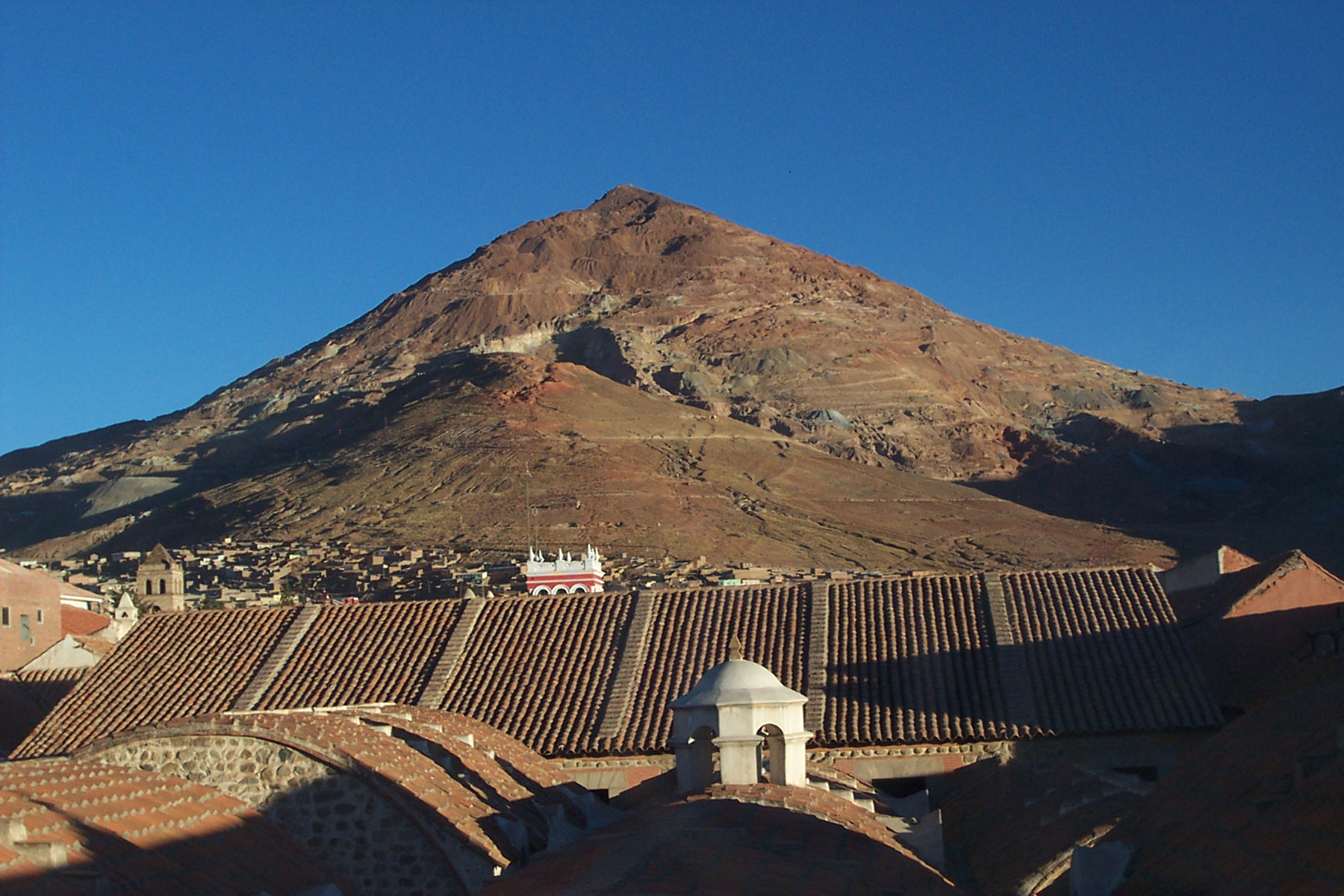
- View of Cerro Rico from Potosí

Highest point
- Elevation: 4,782 m (15,689 ft)
- Coordinates: 19°37′8″S 65°44′59″W

Geography
- Location within Bolivia
- Location: Bolivia, Potosí
- Parent range: Andes

Cerro Rico (Spanish for "Rich Mountain"), also known as Cerro Potosí ("Potosí Mountain") or Sumaq Urqu (Quechua sumaq "beautiful, good, pleasant", and urqu "mountain"); is a mountain in the Andes near the Bolivian city of Potosí. Cerro Rico—popularly conceived as being "made of" silver ore—is famous for having provided vast quantities of silver to the Spanish Empire, most of which was shipped to metropolitan Spain. It is estimated that approximately 85 percent of the silver produced in the central Andes during this period came from Cerro Rico.

As a result of mining operations, the city of Potosí became one of the largest cities in the New World. According to tradition, revolutionary leader Simón Bolívar once waved a flag from the summit of the mountain in a symbolic act associated with the founding of a new nation. One year later, Congress decided to change the flag's colors to yellow, red, and green and to include a coat of arms featuring a condor, an alpaca, and Cerro Rico.

Today mining in Cerro Rico remains an important economic activity, and is carried out by various mining cooperatives that work in underground mines as well as in the larger open-pit San Bartolomé mine operated by Empresa Minera Manquiri.

The mountain is largely barren, although a small number of plant species have colonized it, and vizcachas inhabit its slopes.

== History ==
The Cerro Rico de Potosí was the richest source of silver in the history of mankind. The extraction of mineral ores in Cerro Rico de Potosí began in 1545 by the Spanish Empire. From the 16th to the 18th century, 80% of the world's silver supply came out of this mine. After dramatic modifications in first century of Spanish mining in the hill including a mountaintop removal Cerro Rico acquired its current shape in the 17th century.

After centuries of extractive mining methods that severely damaged the local ecology, the mountain continues to be mined for silver to this day. Due to poor worker conditions, such as a lack of protective equipment against the constant inhalation of dust, many miners contract silicosis. They have a life expectancy of around 40 years. The mountain is still a significant contributor to the city's economy, employing some 15,000 miners.

As a result of centuries long mining, in 2011 a sinkhole in the top appeared and had to be filled with ultra-light cement. The summit also continues to sink a few centimetres every year. In 2014, UNESCO added Cerro Rico and Potosí to its list of endangered sites, owing to "uncontrolled mining operations" that risk "degrading the site".

== Labor and methods of extraction at Cerro Rico ==
The Spanish Empire used a forced labor system called "Repartimiento de Indios" (also known as "Repartimiento") to extract silver from Cerro Rico, though in 1574 the Spanish Viceroy Francisco de Toledo reintroduced the mita, an annual forced labor system used by the Inca Empire. During the first decades of extraction, the mines in Potosí had vast deposits of pure silver and silver chloride deposits, which made the extraction of silver relatively easy. Native American labor in the Andean regions was preferred by the Spanish Crown, as opposed to African slave labor, due to high mortality and low productivity rates.

By 1565, Cerro Rico had run out of high-grade silver ores. Extraction began anew after the introduction of a silver extraction method known as the patio process, using mercury to form silver amalgams and extract silver from low-grade ores. These ores of lower grade were known as paco in reference to their ochre colour. These corresponded to oxidized hypogene sulphides above the water table.

Repartimiento was also a system of cyclical labor, so after their required time was done, many Amerindians would continue working at the mines as free wage laborers or mingas, despite the harsh conditions.

Given the use of mercury and the high amount of silver extracted from the mines, mercury poisoning among the Amerindian laborers was common, which caused many miners to die. Other harsh conditions at both the mines and refining patios also caused the deaths of miners during the Spanish rule, and it is believed that around eight million miners died in total. However, other sources estimate that it was "hundreds of thousands," and that eight million deaths were actually the total number of deaths in the Viceroyalty of Peru, not just the mines in Potosí.

It is known as the "mountain that eats men" because of the large number of workers who died in the mines. The work of historians such as Peter Bakewell, Noble David Cook, Enrique Tandeter and Raquel Gil Montero portray a more accurate description of the human-labor issue (free and non-free workers) with completely different estimates.

== Bolivian Mining Cooperative ==
Bolivia's cooperative mining sector, whose center is in Potosí, has been given many privileges including favorable tax treatment to miners and exemption from labor and environmental regulations for cooperatives since the election of socialist president Evo Morales in 2006. After centuries of brutal Spanish extraction and forced labor, decades of foreign control and private investment in the late 20th century, and the failure of the state-run mining company COMIBOL led to the displacement of 25,000 miners following plummeting mineral prices in the 1990s, "informal, self-managed associations" began selling "unrefined product to private operators".

FENCOMIN (National Federation of Mining Cooperatives in Bolivia) was a vital player in insuring the successful popular election of Evo Morales and also functioned as one of the leaders in drafting Bolivia's new constitution establishing a plural mining economy (state, private, and cooperative). However, over the last ten years much conflict has arisen between cooperative miners and state miners. In 2006, state miners and cooperatives clashed at Huanuni leaving 16 dead leading to the firing of Morales' first Mining Minister, a member of FENCOMIN. Most recently in 2016, Bolivia's Deputy Interior Minister Rodolfo Illanes was tortured and killed, allegedly by Bolivian cooperative miners. This outburst of violence has led to clashes between cooperative miners and the police leaving five miners dead and severing a decade of strong ties between cooperative mining and the Morales government.

Reports in 2019 indicate that the current output of the mines was predominantly tin and zinc by then and only small amounts of silver. One report estimates that a full 88% of the miners in Bolivia, roughly 8,000 to 10,000 (depending on the source making the estimate), including children, were working for the cooperatives. A former miner discussed the great risks of working at Cerro Rico with a reporter, but said that those working there had few other alternatives for earning a living. "You have to be crazy to work in the mines, with the conditions. But there are no other alternatives."

== Mine ==
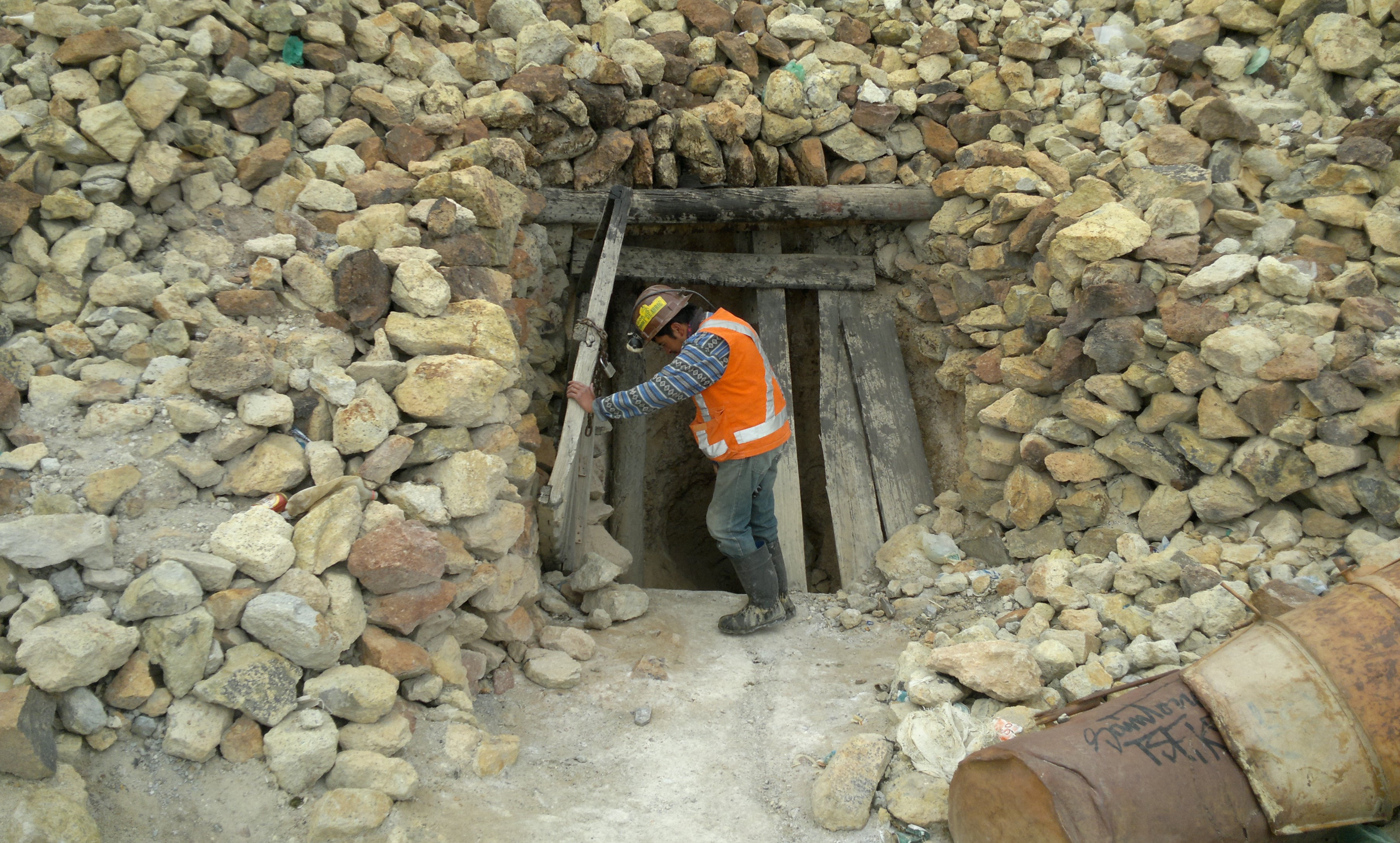
A mine entrance, Cerro Rico

Cerro Rico de Potosí was accidentally discovered in 1545 by Diego de Huallpa, a Quechua silver miner for the Spanish, while he was searching the mountain for an Inca shrine or traditional burial offering. The red mountain, now known as Cerro Rico, sits between the Porco and Sucre mines, which had previously been discovered, being at lower altitudes and therefore easier to mine.

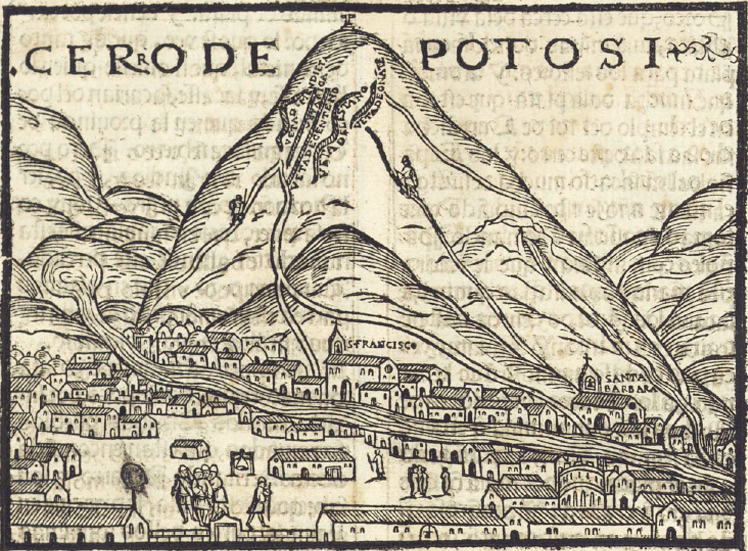
Potosí. The first image in Europe. Pedro Cieza de León, 1553.

Once Cerro Rico was found to carry predominantly silver ores, mining focus shifted to the harvesting of the more lucrative ore over ores like tin, zinc, and lead found in Porco and Sucre. Now one of the largest silver mines in Bolivia, and in the world, the Cerro Rico de Potosí mine to date has yielded an estimated 60,000 tons of silver, and deposits are thought to still contain estimated reserves of 1.76 billion ounces (50,000 tons) of silver and 540 million tons of ore grading 0.17% tin. The mine is located in the south of the country in Potosí Department.

== See also ==
- List of mountains in Bolivia
- Mining in Bolivia
- Potosí mountain range
- Empresa Minera Manquiri
- San Bartolomé mine
