= Kensington mine =

Mine in Alaska, USA

- Location within Alaska
- Location: 58°51′53″N 135°04′54″W

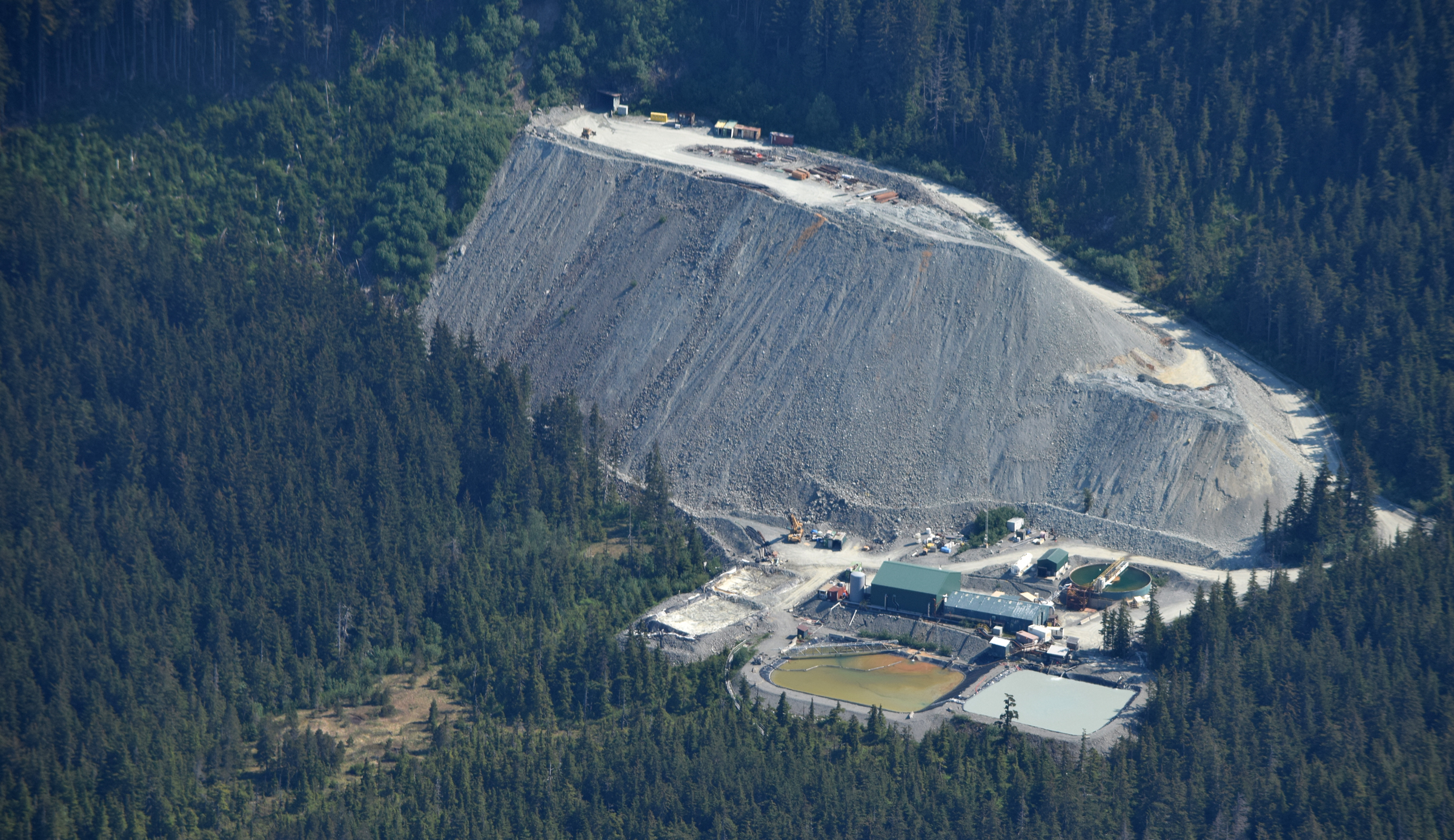
Aerial view of Kensington Mine Comet portal.

Kensington mine is a gold mine located 45 mi (72 km) north of Juneau, Alaska. The mine is owned by Coeur Alaska Inc., a subsidiary company of Coeur Mining.

In 1928 the mine halted operations, and since then Coeur Alaska has attempted to resume operations. In order to resume operations Coeur Alaska required a permit to dispose of tailings created by the milling of ore from the mine. A permit was acquired in 2005 from the United States Army Corps of Engineers to dispose of the tailings in Lower Slate Lake. Following the issuance of the permit for tailings disposal, a lawsuit was filed by a group of environmental non-governmental organizations. The Alaskan court sided with the mining company, and the decision was appealed and overturned by the United States Court of Appeals for the Ninth Circuit. Following the successful appeal, the issue was brought before the Supreme Court, who found in favor of the company by a vote of 6-3.
