= Southeast Alaska Conservation Council =

American environmental organization

- Abbreviation: SEACC
- Founded: 1977
- Type: Nonprofit
- Tax ID no.: 92-0062992
- Legal status: 501(c)(3)
- Headquarters: Juneau, Alaska
- Board Chair: Steve Kallick
- Board Vice Chair: Michelle Andool Meyer
- Executive Director: Maggie Rabb
- Website: https://www.seacc.org/

The Southeast Alaska Conservation Council (SEACC) is a non-profit organization that focuses on protecting the lands and waters of Southeast Alaska. They promote conservation and advocate for sustainable natural resource management. SEACC is located in the capital city of Alaska, Juneau. The environmental organization focuses on concerns in the Southeast region of Alaska, including the areas of the Panhandle, the Tongass National Forest, and the Inside Passage.

== Vision and Mission ==
SEACC's vision is: "Guided by the stewardship traditions of the Indigenous Peoples of Southeast Alaska, the air, land and waters of the world's largest temperate rainforest are protected." Its mission is: "To ensure our interdependent whole endures for the next 10,000 years, we listen, learn, educate and advocate, in collaboration with diverse communities and partners.".

== History ==
Large-scale clearcutting projects by the United States Forest Service were of great concern to environmental activists in the 1960s and 1970s. Specifically, the long-term permits the Forest Service had given two pulp mills allowed them to clear-cut ancient old-growth trees and turned them into pulp. In 1970, a group of Southeast Alaskans from communities across the entire region formed a group to oppose the unsustainable logging in the Tongass National Forest. They started as the Tongass National Forest preservation group. They mostly fought the large-scale old-growth logging but later changed their name to the Southeast Alaska Conservation Council. In 1977 SEACC became a federally recognized 501(c) organization.

=== Tongass Timber Reform Act ===
In 1975 the Forest Service released its 1975 Tongass plan, which proposed millions of acres to become wilderness areas. These areas were steep, rocky fjords or shifting glaciers that had not or never would be threatened by logging. Conservationists had been given 6 weeks to respond. SEACC came up with 45 areas that needed protection from logging. On March 7, 1975, conservationists from Southeast Alaska met in Sitka to discuss SEACC's Tongass Wilderness proposal. SEACC received help from the Sierra Club Alaska representative for their campaigns on this issue. In 1976 Ted Whitesell and Kay Greenough took SEACC to Washington, DC, for the first time for the National Forest Management Act hearings.

The March 1976 Congressional hearings in Washington were held because the Point Baker Association and plaintiffs Herb Zieske, Chuck Zieske, and Alan Stein had won a victory in the US District Court in Alaska on December 23, 1975, in which Judge Van der Heydt ordered 1) no trees could be cut unless they were dead or dying 2) and no trees could be cut at all north of a line between Calder Bay and Red Bay on Prince of Wales Island.

In March 1976, Alan Stein testified before Congress, representing the United Fishermen of Alaska and the Point Baker Association. The decision in Zieske threatened to shut down clearcut logging on the entire West Coast, so the timber industry pressed for immediate hearings to overturn the Zieske decision in Congress.

Senator Gravel brought hearings to Alaska in 1976 on the pending National Forest Management Act (NFMA) legislation. Still, committees had already reconciled vital issues. Senator Huddleston stated on pages 26 and 60–61 in the Hearings Record of the US Senate Subcommittee of Environment, Soil, Conservation, and Forestry of the Committee of Agriculture and Forestry (in Juneau, Ketchikan, and Sitka August 18 and 21, 1976) that the bill was ready for floor action before committees considered the August testimony on such issues as whether mandatory 300-foot buffer strips should remove the discretion of the USFS when laying out clear-cut. The president signed the National Forest Management Act of 1976 on October 22, 1976.

The draft Tongass plan of the following years still included most of its proposed wilderness areas in rocky areas. Some alternatives even proposed extensive clear-cut logging on pristine regions such as Admiralty Island and West Chicago. In 1977 seven conservation groups, including SEACC, formed the Alaska Coalition. Despite efforts, President Carter signed the Alaska National Interest Lands Conservation Act that protected 5.4 million acres of the 17 million-acre Tongass National Forest. The Alaska National Interest Lands Conservation Act (ANILCA) triggered SEACC to take more action and protect the old-growth forests of the Tongass from logging.

SEACC's proposal for protecting 45 areas was ignored in the Forest Service's 1979 Tongass Land Management Plan. Some important SEACC members resigned after this fallback. John Sisk described it as follows: The Tongass issue was over. The rest belonged to the timber companies." SEACC did not give up and took on smaller cases that included problems in the Tongass National Forest but also expanded to water pollution.

Bart Koehler took over SEACC in 1984 and published a document in 1986 that challenged the Forest Service. The report called: 'Last Stand' exposed the money-losing economic aspect of logging in the Tongass Forest. The report revealed how much money exactly was lost by the Forest Service every year. The report sparked a large debate, and SEACC took their concerns to Washington D.C. A hearing on Tongass National Forest was held on May 8 and 9 in 1986 by the House Interior Subcommittee on Public Lands. Koehler was leading a national Tongass reform campaign, in which he urged ending long-term contracts of the pulp mills, adding more wilderness areas, and cutting major subsidies for logging." This went on for a couple of years, and many talks and meetings with government officials and environmentalists passed. SEACC did not give up its fight for the Tongass Timber Reform Act and received much support.

A decade after the ANILCA Law passed, SEACC ushered through the first locally crafted federal lands protection bill they had been fighting for, for many years. President George Bush signed the Tongass Timber Reform Act on November 28, 1990. It is described as: "An Act to amend the Alaska National Interest Lands Conservation Act, to protect certain lands in the Tongass National Forest in perpetuity, to modify certain long-term timber contracts, to provide for protection of riparian habitat, and for other purposes." The law protected an additional 1.2 million acres of forestlands and canceled the pulp mill's contracts. The Tongass Timber Reform Act was the first major victory for SEACC. After his victory, Koehler moved to Montana to work for the Greater Yellowstone Coalition. In 1995 he moved back to Alaska after discovering that state senators Frank Murkowski, Ted Stevens, and Don Young had gained power and tried to change the Tongass Timber Reform Act. A year later, Koehler returned to Washington, D.C., to discuss this problem. Six years after the Tongass Timber Reform Act had passed, the Tongass National Forest was yet again a national issue. In the end, the Tongass Timber Reform Act led to two major mills in Sitka and Ketchikan having to shut their doors in 1997, and it protected an additional half a million hectares of forest lands. In 1997 the largest pulp mill, the Ketchikan Pulp Corporation, had to shut down (Durbin, 2005).

=== Coeur Alaska, Inc. v. Southeast Alaska Conservation Council ===
The Coeur Alaska, Inc. v. Southeast Alaska Conservation Council was a Supreme court case that ruled in favor of Coeur Alaska, Inc. SEACC, the Sierra Club, and Lynn Canal Conservation Inc. filed a lawsuit against Coeur Alaska, Inc: a mine developer. They had received a permit issued by the United States Army Corps of Engineers, allowing them to dump the toxic waste in the environment. The three environmental non-profit organizations argued that the permit for dumping toxic mine tailings into Lower Slate Lake violated sections 301(a), 301(e), and 306(e) of the Clean Water Act. The court ruled in favor of Coeur Alaska Inc.

=== SEACC United ===
SEACC's non-management employees unionized as SEACC United on December 9, 2022, with a public super-majority of all eligible (permanent, non-management) employees, in accordance with the National Labor Relations Act (NLRA). SEACC United filed a petition with the National Labor Relations Board (NLRB) for an election on December 19, 2022. SEACC management refused to voluntarily recognize the union, forcing the union to petition the National Labor Relations Board (NLRB) for an election on December 19, 2022.

SEACC leadership hired the global law firm, Littler Mendelson, known for specializing in "union avoidance", to challenge the NLRB's jurisdiction over the organization, claiming that it does not participate in interstate commerce and is therefor not subject to the federal labor act. On February 13, 2023, the NLRB rejected SEACC's "numerous novel arguments" and cited 80 years of precedent to affirm that "the board has broad jurisdiction over nearly all types of private employers, large and small, for-profit and non-profit," and directed an election to take place by mail-in ballot. SEACC appealed that decision, continuing to challenge its workers' federal right to union representation. On March 30, 2023, SEACC United won formal recognition in the NLRB election with a 3-1 vote, despite SEACC leadership contesting one of the ballots. SEACC United was affiliated with the Communications Workers of America Local 37074, an AFL-CIO affiliate.

On March 31, 2023, after being contacted by SEACC leadership, local news outlet, KINY News of the North bizarrely retracted a story covering the union's victory, removing it from publication rather than updating it with a correction.

SEACC continued to challenge its workers' union and released a statement immediately after the vote count indicating that leadership will not enter into bargaining until the NLRB is "ultimately and appropriately determined to have jurisdiction in this case." However, the February 13 decision did affirm its jurisdiction, and SEACC Board Chair Natalie Watson claimed in a December 30, 2022 Juneau Empire op-ed that organizational leadership "will stand by the results" of the election –– a claim not supported by SEACC's actions to contest the election. SEACC leadership filed objections to the election with the NLRB on April 6, 2023 that were ultimately overruled by the board on April 21, 2023 at the same time that it certified the election, affirming the union. On August 22, 2023, Alaska AFL-CIO President Joelle Hall published a commentary in The Alaska Current defending SEACC United, the Communications Workers of America, and the AFL-CIO from SEACC Board Chair Natalie Watson's bizarre, unprovoked attacks in a misleading email alert sent out to SEACC's email lists and posted to SEACC's blog.

In August 2024, the SEACC United was dissolved, after all unionized employees left the organization. All the newly hired positions in the immediate aftermath of their departure were non-union eligible, management positions, despite a lack of supervisory duties. An email from CWA Local 37074 stated: "Based on the preference expressed by the SEACC employees currently in the bargaining unit, there is no longer majority support for the union. Therefore the Denver Newspaper Guild - CWA Local 37074 asserts disinterest in the SEACC bargaining unit." At the time, only one employee remained in the bargaining unit.

SEACC United is believed to have been the first labor union of nonprofit advocacy workers in Alaska and enjoyed wide support across Alaska and the US for its efforts to democratize the workplace and to build relationships between the environmental and labor movements.

== Current work ==
SEACC continues to campaign against large-scale commercial logging on the Tongass National Forest and land managed by the State of Alaska. The Trump Administration issued an executive order on January, 20, 2025, announcing its intent to increase natural resource extraction in Alaska Unleashing Alaska's Extraordinary Resource Potential. The U.S. Department of Agriculture announced in June 2025 its intent to rescind the national Roadless Area Conservation Rule, which protects more than 9 million acres of the Tongass National Forest from commercial logging and roadbuilding. SEACC was joined by other national and Alaska based conservation groups, municipal and Tribal governments, and small businesses in opposition to the rescission SEACC Press Release: Tongass defenders blast the Trump Administration's rollback of Roadless Rule protections on America's largest forest. SEACC also monitors and organizes opposition to large timber sales and advocates for conservation views in forest management SEACC: Tongass Work.

On February 28, 2016, the U.S. Supreme Court refused to allow Alaska an exemption for the Tongass National Forest from the Roadless Rule. This Forest Service rule limits road construction on designated national forest lands: "The 2001 Roadless Rule establishes prohibitions on road construction, road reconstruction, and timber harvesting on 58.5 million acres of inventoried roadless areas on National Forest System lands. The intent of the 2001 Roadless Rule is to provide lasting protection for inventoried roadless areas within the National Forest System in the context of multiple-use management." SEACC, together with Earthjustice and the Natural Resources Defense Council, advocated on behalf of the Tongass National Forest and challenged the State of Alaska.

Other core campaigns include mining watchdog work and a push for cleaner marine fuel use by large vessels in Alaska waters SEACC web site.

== Awards and achievements ==
SEACC received the National Conservation Achievement Award in 1990 for "Outstanding Contributions to the Wise Use & Management of the Nation's National Resources." The National Wildlife Federation gave it after successfully leading the Tongass Timber Reform Act campaign.

In 2012, former Executive Director of SEACC Lindsey Ketchel and Project Leader Dan Lesh received the Wilderness Partner of the Year award from the Forest Service for their wilderness steward trips with youth, native Alaskans, volunteers, and agency staff to Stikine Admiralty, and Chichagof Island Wilderness areas. They also cleaned up trash and waste and conducted invasive plant control on Admiralty Island.
