= Yanakuna =

Class of people in the former territories of the Inca Empire

Yanakuna were originally individuals in the Inca Empire who left the ayllu system and worked full-time at a variety of tasks for the Inca, the quya (Inca queen), or the religious establishment. A few members of this serving class enjoyed high social status and were appointed officials by the Sapa Inca. They could own property and sometimes had their own farms, before and after the conquest. The Spanish continued the yanakuna tradition developing it further as yanakuna entered Spanish service as Indian auxiliaries or encomienda Indians.

== Etymology and spelling ==
The word yana in Quechua, the main Inca language, means black, servant, and is possibly derived from the verb yanapa to help, Qosqo Quechua, yana, black, servant, partner, spouse, and paramour. The -kuna suffix in yanakuna indicates the plural, thus if yana is translated as "servant" yanakuna is "servants" or "slaves". Hispanicized spellings of yanakuna are yanacona and yanaconas.

== Inca Empire ==
In the Inca Empire yanakuna was the name of the servants to the Inca elites. The word servant, however, is misleading about the identity and function of the yanakuna. They were not forced to work as slaves. Some were born into the category of yanakuna (like many other professions, it was a hereditary one), some chose to leave ayllus to work, and some were selected by nobles. They were to care for the herds of the nobles, do fishing, and were dedicated to other work, like the making of pottery, construction, and domestic service. Yanakuna were sometimes given high positions in the Inca government. Mitma is a term commonly associated with yanakuna, but its meaning is different, as the mitmaqkuna were used as labor for large projects. Yanakuna were specifically not a part of an ayllu and were relocated individually instead of in large labor groups. An example of the differences of the classes is that mitmaqkuna were labor that built Machu Picchu, but yanakuna lived and served the Inca there.

In Chile, the mapuche used this word to refer to alleged "traitors of their race". The concept of traitor was unknown to them, so when asked to translate the word from Spanish they referred to the Spanish native auxiliaries.

== Spanish Empire ==
When the Spanish conquistadors arrived in modern-day Peru, the yanakuna assisted the Spaniards to take control of the empire. These people had their names used by the Spaniards, during the Spanish conquest of the Inca Empire, as one for the indigenous people they had in servitude, in encomiendas, or in military forces as indios auxiliares (Indian auxiliaries).

After the conquest, as craftworkers and laborers, the yanakuna played a significant role in a variety of both rural and urban production sectors in Peru's colonial economy.

=== First decades of colonization ===
The Spanish initially exacted tribute from the indigenous peoples of Peru through the ayllu-based encomienda system, by which native subjects were forced to contribute labor and goods (increasingly in the form of silver money) in service of the Spanish crown. Yanakuna, however, were separate from this system of obligation, and often performed different tasks. While the indios de encomienda fulfilled the most menial jobs in the Potosi silver mines, for example, yanakuna served as skilled artisans. Some yanakuna did work in the mines themselves from their beginnings in the 1540s, but unlike the indios de encomienda, they worked as free wage laborers.

=== Yanakuna in mining and the mita ===
Under the reforms imposed by Viceroy Francisco de Toledo (1569-1581), a system of draft labor known as the mita came to replace the encomienda system, by which villages within a several-hundred mile radius around Potosi had to send around one seventh of their male tribute-age population (from ages 18 to 50) each year to work in the mines. This change in labor organization occurred for a number of reasons: the Crown's explicitly stated preference for Peru to emphasize silver export and advances in mining technology increase the demand for labor; at the same time, the imposition of the mita allowed the Crown to push against the power of the encomenderos (Spanish recipients of encomienda grants), and offer native labor to non-encomenderos in Peru.

With this shift, yanakuna retained their place within the colonial economy of labor, and even grew in importance. As indios de encomienda decreased in number at Potosi, yanakuna increased. And, though mitayos (mita labor draftees) filled an important role in completing tasks undesirable to free laborers, they did not constitute a majority of laborers at Potosi – in 1603, for example, only 5,100 Indians out of 58,800 working at Potosi were mitayos. The proportion of mitayos continued to decrease through the seventeenth century, as the proportion of yanakuna increased: in the latter half of the sixteenth century, yanakuna constituted less than 10% of tribute paying subjects, while they constituted about 40% of this population in the latter half of the seventeenth century.

A 1601 order from the Crown stated a preference for voluntary labor; indeed, though the yanakuna may have been bound as servants, historian Raquel Gil Montero suggests that after the Toledo reforms, the tribute-paying yanakuna at Potosi could be considered "free laborers." It was to the natives' advantage to work for market-rate wages as a free laborer (as opposed to the below market-rate wages of the mitayos), considering the expectation of tribute in money form.

=== In other economic sectors and labor arrangements ===
As Spanish settlers brought European agriculture to Peru, yanakuna labor supplemented that of mita draftees on farms. In this context, "yanakuna" referred to laborers who permanently resided at their place of employment. As an alternative to mita draftees, Spaniards preferred yanakuna were to African slaves, as the former were familiar with both indigenous and European methods, and did not need to be purchased. As in the mines, yanakuna labor in some areas represented a significant proportion of the labor force. The historian Steve J. Stern has written that Spanish colonials in the Huamanga region of Peru increasingly depended on contracted yanakuna labor as the mita labor draft became less reliable, especially for less politically influential settlers (in part due to resistance and evasion from within ayllus, as well as indigenous population decline). This was the case not only in farming and mining, but also in ranching and manufactures.

In these contract relationships, a yanakuna promised labor services to a master in exchange for subsistence, as well as land and credit. Labor arrangements mimicking this yanakuna form – separate from the natives' ayllus – proliferated through the early seventeenth century, as Spanish employers sought to secure a labor force. In some cases, factory owners brought laborers from their ayllus to reside in situ like yanakuna; in others, contracts with free wage laborers came to resemble yanakuna contracts in their duration and reciprocal guarantees. What Stern calls "yanacona-like" relationships developed as a way for Indian workers to repay debts to a Spanish employer. And, due to labor demand, Spaniard's sometimes sought to convince Indians to voluntarily enter yanakuna contracts on farms with attractive wage offers. The need for coercion to secure labor indeed decreased, as the monetization of tribute, the associated integration of a commercial economy, and the burdens of the mita made ayllus less self-sufficient, and induced Indian members to seek subsistence beyond.

Though separate from their ayllus, yanakuna were not completely dislocated from community. Many still owned land, and some of those working on farms lived there with families. In general, like other colonial-era migrants, yanakuna moved with their families and spouses.

In urban areas, yanakuna owned and passed down real estate. Unlike many other urban Indian laborers bound in servitude, often in domestic work, urban yanakuna maintained a more privileged status working as skilled craftspeople. Here, they were also distinguished by their comparably greater degree of acculturation to Spanish custom and language. Some scholars argue that this integration into urban colonial society by yanakuna actually represented an extension into a new context of older Andean practices of migration meant to fulfill different ecological niches.

The term yanakuna also was used during the conquest of Chile and other areas of South America, like the New Kingdom of Granada.

== Modern use ==
In modern times people in Chile use "yanacona" as an insult for Mapuches considered to have betrayed their people. Use of the word "yanacona" to describe people in the press has led to legal action in Chile. Héctor Llaitul, leader of the militant organization Coordinadora Arauco-Malleco, has declared that those Mapuche who work for forestry companies are "yanaconas".

== See also ==
- Indios reyunos
- Indios amigos
- Yanacona language

== Sources ==
- Ann M. Wightman, Indigenous Migration and Social Change: The Forasteros of Cuzco, 1570–1720, Duke University Press, 1990, ISBN 0822310007. pp. 16–18
- Translation of Spanish Wikipedia Page
- The Inca and Aztec States 1400–1800. Anthropology and History by George A. Collier; Renato I. Rosaldo; John D. Wirth.
- Childress, D. (2000). "Who's who in Inca society". Calliope, 10(7), 14.
- Malpass, M. A. (1996). Daily life in the inca empire. (pp. 55). Greenwood Publishing Group.
- Bethany L. Turner, George D. Kamenov, John D. Kingston, George J. Armelagos, "Insights into immigration and social class at Machu Picchu, Peru based on oxygen, strontium, and lead isotopic analysis", Journal of Archaeological Science, Volume 36, Issue 2, February 2009, pp. 317–332, ISSN 0305-4403, doi:10.1016/j.jas.2008.09.018.
- Stern, S. J. (1982). Peru's Indian peoples and the challenge of Spanish conquest. (pp. 30–55). Madison: University of Wisconsin Press.
