= Fortress of the Bear =

Non-profit bear refuge in Sitka, Alaska

- Fortress of the Bear logo

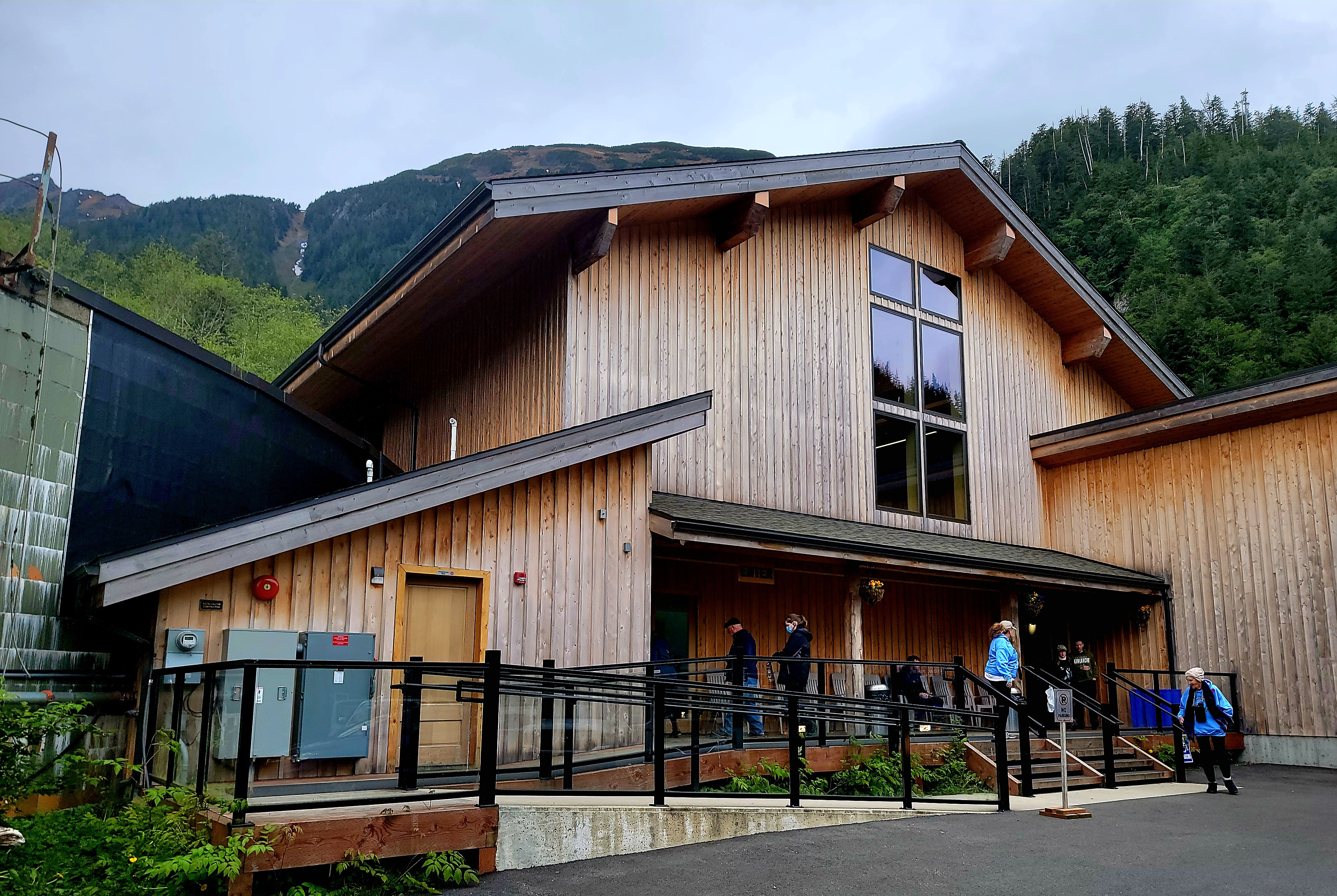
- Fortress of the Bear in 2024
- Formation: 2003; 23 years ago
- Founders: Les Kinnear; Evy Kinnear
- Founded at: Sitka, Alaska
- Type: Nonprofit
- Registration no.: 41-2064376
- Purpose: Bear refuge
- Headquarters: 4639 Sawmill Creek Road
- Location: Sitka, Alaska, United States
- Coordinates: 57°03′02″N 135°13′59″W
- Website: www.fortressofthebear.org

The Fortress of the Bear is a non-profit bear refuge and education center in Sitka, Alaska. It was established in 2003 by Les and Evy Kinnear at the Gary Paxton Industrial Park, which previously housed the Sitka Pulp Mill.

Sitka conservation organizations opposed the Kinnears' plan to open a refuge, believing that wild bears should not be confined in tanks and shown to the public. To convince the authorities that they could properly care for animals, the Kinnears started raising pigs and other farm animals at the location. After several years of work, the refuge received all the necessary state and city permits. The sanctuary began housing its first brown bear, Killisnoo, in 2007, and its first black bear, Smokey, in 2013. The refuge was visited by 20 percent of cruise ship passengers who docked in Sitka in 2016. By its 10th anniversary in 2017 of housing bears, three black bears and five brown bears lived there. By 2017, it had 30,000 yearly visitors and made $1 million in annual revenue.

== History ==
=== Conception and preparation ===
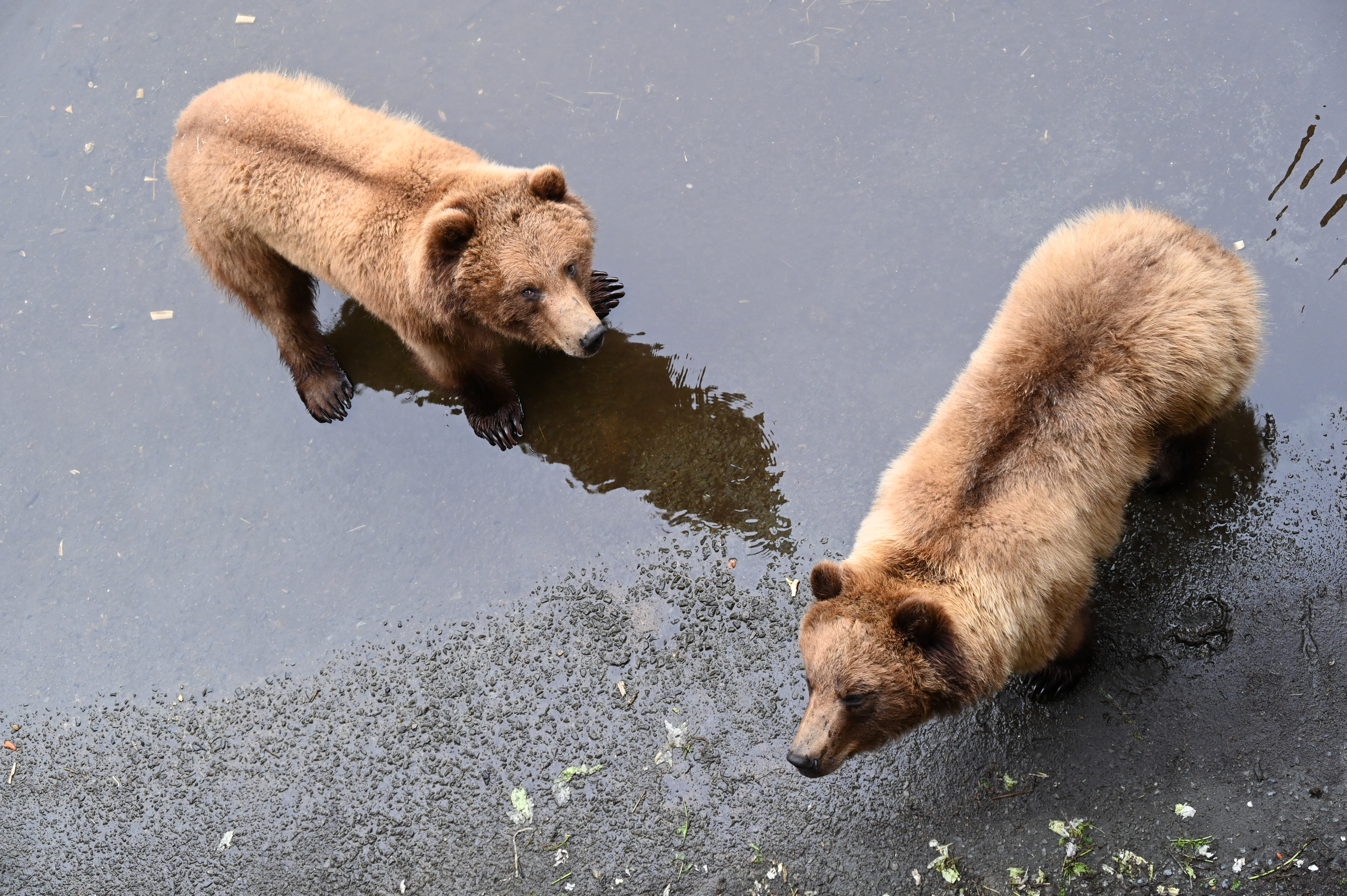
Two brown bears at the sanctuary in 2022

Fortress of the Bear founders and husband-and-wife duo Les and Evy Kinnear became acquainted with each other in Portland, Oregon. Evy had previously been a Los Angeles middle school teacher in math and science before becoming her mother's caretaker in Portland. Having been for numerous years a hunting guide, Les had gone bear hunting and killed other large quarry in the Alaska Range. Having been an Alaskan resident starting in 1978, he had planned to relocate to Portland. Les Kinnear decided to stay in Alaska in Sitka after Evy saw the bear sanctuary as a venture worth doing and pledged her support. In 2002, the couple began making arrangements for opening a bear refuge.

In 2003, Les Kinnear created Kootznahoo, a non-profit organization, to serve as a sanctuary for bears from Southeast Alaska. He received approval from the City and Borough of Sitka whose Sitka Assembly presented Kootznahoo with $25,000 to implement the proposal. The money came from federal funds allocated to Sitka in the 1990s with the aim of spurring economic growth. The city owned Gary Paxton Industrial Park, the land that used to house Sitka Pulp Mill, a pulp mill that had been closed in 1993, and had trouble finding leaseholders for the vacant property. Located on Silver Bay, the mill is 6 miles (9.7 km) from Sitka's downtown. In 2003, the city signed a lease with Kootznahoo that lasted 10 years allowing him to use it to house bears. The pulp mill had two barrel-shaped concrete tanks that were once used for industrial wastewater treatment. Each tank had a diameter of 192 feet (59 m). The two tanks had heights of 12 and 14 feet (3.7 and 4.3 m), respectively. Kinnear planned to house the bears in the tanks. Aiming to mimick the bears' native habitat, he planned to add water and greenery to furnish the receptacles.

After the state of Alaska asked her to evaluate the proposal, the bear expert and Houston Zoo handler Diana Weinhardt visited the site and concluded it was achievable. Regarding the bear sanctuary proposal, the Alaska Department of Fish and Game said it was "very noncommittal". The agency mandated that Kootznahoo must demonstrate over 12 months its ability to nurture animals there. Only after the organization did this would the agency approve or deny the permit that would allow housing of bears. To address the department's prerequisite, Kinnear chose to take care of pigs at the pulp mill for that year. He stated that pigs are similar to bears in being omnivores and in having the strength to flee negligent keepers. The Alaska Department of Fish and Game agreed to his proposal. After raising pigs at the Sawmill Farm, he began raising other farm animals including chickens, ducks, goats, sheep, rabbits, and turkeys. People from Sitka purchased chickens and eggs from his farm. His farm and a petting zoo were located in one of the pulp mill's tanks. The farm received produce donations from grocery stores to feed the animals. Fishermen took pink salmon to the farm, while the credit union provided fragmented paper as their bedding. By 2005, the Kinnears had invested $40,000 to create the farm and petting zoo and prepare the location for housing bears. To fund the project, Evy Kinnear ran a Sitka embroidery store.

The bear sanctuary received opposition from Sitka conservation organizations. Carrie Bosman, a Sitka resident and the Center for Biological Diversity's Alaska program director, said, "I think it's a moral question. For me, it is unfair to take a bear that is wild and used to large open spaces and isolate it in a confined tank." She stated that it was more compassionate to euthanize the bears rather than put the animals up for public view. Jim Faro, a Sitka resident and former Alaska Department of Fish and Game biologist, said, "I think they will find it extremely expensive to modify (the mill site) into anything other than a substandard holding facility." He argued that the bear sanctuary could help a small number of bears. Citing the city garbage being easily accessible to bears, he said the government should spend its resources exploring solutions that addressed human and bear conflicts. People wrote letters to the governor of Alaska opposing the project.

The Alaska Department of Environmental Conservation conducted an analysis of the soil surrounding the waste tanks, confirming that there was a small pollution rate. Regarding the use of the tanks for housing bears, Bill Janes, an official with the government agency, said, "We do not feel any contamination in and around those clarifier tanks pose any sort of problem."

=== Opening and operation ===
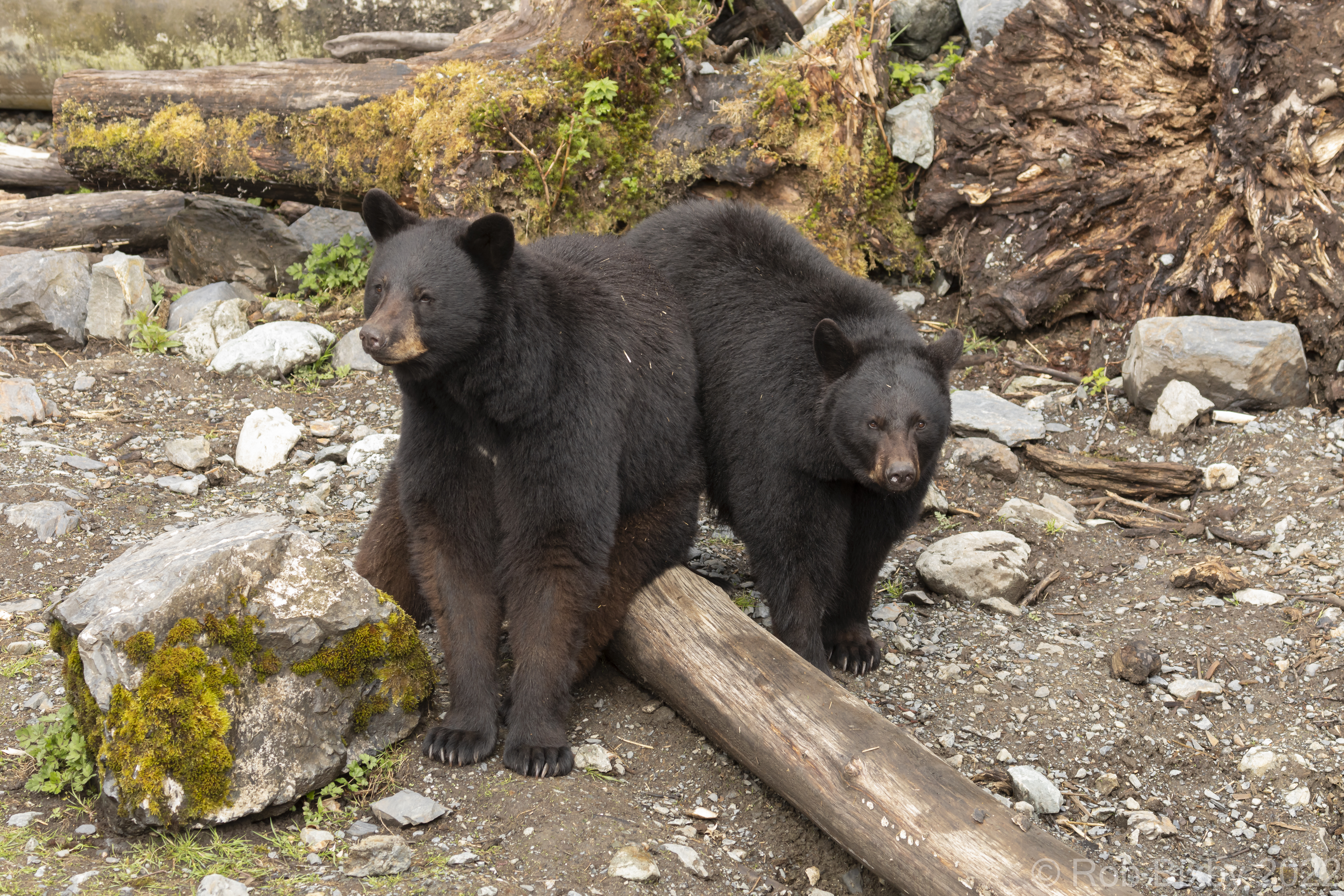
Two black bears at the refuge in 2022

After a few years of work, the refuge received all of the requisite city and state permits to operate the bear refuge. The Star Tribune's Beth Dooley called Fortress of the Bear "the world's first bear-cub orphanage". It is a sanctuary for rescued famished bears who have grown so accustomed to humans that they cannot be released back to the wild. Fortress of the Bear serves as a non-profit education organization that teaches people human-animal interaction. The refuge hosts demonstrations for schoolchildren in which fried chicken is planted in tents and brown bears tear up the tents to find the food. To ensure the bears do not mate in confinement, the male bears are sterilized during their youth.

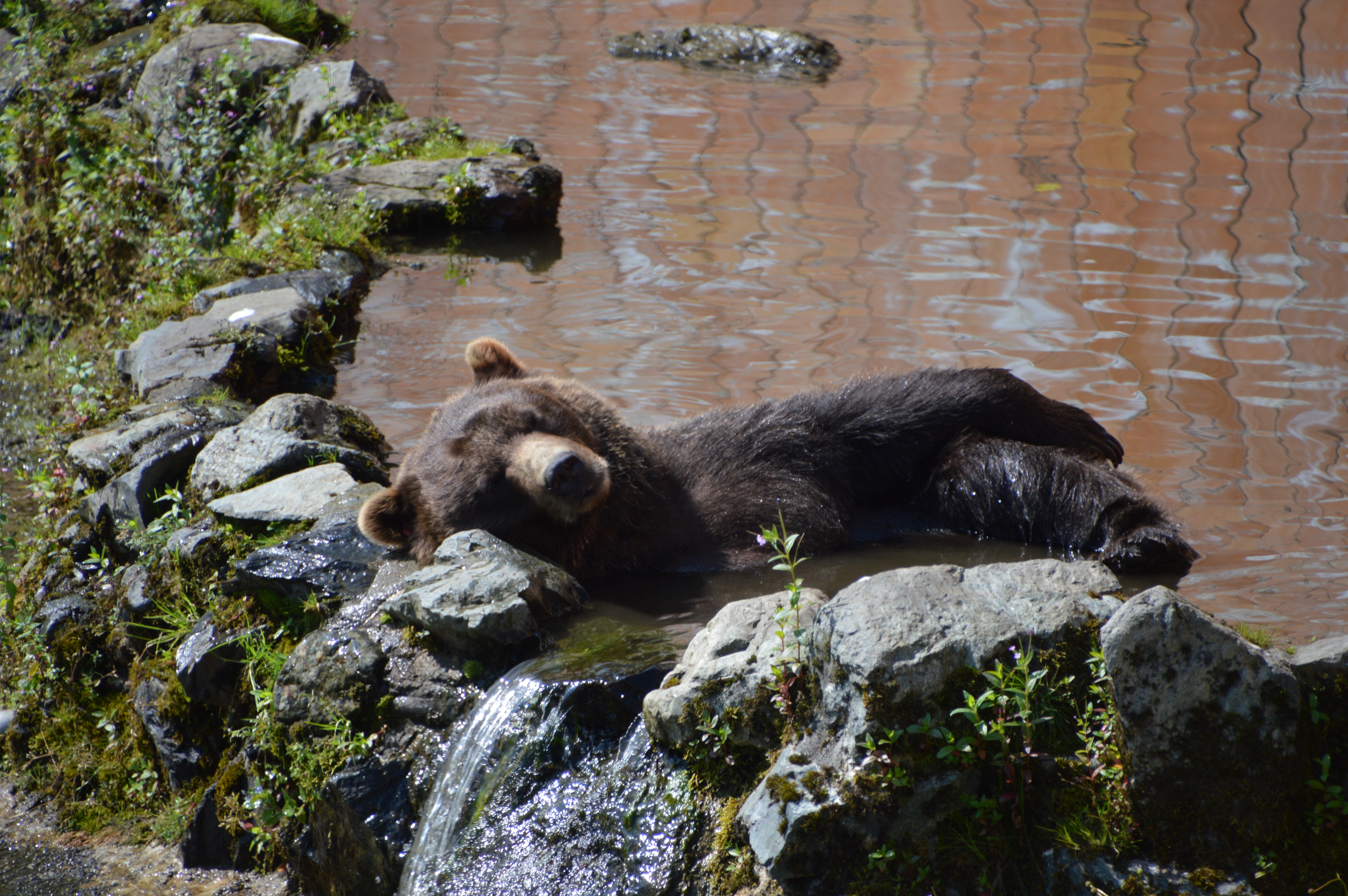
A bear at the center relaxing in the sun.

In 2016, the refuge was paying a monthly rent of $50 to the city. That year, the refuge had sheltered 13 bears in total. It was able to find new homes for five of those bears in zoos in Montana, New York, and Texas. Co-founder Les Kinnear said in 2016 that to build and maintain the refuge, he had spent close to $400,000 of his funds and sweat equity. At its 10th anniversary in July 2017, three black bears and five brown bears lived at the refuge. They drew 30,000 yearly visitors, making the refuge $1 million in annual revenue. Although the refuge in 2017 was full so could not accommodate more long-term residents, it was allowed to briefly house more bears. That year, the Sitka Assembly authorized a modification of the lease to include part of the hill for the bears' living space. Fortress of the Bear built a 4,000 sq ft (370 m^{2}) structure to house brown bears and expanded it by ten times in 2018 to accommodate their growth. During the bears' hibernation, the refuge constructed a larger living area for the black bears in 2018. Housing a creek in the rear, it has spruce, salmonberry shrubs, and alders.

A viewing platform overlooks the bears' living quarters, which is filled with water, trees, barrels, and swings. In 2016, the Kinnears planned a 40 percent expansion to the platform since the increase in visitors over the years had made it crowded. Naturalists stationed on the platform share information about the bears who can be observed wrestling and swimming. The refuge built a visitor center with an estimated cost of $1 million. It houses a gift shop, viewing places on both the bottom floor and top floor, and a classroom. Fortress of the Bear hosts a Bear Awareness Day every year in June in which visitors are given tips about staying safe during bear interactions and about electric fences and bear spray. In a demonstration during the event, the brown bears are given access to a waste bin built to withstand bears. Despite clawing, biting, and stomping on the cans, the bears are unable to breach the bins.

When the bears hibernate in the winter, the refuge closes. It is open between May and September. In 2016, about 20 percent of cruise ship passengers who dock in Sitka stop by the Fortress of the Bear.

== Bears ==
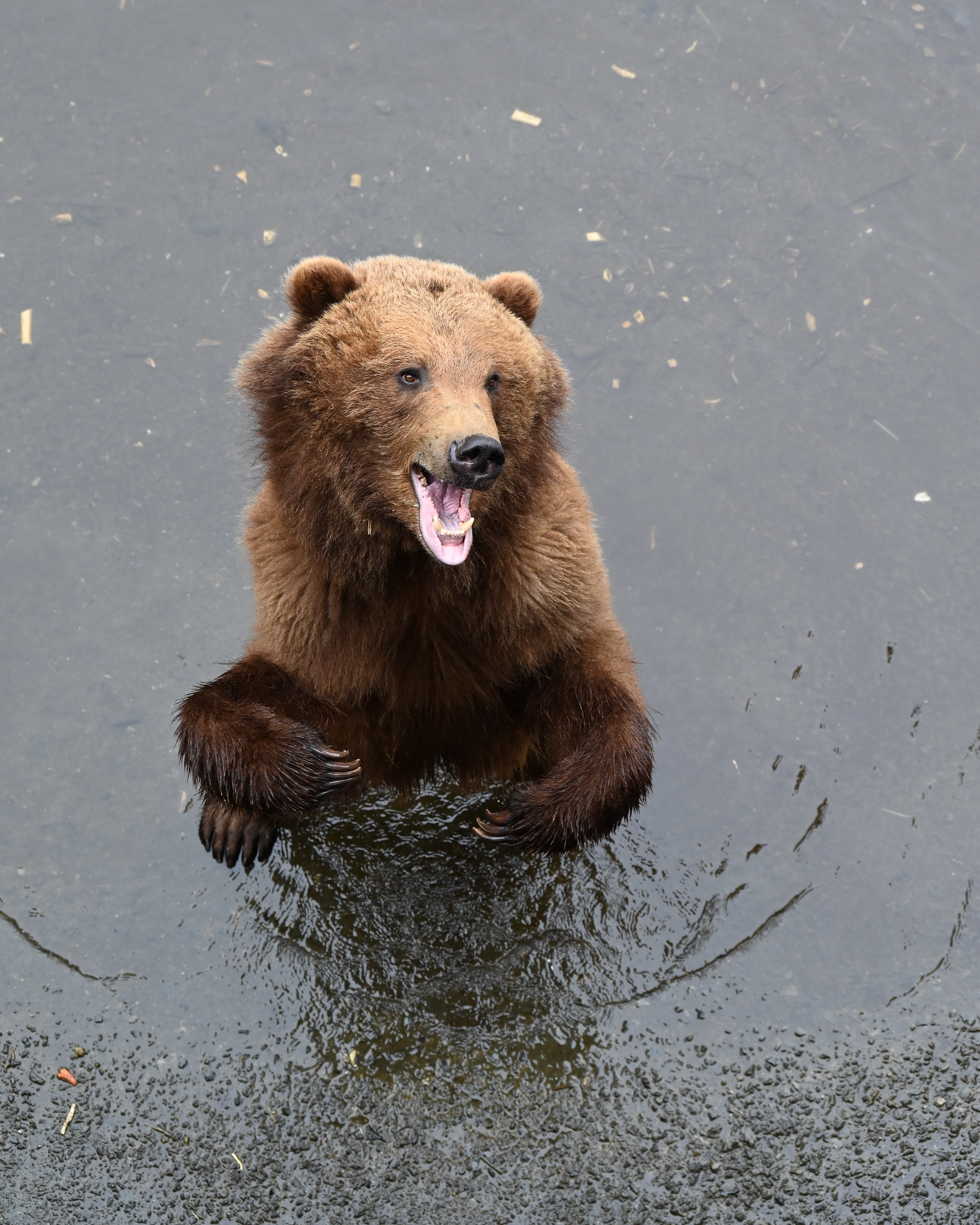
A brown bear at the sanctuary in 2022

On July 27, 2007, the refuge adopted the brown bear Killisnoo, its first cub. At seven months old and 52 pounds (24 kg), he had been rescued by the Alaska Department of Fish and Game in Angoon and was the runt. After Killisnoo's mother had accompanied a cook into a fishing inn's gallery, she had been killed. Several months afterwards, his sister Chaik joined him at the refuge after being captured. They were joined by other brown bears several years later. After the Sitka police received 70 to 80 bear complaints at the beginning of August 2009, the Alaska Department of Fish and Game used tranquilizers from a dart gun to capture three brown bear cubs. The Fortress of the Bear agreed to temporarily house the bears on August 16, 2009. The Bronx Zoo accepted three brown bears from the Fortress of the Bear in 2009. In 2011, the refuge was housing in one clarifier three two-year-old brown bear siblings, Toby, Balloo and Lucky, and two other bears in a neighboring clarifier (Killisnoo and Chaik).

A female brown bear cub named Pandora temporarily stayed at the refuge for a few weeks in mid-2011 before being relocated to Montana Grizzly Encounter. For its show Expedition Wild, National Geographic filmed Kinnear's and the naturalist Casey Anderson's interactions with Pandora. A nine-month-old 25-pound (11 kg) female black bear named Smokey joined the sanctuary on October 25, 2013. In Seward, Spring Creek Correctional Center workers had found her consuming cigarette butts which led the orphaned cub to be named Smokey. After she was caught on October 16, 2013, by Alaska State Troopers, a social media campaign asked the Department of Fish and Game not to kill the bear, and the refuge agreed to adopt her. To train her not to worry about scarcity in food, Les Kinnear gave her pieces of apples and dry dog food several times throughout the day. Since Smokey was the refuge's first black bear, the refuge needed to construct a second area to house her. The existing area, which housed brown bears, was insufficient as it was too small and would be dangerous for the bears. In November 2013, Smokey was joined by a second black bear cub, Bandit, who was transported in from Juneau. Tuliaan, Smokey's sister, joined her at the refuge on December 17, 2013, after people found her at the same place Smokey had been found. Tuliaan means "gentle" in Tlingit.

The seven-year-old brown bear Balloo, whose namesake was a favorite character of Kinnear's in The Jungle Book, was euthanized in October 2017 after he could no longer move his hind legs. Killisnoo was euthanized in May 2020 after refuge workers found he had trouble moving.

== Reception ==
Midland Reporter-Telegram journalist Kay Crites wrote, "It was a little sad to see the bears kept in large circular areas surrounded by concrete walls." Noting that the Department of Fish and Game frequently euthanizes cubs whose mothers have died, she found that the refuge had saved the bears' lives. The Manchester Evening News's Kate Fielder said, "It was amazing to watch these bears play as eagles soared above."

Seth Rudetsky wrote, "The place was incredible ... but also so extremely sad because they gave us the back stories on each cub ... I got an amazing video of the bears playing with a ball that they spin around in the water and every so often, food comes out of it." Author Erin Kirkland wrote, "If you're going to see bears at other southeast Alaska destinations or elsewhere in the state, I'd skip this frankly. But if seeing brown bears up close is a must-do for your family, then stop. The bears are acclimated to their human family and can be quite funny when asking for a fish snack, much to the delight of youngsters in the crowd."
