= Clean Water Protection Act =

The Clean Water Protection Act (H.R. 1310) was a bill introduced in the 111th United States Congress via the House of Representatives Subcommittee on Water Resources and Environment, of the Committee on Transportation and Infrastructure. It proposed to redefine "fill material" to not include mining "waste" under the Federal Water Pollution Control Act.

It was introduced by Frank Pallone and Chris Shays in the 110th Congress, and almost identical bills had been introduced in previous years. As of July 2009, H.R.1310 had 154 co-sponsors. Environmental groups such as Appalachian Voices, Kentuckians for the Commonwealth and Sierra Club supported the legislation because of their stance against mountaintop removal mining. It would also have affected situations similar to the Kensington Mine operation near Juneau, Alaska where a mine was permitted to discharge mining waste into a small lake as "fill."

| Congress | Short title | Bill number(s) | Date introduced | Sponsor(s) | # of cosponsors | Latest status |
|---|---|---|---|---|---|---|
| 107th Congress | Clean Water Protection Act | H.R. 4683 | June 8, 2002 | Frank Pallone (D-NJ) | 36 | Died in committee |
| 108th Congress | Clean Water Protection Act | H.R. 738 | February 12, 2003 | Frank Pallone (D-NJ) | 64 | Died in committee |
| 109th Congress | Clean Water Protection Act | H.R. 2719 | May 26, 2005 | Frank Pallone (D-NJ) | 76 | Died in committee |
| 110th Congress | Clean Water Protection Act | H.R. 2169 | May 3, 2007 | Frank Pallone (D-NJ) | 152 | Died in committee |
| 111th Congress | Clean Water Protection Act | H.R. 1310 | March 4, 2009 | Frank Pallone (D-NJ) | 172 | Died in committee |
| 112th Congress | Clean Water Protection Act | H.R. 1375 | April 5, 2011 | Frank Pallone (D-NJ) | 131 | Died in committee |
| 113th Congress | Clean Water Protection Act | H.R. 1837 | May 6, 2013 | Frank Pallone (D-NJ) | 94 | Died in committee |
| 114th Congress | Clean Water Protection Act | H.R. 6411 | November 30, 2016 | Frank Pallone (D-NJ) | 0 | Died in committee |

== See also ==
- Clean Water Act
- Coeur Alaska, Inc. v. Southeast Alaska Conservation Council
