= Empresa Minera Manquiri =

Bolivian mining company

- Type: Private – S.A.
- Industry: Mining
- Headquarters: Potosí, Bolivia
- Products: Silver, tin
- Parent: Andean Precious Metals Corp.

Minera Manquiri or Empresa Minera Manquiri (lit. "Manquiri Mining Enterprise") is a Bolivian silver and tin mining company. The company owns one mine, San Bartolomé in Cerro Rico and one mineral processing plant. It was a subsidiary of the U.S.-based company Coeur D’Alen until 2018 when it was sold to Andean Precious Metals Corp. In the San Bartolomé mine Empresa Minera Manquiri mines low-grade polymetallic ores containing silver and tin.

In 2011 the company contributed to the establishment of the Potosí Silversmithing School as part of an industrialization effort, and has since then become a supplier of high-grade silver (99.96%) to the school.

In 2012 the company was in the center of a controversy as deputy Gardenia Arauz accused that, the previous year, the then-president of the lower chamber, Héctor Arce, had attempted to dissuade her from inspecting alleged tax evasion at Empresa Minera Manquiri.

Empresa Minera Manquiri has carried out exploration for gold in Río Blanco south of Potosí.
