= Lower Slate Lake =

Lake in the state of Alaska, United States

- Location within Alaska Location within North America
- Location: Tongass National Forest, Juneau City and Borough, Alaska, United States
- Coordinates: 58°48′36″N 135°02′26″W
- Basin countries: United States

Lower Slate Lake is a lake in the State of Alaska in the Tongass National Forest. It is designated as the disposal site for the tailings from Coeur Alaska's Kensington mine. Lower Slate Lake is 1.38 miles (2.22 km) away from Berners Bay.

== See also ==
- Coeur Alaska, Inc. v. Southeast Alaska Conservation Council
