= Ward Cove =

Bay in the U.S. state of Alaska

Coordinates: 55.40138999°N 131.7288900°W

Ward Cove is a bay in the U.S. state of Alaska. It is situated about 5 miles (8.0 km) to the westward of Ketchikan off the western coast of Revillagigedo Island within the Alexander Archipelago. The town of Ward Cove (also Wacker, Wacker City, or Wards Cove) is located on the waterway. It is a small bay on the northern shore of Tongass Narrows. Ward Cove Stream empties into the head of the cove, and is the outlet to a chain of lakes. It flows in a fairly straight course in a southerly direction over rocky bottom, with a rapid current throughout its length, between high bluff banks well wooded. Tide water extends a short distance within the mouth. The stream water is fairly clear. It is about .75 miles (1.21 km) long, and 300 feet (91 m) below the lake, has a width of 20 feet (6.1 m) and a depth of 0.75 feet (0.23 m), and a 3-knot current.

The north shore of the cove was formerly home to the Ketchikan Pulp Company pulp mill, which was built in 1957 to process timber from the Tongass National Forest into wood pulp. The mill was closed in 1997 and has largely been demolished. As of 2013, the site was being redeveloped into an industrial park, including a boatyard and the headquarters for the Alaska Marine Highway.
