= Coeur Alaska, Inc. v. Southeast Alaska Conservation Council =

- Supreme Court of the United States

Argued January 12, 2009 Decided June 22, 2009
- Full case name: Coeur Alaska, Inc., Petitioner v. Southeast Alaska Conservation Council, et al.
- Docket no.: 07-984
- Citations: 557 U.S. 261 (more) 129 S. Ct. 2458; 174 L. Ed. 2d 193

Case history
- Prior: Summary judgment granted, CV-05-00012-J-JK (D. Alaska, 2005); reversed, 486 F.3d 638 (9th Cir. 2006); reversed and remanded.

Holding
- The Army Corps of Engineers was the appropriate agency to permit the disposal of mine waste material into Lower Slate Lake.

Court membership
- Chief Justice John Roberts Associate Justices John P. Stevens · Antonin Scalia; Anthony Kennedy · David Souter; Clarence Thomas · Ruth Bader Ginsburg; Stephen Breyer · Samuel Alito

Case opinions
- Majority: Kennedy, joined by Roberts, Thomas, Breyer, Alito; Scalia (in part)
- Concurrence: Breyer
- Concurrence: Scalia (in part)
- Dissent: Ginsburg, joined by Stevens, Souter

Laws applied
- Clean Water Act

Coeur Alaska, Inc. v. Southeast Alaska Conservation Council, 557 U.S. 261 (2009), is a United States Supreme Court case that was decided in favor of Coeur Alaska's permit to dump mine waste in a lake. The case addressed tailings from the Kensington mine, an underground mine located in Alaska. The gold mine had not operated since 1928, and Coeur Alaska obtained a permit in 2005 from the United States Army Corps of Engineers (USACE) to dispose of up to 4.5 million tons of tailings in Lower Slate Lake, which is located in a National Forest.

The suit was filed by three environmental non-governmental organizations and brought before the United States District Court for the District of Alaska who found in favor of Coeur Alaska. The District Court's decision was overturned by the U.S. 9th Circuit Court of Appeals before being brought before the Supreme Court, who also found in favor of Coeur Alaska.

The ruling was praised by the National Mining Association for the economic benefit it provided. Environmental groups criticised the decision for the impact it would have on Lower Slate Lake, and the opportunity for its use as a precedent in the future. In March 2009 proposed legislation, the Clean Water Protection Act, was introduced in Congress to remove mining waste from the definition of "fill material".

== Background ==
In 2005 Coeur Alaska Inc., a subsidiary of Coeur d'Alene Mines, successfully applied for a tailings disposal permit from the USACE. The permit allowed Coeur Alaska to dispose of 4.5 million tons of tailings from the Kensington gold mine, 45 mi (72 km) north of Juneau, into Lower Slate Lake. The mine operated in the early 20th century, but had been inactive since 1928. The lake is 3 miles (4.8 km) from the mine, within the Tongass National Forest.

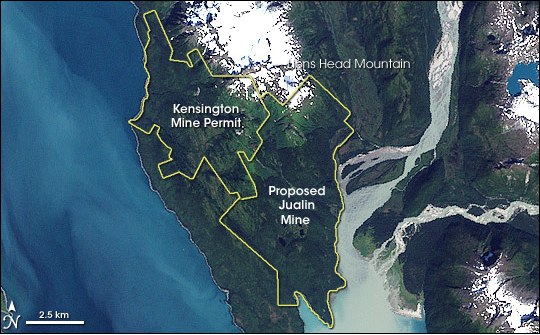
The boundary of the Kensington Mine Lease and the proposed Julian Mine.

The discharge of material into waters of the United States is regulated under the Clean Water Act by either the USACE or the Environmental Protection Agency (EPA), depending on what the material is. Discharge of "fill material" falls under the jurisdiction of the USACE; discharge of other pollutants falls under the jurisdiction of the EPA. In 2005 Coeur was granted a permit to dispose of tailings into Lower Slate Lake by the USACE under section 404 of the Clean Water Act. The decision was based on the definition of "fill material" which had been revised in 2002 under the administration of George W. Bush. This new definition allowed some contaminants to be included in mine waste and still be classified as fill. The permit allowed Coeur to dump 4.5 million tons of a combination of waste rock and tailings into Lower Slate Lake over a period of ten years, causing the floor elevation of the lake to rise by 50 ft (15 m).

After the USACE issued the permit, the Southeast Alaska Conservation Council, the Sierra Club, and Lynn Canal Conservation Inc. filed suit. The suit claimed that the permit was issued in violation of sections 301(a), 301(e), and 306(e) of the Clean Water Act. The United States District Court for the District of Alaska found that the USACE was correct in its application of section 404 of the act, because the permit was for "fill material", and therefore not covered under or in violation of sections 301(e) and 306(e).

In May 2007 the District Court's 2006 decision was overturned by the U.S. 9th Circuit Court of Appeals. The Circuit Court found in favor of the non-governmental organizations, ruling that discharge of tailings was not permitted under the EPA's New Source Performance Standard.

== Opinion of the Court ==
The Supreme Court found in favor of Coeur Alaska by a vote of 6–3, agreeing that the USACE is indeed the appropriate body to issue a permit to discharge mine waste into Lower Slate Lake. In her dissent, Justice Ruth Bader Ginsburg stated that currently discharging pollutants into a lake is permitted provided there is enough material to raise the lake's floor elevation, thereby turning it into a waste disposal site. Ginsburg voiced concern about the potential for pollution regulation to not apply to several industries (mining included) on the basis of this loophole.

== Subsequent developments ==
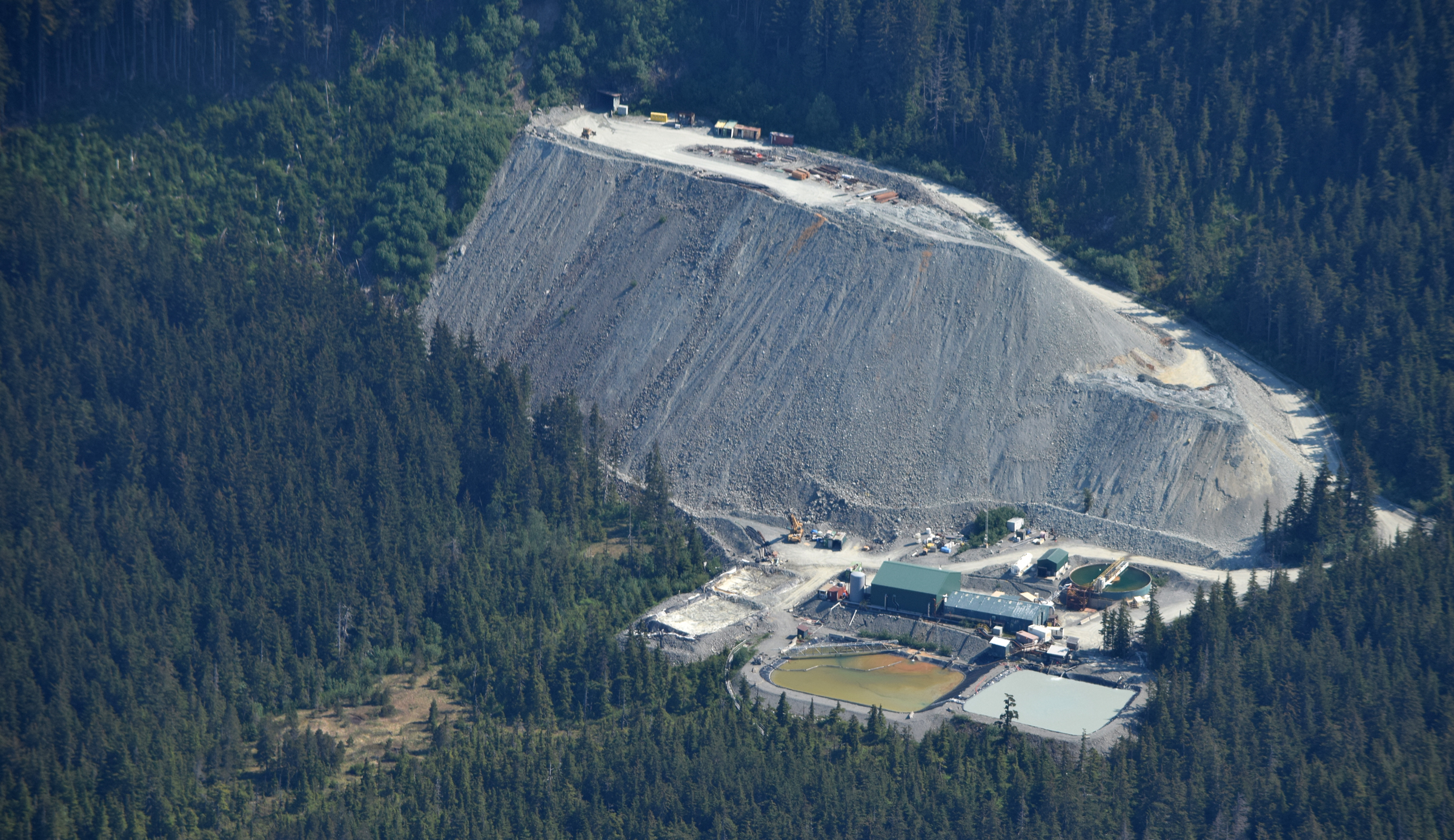
Aerial view of the Comet portal of the Kensington mine.

The decision was praised by the National Mining Association, which stated that it would "provide employment and greater economic certainty for all those involved in the project". Alaska Governor Sarah Palin also welcomed the ruling, calling it a "green light for responsible resource development". The environmental groups that originally filed suit against Coeur Alaska were unhappy with the decision. Environmental groups stated that the proposed material includes aluminum, lead, and mercury (among other metals), and that discharging into Lower Slate Lake will have a detrimental effect on the lake and surrounding waters. A representative from Earthjustice warned of the ruling being used as a precedent, allowing other companies to discharge pollutants into other rivers and lakes. Following the court's decision share prices of Coeur d'Alene Mines rose over 5%.

In March 2009 a bill, the Clean Water Protection Act, was introduced in Congress by Frank Pallone and Dave Reichert. The Clean Water Protection Act would have changed the definition of "fill material" in the Clean Water Act. Under the new definition "fill material" would have excluded mine waste.

== See also ==
- List of United States Supreme Court cases, volume 557
- List of United States Supreme Court cases
