= Tongass Timber Reform Act =

1990 act of the United States Congress

The Tongass Timber Reform Act (TTRA) is an act that was intended to amend the Alaska National Interest Lands Conservation Act (ANILCA), with the primary intention to increase the protection of the Tongass National Forest from logging. The TTRA was introduced on February 9, 1989, at the 101st Congress, 1989-1990, and was enacted when signed by President George H. W. Bush on November 28, 1990. as law (Pub.L. 101-626). Refer to the GovTrack.us website for the extended text of the bill. For a bill to become law in the United States it must be approved by both the House and the Senate, and signed by the President, who can veto the bill if they chose to. In response to required adjustments to the initial bill, a conference committee was formed, consisting of members from both the House and the Senate, tasked to produce a conference report on the necessary revisions and changes. This revised version of the bill was passed by both the Senate (Oct. 24 1990), with a vote of 99–0, and was approved by the House (Oct. 26, 1990). The sponsor for this bill was a representative from New York's 3rd congressional district, Robert Mrazek (Democrat).

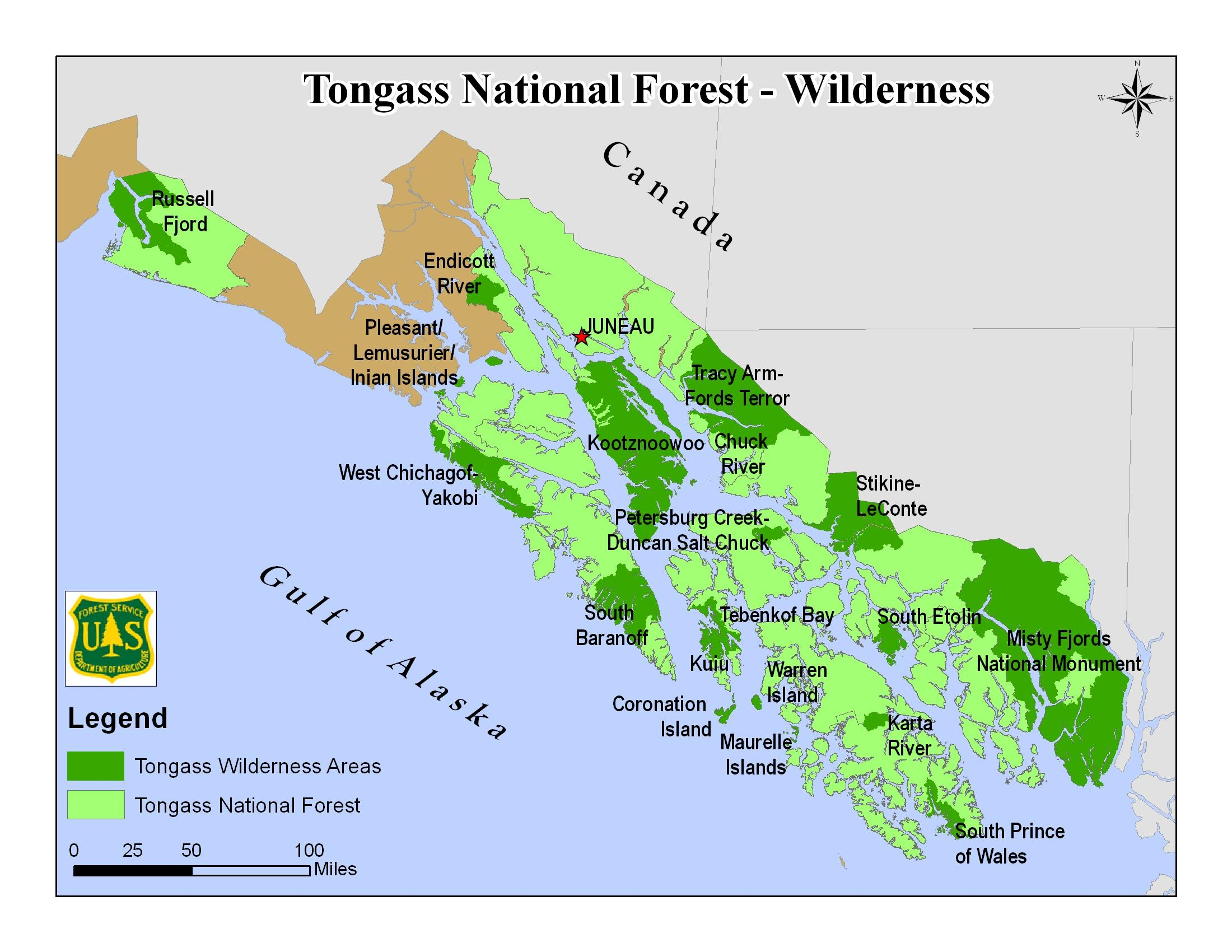
Forest Service map of the Tongass, with National Monuments and Wilderness Areas

== Background ==
The Tongass has been recognized by some as the largest, wettest, and wildest of the United States National Forests, with "soaring mountain peaks, narrow fjords, lush woods, and more than 1000 named islands." The Tongass encompasses most of Southeast Alaska, and was created in 1907 by President Theodore Roosevelt. With high concentrations of grizzly bears and bald eagles, this forest provides a haven for a diversity of wildlife. For the commercially important industry of salmon fishing, the Tongass plays an important role as well, as 90% of salmon in Southeast Alaska spawn within the territory of the Tongass National Forest. It has become a growing destination for passing tourists, and supports a traditional subsistence lifestyle for many communities. John Muir, the founder of the Sierra Club, and by many seen as the grandfather of the American National Parks, called the Tongass a place of "endless rhythm and beauty. Between 1954 and 1990 approximately 70% of the productive old-growth had been harvested. Prior to the enactment of the TTRA, clear cut logging of old-growth still took place in the Tongass National Forest, the only forest in the US where this method of forest management still existed. Continuation of similar rates of deforestation would have led to a large reduction in suitable habitat of the Sitka black-tailed deer, an important resource for subsistence hunting. Projections for the forest calculated prior to the TTRA, estimated that the timber harvests of the Tongass, and its consequential impacts on future employment, did not yield promising results for the logging industry. Disruptions were forecasted to local communities and a gross decline in profitable timber if the management approach by the Forest Service was not changed.

=== ANILCA ===
Signed in on November 12th 1980 by President Carter, ANILCA exempted the Tongass National Forest from complying to the provisions of section 6 (k) of the National Forest Management Act of 1976. This opened the Tongass to logging contracts that would have otherwise been unprofitable. Under In section 705 (a) of ANILCA, The Forest Service was legally required to make 4.5 billion board feet of the raw wood available to timber harvesting, on a decadal cycle. This resulted in the removal of market demands of timber, eliminating economic competition for those companies that held a contract with the Forest Service the timber industry. Because of this guarantee, any fluctuations in market demands of timber would be inconsequential in determining how much timber the pulp companies were able to harvest and sell. The recorded public response to ANILCA was an opinion that the United States government was engaging in "senseless deforestation." From 1982 to 1988, it was estimated that roughly $386,003,000 was spent by the United States federal government on the preparation and sale of the Tongass Forest timber. This sum was calculated by the Southeast Alaska Conservation Council (SEACC). The receipts of the timber sales for that period that the federal government released, total $32,427,432, resulting in an approximate net loss of $353,575,568 for the national treasury. There are disputes as to the specific costs that the federal government carried in incentivizing industrial production in the Tongass National Forest. None of the calculations could reveal a positive return to the US national treasury from the timber harvest of the Tongass National Forest.

=== Pulp Contracts ===
Many companies entered into timber contracts in Southeast Alaska during the post-World War II boom, however only two contracts remained by the time the TTRA was passed. In 1951 the United States federal government signed a contract with the Ketchikan Pulp Company (KPC) to authorize the harvest of 8.25 billion board feet of timber within a 50-year period from the Tongass National Forest. The second contract was between the Alaska Pulp Corporation (APC) and the United States, signed in 1956, authorizing the harvest of 4.975 billion board feet for the next fifty years. Both mills have been key to local economy, and were for a time the largest employer in Southeast Alaska. The funding by the United States government of the timber industry was intended as a strategy to increase the population of Southeast Alaska by creating more employment opportunities. About half the timber harvest was used primarily to produce dissolvable pulp, a raw material used in the production of rayon and cellophane. These long-term contract holders pay a much lower stumpage fee for the Tongass timber, than standard businesses holding short-term timber contracts. The logging mills have been able to make a profit from the Tongass timber, due to the subsidies provided by the federal government.

=== Support for the TTRA ===
The existence of the TTRA is in part due to specific Southeast Alaskans lobbying Congress in Washington D.C. Another important player in the creation of the TTRA were local conservation organizations including the Sitka Conservation Society and the Southeast Alaska Conservation Council (SEACC). The legislation was supported by the Salmon Bay Protective Association which brought in fish canneries and other fishing organizations such as the Alaska Trollers Association, the United Southeast Gillnetters Association, the Petersburg Vessel Owners, the Southeast Seiner Boat Owners and Operators, and the United Fisherman of Alaska. All these different organizational bodies intended for the TTRA to constitute and herald a step towards rational management of the Tongass National Forest. The Salmon Bay Protective Association founded by commercial fisherman Alan Stein won a landmark lawsuit in federal district court which enjoined logging within 100 feet of salmon streams.Stein v. Barton, 740 F. Supp. 743 (D. Alaska 1990. Publicity generated by the lawsuit galvanized support in Congress for the buffer strip provision within the TTRA. https://oac.cdlib.org/findaid/ark:/13030/c8n01d2n/

== The TTRA in Congress ==
The intention of the legislation was aimed at safeguarding clean water and riparian habitats, protecting the old-growth of the Tongass National Forest, and reducing the economic strain on federal funding through the 4.5 billion board feet decadal guaranteed timber budget.

Initially a large goal of the bill was to terminate the two existing long-term contracts of the KPC and APC. In the final bill this goal was amended to apply specific modifications to the existing long-term timber contracts. The hope with this Act was to eliminate a bias in favor of timber production in the Tongass, and to require the forest service to meet the needs of the other resource based industries involved in the Tongass. Initially, the following areas were proposed to receive Wilderness status: Port Houghton, Castle River, and East Kuiu Island. This was part of the original bill that passed the House in 1989, but was dropped in the final bill. The bill became a compromise between further conservation and continuing to accommodate economic growth in the region by permitting the continuation of the long-term timber contracts.

== Details of Amendments ==
=== Section 101: To require annual appropriations for timber management of the Tongass National Forest ===
In ANILCA section 705 (a) is replaced with:

Subject to appropriations, other applicable law, and the requirements of the National Forest Management Act of 1976... except as provided in subsection (d) of this section, the Secretary shall, to the extent consistent with providing for the multiple use and sustained yield of all renewable forest resources, seek to provide a supply of timber from the Tongass National Forest which (1) meets the annual market demand for timber from such forest and (2) meets the market demand from such forest for each planning cycle.

This essentially subjects the Tongass National forest to the same laws and market demands as all other National Forests of the US - in the context of timber harvest, repealing the prior mandated harvest of 4.5 billion board feet per ten years and the guaranteed funding.

=== Section 102: Identification of Lands unsuitable for Timber Production ===
This amends section 705 (d) of ANILCA, limiting the Forest Service from excessively harvesting old-growth timber.

=== Section 103: Fisheries Protection ===
This amends section 705 (d) of ANILCA, which allowed leniency in designating which areas were to be open to timber harvest. In Stein v Barton, 740 F. Supp. 743 (D. Alaska 1990) fishermen got an injunction against logging within 100 feet of either side of salmon streams. Congress enacted the court ordered protection after Stein and the Salmon Bay Protection Association and their allies--- four fish canneries, 1,000 Alaska fishermen, Native groups, and many fishing organizations-- lobbied hard for the mandatory 100 foot buffer strip provision. https://oac.cdlib.org/findaid/ark:/13030/c8n01d2n/

   The US Forest Service argued it should have discretion but 40 years of abuse under its administration persuaded fishermen only a prescriptive law would be adequate. This section focuses on protecting riparian ecosystems by creating a minimum 100-foot buffer on the banks of anadromous stream systems and tributaries (Class I and II streams), a buffer modeled per recommendation from the National Marine Fisheries Service. This amendment protects stream-side banks. Harvesting in these areas increases soil erosion, threatening the quality of the watershed ecosystems and the potentially harming the fish that reside in these streams.[5]

=== Section 104: Future reports of the Tongass National Forest and Consultation ===
This is in amendment of section 706 (b) of ANILCA. Requires the Forest Service to report to congress on the impacts of timber harvest on subsistence, wildlife and fisheries habitats, while also consulting on the status reports with the Southeast Alaska commercial fishing organizations. In response to credibility issue between the Forest Service and the public, the courts and the Congress, due to conviction from the Forest Service that no matter how much timber is harvested, no adverse impacts will occur.

=== Section 105: Small business Set Aside Program. ===
This section intended to increase small business participation in the Tongass, in order to tackle the monopoly of the KPC and the APC in the timber industry.

=== Section 106: Tenakee Springs Road ===
This section prohibited the construction of further road systems that would connect the logging road of Chichagof Island to Tenakee Springs by the Forest Service, aiming to preserve the quality of Tongass.

=== Title III – Modification of Long-term Timber Sale Contracts in Alaska ===
Rather than cancel the 50 year contracts with KPC and APC, the act has amendments that applied to the current contracts, consisting of nine specific reform directives.

== Implementation of the TTRA ==
Seen by some as the "most significant piece of conservation law, the TTRA created 6 new areas of wilderness totalling 296,080 acres. This means that lands are closed to logging, road construction, mine development, and to is required to be managed as part of the National Wilderness Preservation System under the Wilderness Act of 1964. During the congressional negotiations concerning the TTRA, the House wanted to eliminate the designated decadal harvest levels, terminate the long-term contracts existing with the KPC and the APC, designate more of the Tongass to wilderness status, and provide increased protection to fisheries. The Senate were hesitant to endorse the extensive reforms, concerned for the local economy of Southeast Alaska, and the Alaskans that relied on the timber industry of the Tongass for employment. The Senate were in support of the goal to improve the management of the Tongass by the Forest Service.

The application of the TTRA modifications by the Forest Service did see positive changes in the management of the Tongass. However, reforms are seen to fall short of encompassing the intention and goals of Congress in passing the TTRA.

An article published in a local newspaper of Juneau, mentioned that the "Law provision cancelled a $40 million annual subsidy for timber harvest" and "significantly reshaped the logging industry's relationship with the Tongass National Forest." It was observed however that the Forest Services were resistant in adhering to the reforms set out in the TTRA on the Tongass. After the TTRA's enactment, it appeared that timber production was still the main resource on which the Forest Service focused its management, prioritizing the sale of the Tongass forest to the mills with which it held its contracts. The state of Alaska noted that the Forest service inadequately assessed the impacts on water quality due to logging, as well as avoiding assessing the adverse effects on a variety of other industries and activities that rely on the health of the Tongass National Forest. Delineating buffers around streams of Class I and II that were explicitly stipulated in section 103 of the TTRA have been carried out by the Forest Service. However, the requirements laid forth in section 103 have been inadequately enforced and interpreted in a way that reduces the intended protection. The Forest Service applied the 100-foot buffer by slope distance rather than exclusively horizontal distance. This can lead to a significant reduction in the final buffer zone afforded to the stream, particularly as the Tongass National Forest consists predominantly of steep terrain. An additional 733,482 acres were designated to Land Use Designation II, meaning that the management of these lands were to be carried out without further road construction. In 1993 the Alaska Pulp Corporation located in Sitka, closed its doors due to unprofitable business circumstances, followed shortly by the Ketchikan Pulp Company in 1997 for similar reasons.
