= Ketchikan Pulp Company =

Defunct pulp mill in Alaska, United States

Ketchikan Pulp Company was a pulp mill located on the north shore of Ward Cove, 5 miles (8.0 km) from Ketchikan, in the U.S. state of Alaska. Owned by Louisiana-Pacific, it operated between 1954 and 1997. It was the last pulp mill to operate in the state.

Along with the Sitka pulp mill, the mill was built as part of a U.S. Forest Service economic development program for Southeast Alaska. Ketchikan Pulp Company was originally built as a joint venture between Puget Sound Pulp & Lumber Co. and American Viscose Corporation Over time Georgia Pacific acquired Puget Sound Pulp & Lumber and FMC Corporation acquired American Viscose. Eventually, the company was spun off along with other holdings to form the Louisiana-Pacific Corp., the plant's new owner. KPC was a sulfite process dissolving pulp mill, designed to manufacture a product called "Tongacell," made from cellulose fiber from Spruce and Tsuga trees, which is used in the manufacture of various rayon products. Feedstock for the mill was harvested from the Tongass National Forest under guaranteed 50-year supply contracts that enabled the private companies to commit the large development investments in an area with only one log supplier (the USFS). This became controversial in the late 1980s, due to environmental concerns with the scale of old-growth forest harvesting and criticism of the multimillion-dollar subsidies. In 1990, the Tongass Timber Reform Act directed the agency to terminate the long-term timber contracts, and both mills closed shortly thereafter. The last bale of pulp paper to come off the mill is on display at the Southeast Alaska Discovery Center in Ketchikan.
