= San Bartolomé mine =

Silver Mine Potosi, Southern Bolivia

- Location: Potosí Department, Bolivia
- Products: silver
- Company: Empresa Minera Manquiri

The San Bartolomé mine in Bolivia is one of the largest silver mines in the world. The mine is located in the south of the country in Potosí Department.

Built by Coeur Mining, San Bartolomé achieved commercial production in June 2008.

In February 2018, Coeur Mining sold San Bartolomé to AG-Mining Investments AB, a company incorporated on November 30, 2017 under the laws of Sweden. San Bartolomé is now owned by Andean Precious Metals Corp. (TSX-V:APM)(OTCQX:ANPMF).

Effective September 30, 2020, Ag-Mining entered into an arrangement and exchange agreement with 1254688 B.C. Ltd., which was incorporated on June 25, 2020 under the laws of British Columbia, Canada. Pursuant to the agreement, the shareholders of AG Mining became shareholders of 1254688 BC by exchanging 100% of their outstanding common shares of AG Mining for common shares of 1254688 BC, proportionally based on each shareholder’s respective interest of AG Mining. Upon the completion of the agreement, AG Mining became a wholly owned subsidiary of 1254688 BC. The transaction was accounted for as a capital transaction using the continuity of interest method. On March 18, 2021, 1254688 BC completed its amalgamation with 1271860 B.C. Ltd., a wholly owned subsidiary of Buckhaven Capital Corp.; the amalgamated company became 1295229 B.C. Ltd. 1254688 BC acquired Buckhaven by way of reverse takeover in accordance with the policies of the TSX-V, resulting in 1295229 BC as the amalgamated entity to continue to carry on business. Buckhaven was renamed Andean Precious Metals Corp. and commenced trading on the TSX-V on March 29, 2021.

Andean Precious Metals continues to operate the San Bartolomé plant, the largest commercial oxide plant in Bolivia.
