= Alaska Department of Environmental Conservation =

Alaska state agency

The Alaska Department of Environmental Conservation (ADEC) is the environmental regulatory agency within the government of Alaska. The Alaska Legislature established ADEC in 1971, and the agency's responsibilities were transferred from the Alaska Department of Health. As of 2022 the ADEC Commissioner is Jason W. Brune.

The department administers laws and regulations pertaining to the areas of water quality, water rights and water resources, shoreline management, toxics clean-up, nuclear waste, hazardous waste, and air quality. It also conducts monitoring and scientific assessments.
