= Coeur Mining =

American precious metals mining company

Coeur Mining, Inc.
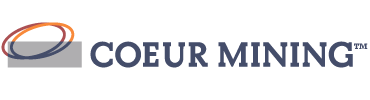
- Type: Public
- Traded as: NYSE: CDE; S&P 400 component
- Industry: Mining
- Founded: 1928; 98 years ago
- Headquarters: Chicago, Illinois, United States
- Key people: Mitchell J. Krebs (President and CEO); Robert E. Mellor (Chairman of the Board)
- Products: Silver; Gold
- Revenue: US$665.777 million (2016)
- Operating income: US$69.104 million (2016)
- Net income: US$55.352 million (2016)
- Number of employees: 1,898 (December 31, 2012)
- Divisions: Coeur Mexicana S.A. de C.V. ("Coeur Mexicana"); Coeur Alaska, Inc. Coeur Rochester, Inc. Coeur Wharf; Coeur Silvertip
- Website: coeur.com

Coeur Mining, Inc. is a precious metals mining company listed on the New York Stock Exchange. It operates five mines located in North America. Coeur employs 2,200 people and in 2012 it was the world's 9th largest silver producer. In 2013 the company changed its name to Coeur Mining, Inc. from Coeur d'Alene Mines and moved its head office to Chicago, Illinois from Coeur d'Alene, Idaho.

== History ==
Coeur Mining was formed in 1928 to mine silver in the Coeur d'Alene region of Idaho. The company was an important mine operator in northern Idaho for many decades and among others operated the Coeur d'Alene Silver Mine, the Coeur Mine and the Galena Mine. The firm sold its remaining assets in the region in July, 2006.

In the past 30 years, Coeur has acquired and operated mines in the US, Mexico, Bolivia, Chile, Argentina and New Zealand and has had operating interests in mines in Australia. It also held investments in various exploration and mining companies. For a short while, it manufactured hose, duct and metal tubing.

In 2013, Coeur stablished Coeur Capital, Inc. to hold royalties and strategic investments.

In 2016, the company produced 14.8 million ounces of silver (Ag) and 358,170 ounces of gold (Au).

In 2022, Coeur applied for a 48.7-acre expansion of their Wharf mine in South Dakota. The expansion was approved by the state board in July 2023.

== Acquisitions and sales ==
In 1983 Coeur acquired Asarco's operating lease on the Rochester Mine in Nevada. Production began in 1986 and the mine continues to operate in 2016. A year later, Coeur became the sole owner of the Wharf Gold Mine in South Dakota, following the merger of Wharf Ltd. and Wharf USA, Inc.

In 1987, the company acquired a 50% interest in the Kensington Property in Alaska. The remaining 50% was purchased in 1995 and production commenced in 2010. The mine continues to operate in 2014.

In 1990, Coeur acquired the Fachinal property in Chile from a Chilean exploration company. The underground gold-silver Fachinal mine also known as the Cerro Bayo Mine was put into production in 1985 and closed in 2008. The Cerro Bayo assets were sold in 2010 to Mandalay Resources Corporation.

A year later, Coeur acquired all of the outstanding common stock of Callahan Mining Corporation. This acquisition included the Galena Mine and the Flexaust Company, which manufactured flexible hose, duct and metal tubing. Coeur sold Flexaust in 1995.

In 1993, Coeur acquired an 80% operating interest in the Golden Cross Mine from Cyprus Gold New Zealand Limited. The mine is an underground and surface gold mine located near Waihi, New Zealand. The mine was closed in 1998. A year later, the firm purchased controlling and operating interest in the underground gold-silver El Bronce Mine near Santiago Chile from Compania Minera El Bronce de Petorca. The mine operated until 2001 when it was shut down and Coeur sold its interest in the project in 2002.

In 1995, Coeur and ASARCO placed their interests in northern Idaho mines (Coeur, Galena and Calday mines) into a new corporation, Silver Valley Resources Corporation. The Coeur Mine was subsequently closed in 1998 and the Galena Mine continued to operate until 2006 when Coeur sold its interests in Silver Valley Resources to U.S. Silver Corporation.

In 1999, Coeur acquired the San Bartolomé silver project in Bolivia from ASARCO. The San Bartolome Mine was put into production in 2008 and continues to operate in 2014.

In 2002, Coeur acquired the Martha underground silver mine in Argentina from Yamana Resources Inc. Coeur operated the mine until September 2012 when it was shut down.

In 2005, the firm acquired all of the silver production and reserves, up to 20 million payable ounces, contained at the Endeavor Mine in Australia as well as all of the silver production and reserves, up to 17.2 million payable ounces, at the Broken Hill Mine in Australia.

In 2007, the firm acquired the Palmarejo project from Bolnisi Gold NL and Palmarejo Silver and Gold Corporation. The Palmarejo Mine was put into production in 2008 and continues to operate in 2014.

In 2017, Coeur acquired all claims and infrastructure to the Silvertip mine in northern British Columbia.

A year later, in 2018, Coeur sold Empresa Minera Manquiri, including San Bartolomé mine, to Andean Precious Metals Corp.

== Operations ==
Kensington Mine is an underground gold mine located in the Alaskan panhandle about 75 km northwest of Juneau, Alaska. The Kensington property consists of 14,000 acres of mineral claims held by Coeur Alaska, a subsidiary of Coeur Mining. Mining in the Kensington region first took place in the late 1800s and early 1900s and has occurred intermittently since that time. Coeur acquired 50% of the Kensington property in 1987 and then 100% in 1995. After considerable exploration work involving option agreements with a number of different companies and a court case that contested permits issued by the US Army Corps of Engineers, the Kensington mine was finally put into Production on July 3, 2010. The Kensington mine is an underground vein-style gold mine with several individual vein systems including the Kensington, Eureka, Raven, Elmira and Julian-Empire veins. The mine uses the cut-and-fill or stope-and-fill underground mining method. In 2012, the mine produced 82,125 ounces of gold at a grade of 0.22 oz./ton and a total production cost of $18.65/oz. Reserves at the end of 2012 were just over 1 million ounces of gold.

Rochester Mine is a heap-leach surface silver and gold mine located in the Humboldt Mountains near Lovelock, Nevada. The property consists of 9724 acres of mineral claims, in the district of the historic mining town of Rochester, Nevada. Historic mining in the Rochester Mine area occurred from 1909 to 1935 and consisted of underground mining of high grade silver and gold veins. Coeur acquired the property in 1983 and restarted mining operations as a surface mine in 1986. Except for a three-year shut down from 2007 to 2010 due to low reserves and metal prices, the mine has operated continuously since re-opening. The Rochester Mine produces ore from a conventional open pit operation, and from surface stockpiles of ore. The ore is processed using cyanide heap-leaching to produce silver-gold bars. In 2012 the mine produced 2.8 million ounces of silver and 38,066 ounces of gold at a grade of 0.55 oz./ton silver and 0.0047 oz./ton gold and at a total production cost of $14.05 per ounce of silver. Reserves at the end of 2012 were 44.9 million ounces of silver and 308,000 ounces of gold.

Palmarejo Mine is a surface and underground gold and silver mine located about 420 kilometers by road southwest of the city of Chihuahua in northwestern Mexico. The property consists of over 12,000 hectares of mineral claims encompassing several silver and gold veins systems. Small-scale underground mining for silver veins in the Palmarejo area has occurred intermittently since the early 1800s. Coeur acquired the property in 2007 and mining commenced in 2008. The Pamerejo mine produces ore from surface and underground operations that target a number of silver-gold vein systems. The ore is processed using flotation and cyanide leaching to produce silver-gold bars. In 2012, the mine produced 8.2 million ounces of silver and 106,038 ounces of gold at a grade of 4.7 oz./ton silver and 0.05 oz./ton gold and at a total production cost of $19.26/oz. of silver. Reserves at the end of 2012 were 5.3 million ounces of silver and 665,000 ounces of gold.

San Bartolomé mine is a surface silver mine located near the historic mining city of Potosi, Bolivia; a world heritage site. Mining of silver and silver-tin veins from Cerro Rico, a volcanic mountain adjacent to Potosi, began in the mid 1500s and has been continuous for over 450 years. In the 1650s, Potosi was the largest city in the western hemisphere with 160,000 residents. Today, up to 15,000 people make a living mining small underground silver-tin veins. The property consists of approximately 4,800 hectares of surface mineral claims that encompass gravel deposits or silver-bearing rock along the flank of Cerro Rico. Coeur acquired the San Bartolome property in 1999 and began current mining operations in 2008. The San Bartolomé Mine involves free digging of mineralized gravels along the flanks of Cerro Rico. This material is processed in a conventional cyanide leaching operation using the Merrill–Crowe process. In 2012, the mine produced 5.9 million ounces of silver at a grade of 4.49 oz./ton and at a total operating cost of $15.81/oz. At the end of 2012 reserves are at 109 million ounces of silver.

Wharf Mine is an open pit, heap leach gold operation located in the northern Black Hills of western South Dakota. The property consists of several areas of gold mineralization, which have been mined as a series of open pits. The Wharf mine is located approximately four miles southwest of Lead, South Dakota, and is the only known mining operation to share a hillside with a ski hill, Terry Peak ski resort. Gold was discovered in the Black Hills in 1874 and the first claims were staked over the current-day Wharf mine in 1877. Through the decades, exploration continued as did ownership of the area mines. In 1984, through the merger of Wharf Ltd. and Wharf USA, Inc., Coeur Mining became the sole owner of Coeur Wharf. Today, Coeur Wharf remains the only operating gold mine in South Dakota. Coeur Wharf employs approximately 260 mining professionals of which approximately 98% live in the Black Hills. The Wharf mine has been in operation since 1982 and represents 24% of Coeur's gold production (2022). In January 2022, the Lawrence County Commission approved Coeur Wharf's Conditional Use Permit application, also known as the Boston Expansion. This approval, which is one of the two needed, the other being the State Mine Permit approval, allows for an expansion of Coeur's mining operations by 48.7 acres and potentially extends the mine life for one to three years. Coeur continues to work with State-level regulatory authorities to secure the other requisite authorizations which is anticipated in the second half of 2023.

== Projects ==
As of January, 2014 Coeur Mining holds two main exploration projects: Joaquin in Argentina and La Preciosa in Mexico.

Joaquin is an advanced stage silver-gold exploration project located in Santa Cruz province of southern Argentina. Gold and silver mineralization was discovered on the property by Mirosal Resources in 2004. Coeur began exploring the property in 2007 under an option agreement and acquired 100% of the property from Mirosal Resources in 2012. The property contains oxide and sulphide silver-gold mineralization in epithermal veins, breccias and stockworks hosted in acid volcanic rocks of the Deseado Massif; a well-known mineralized belt in southern Argentina. In January, 2013 Joaquin has a measured and indicated mineral resource estimate of 15.7 million tonnes at 128.9 g/t Ag and 0.12 g/t Au and an inferred mineral resource estimate of 1 million tonnes at 100.7 g/t Ag and 0.12 g/t Au.

La Preciosa is an advanced stage silver-gold project located in Durango State Mexico. Coeur acquired the La Preciosa property through the acquisition of Orko Silver Corporation on April 16, 2013. The property contains epithermal silver and gold veins and breccia bodies. As of July 26, 2013 La Preciosa had a measured and indicated mineral resource estimate of 51.9 million tonnes at 87.54 g/t Ag and 0.166 g/t Au and an indicated mineral resource estimate of 17.7 million tonnes at 66.31 g/t Ag and 0.106 g/t Au at a NSR cut off of $20.43/tonne.

Silvertip is a silver-zinc-lead project located in northern British Columbia, Canada, just south of the Yukon border. Silvertip is one of the highest-grade silver-zinc-lead operations in the world and sites within a highly prospective land package. Coeur suspended mining and processing activities at Silvertip in early 2020 and has since commenced evaluation of a larger potential expansion and restart of the project. The Silvertip project is situated on a relatively small footprint in the Rancheria watershed and is accessible via an existing British Columbia and Yukon forestry road. Exploration and mining activity in the area dates back to the 1960s. Coeur purchased the Silvertip claims and infrastructure in 2017 and currently employs approximately 60 mining professionals.

== Coeur Capital, Inc. ==
Coeur Capital, Inc. was formed in 2013 to hold Coeur's existing and future royalty and streaming interests along with its portfolio of strategic equity investments. In December 2013 it acquired Global Royalty Corp, a private company with royalty interests in mines in Mexico and Ecuador. As part of the acquisition, Mark Kucher, President and CEO of Global Royalty, joined Coeur Capital as the Managing Director.

Coeur Capital holds a non-operating interest in the Endeavor Mine in New South Wales Australia. It acquired this interest in 2005 for $44.0 million and it entitles the firm to all of the silver production and reserves (up to 20.0 million payable ounces) contained at the Endeavor Mine. The company also owns net smelter royalties on the Cerro Bayo Mine in Chile, the El Gallo complex in Mexico, and the Zaruma Mine in Ecuador. Coeur Capital also maintains shareholdings in a number of junior exploration companies for investment purposes. These include Hudra Silver, Pershing Gold, Commonwealth Silver, International Northair Mines, Silver Bull Resources, Soltoro, Caracara Silver, and Apogee Silver.

== See also ==
- Coeur Alaska, Inc. v. Southeast Alaska Conservation Council
