= Raquel Gil Montero =

Argentine historian

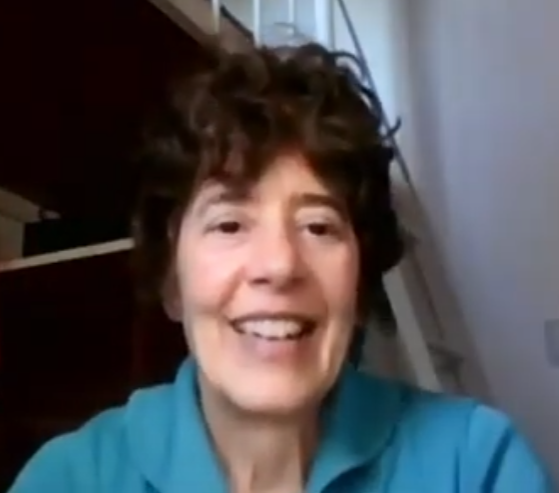
- In a UBA video in 2021
- Education: National University of Córdoba; National University of Cuyo
- Occupation: Historian

Raquel Gil Montero is an Argentine historian. She published several books, including Caravaneros y trashumantes en los Andes Meridionales (2004) and Ciudades efímeras (2014). She was a Guggenheim Fellow in 2011 and was president of the Asociación Argentina de Investigadores en Historia from 2019 to 2021.

== Biography ==
Gil studied at the National University of Córdoba, where she obtained her licentiate and PhD in history, and the National University of Cuyo, where she obtained a specialist certificate in university teaching. She also worked as a senior researcher for the National Scientific and Technical Research Council, specializing in history and joining the National University of Tucumán Instituto Superior de Estudios Sociales as a full-time researcher in 2002.

Gil specializes in topics such as labour history, population history, and the Spanish colonial era in the Andes. In 2004, she published Caravaneros y trashumantes en los Andes Meridionales, a history book on indigenous people in the 18th and 19th-century Jujuy puna; Jean Piel called it "doubly a good deed: for the Andean world and for Peru". In the late 2000s, she did a research project on pastoralism with the collaboration of European and Asian researchers, published in the journal Nomadic Peoples. She later published another book, Ciudades efímeras (2014), focusing on the pre-19th-century history of the Lípez area in Bolivia and its mining industry. Other books she authored include Los pueblos de indios del Tucumán colonial (2002, with Judith Farberman), La construcción de Argentina y Bolivia en los Andes Meridionales (2008), and Visitas coloniales en diálogo (2023, with María Laura Salinas). She has also served as editor for the journal Población & Sociedad.

In 2011, Gil was awarded a Guggenheim Fellowship in History, to be done on a history book focusing on Andean miners and herders. After serving as vice-president from 2017 to 2019, she was president of the Asociación Argentina de Investigadores en Historia from 2019 to 2021. In 2024, she was appointed corresponding academician of the National Academy of History of Argentina for Tucuman. She was a Käte Hamburger Center Fellow at the University of Münster in 2024 and 2025.

== Bibliography ==
- (with Judith Farberman) Los pueblos de indios del Tucumán colonial (2002)
- Caravaneros y trashumantes en los Andes Meridionales (2004)
- La construcción de Argentina y Bolivia en los Andes Meridionales (2008)
- Ciudades efímeras (2014)
- (with María Laura Salinas) Visitas coloniales en diálogo (2023)
