= Alaska mid-air collision =

Alaska mid-air collision may refer to:

- 2019 Alaska mid-air collision, involving a Mountain Air Service de Havilland Canada DHC-2 Beaver floatplane and a Taquan Air de Havilland Canada DHC-3 Turbine Otter floatplane over George Inlet; six fatalities
- 2020 Alaska mid-air collision, involving a private de Havilland DHC-2 Beaver and a private Piper PA-12 near Soldotna Airport; seven fatalities including Alaska State Representative Gary Knopp
- 2023 Alaska mid-air collision, involving a pair of U.S. Army AH-64 Apache helicopters near Healy; three fatalities
