= WWP =

WWP may refer to:

== Arts and entertainment ==
- WWP, mixtape by Tyla
- Wizards of Waverly Place, a teen sitcom (2007–2012)
- Women Writers Project, an online corpus
- World Waterpark, Edmonton, Canada
- World Wrestling Professionals, South Africa
- World Wide Pictures, an American evangelical film company
- Worms World Party, a 2001 video game

== Other uses ==
- Workers World Party, a political party
- West Windsor-Plainsboro Regional School District, New Jersey, US
- Wounded Warrior Project, an American veteran's organization
- North Whale Seaplane Base, Alaska, US (IATA:WWP)
