= 2019 Alaska mid-air collision =

2019 mid-air collision over Alaska

2019 Alaska mid-air collision Mountain Air Service DHC-2 · Taquan Air DHC-3
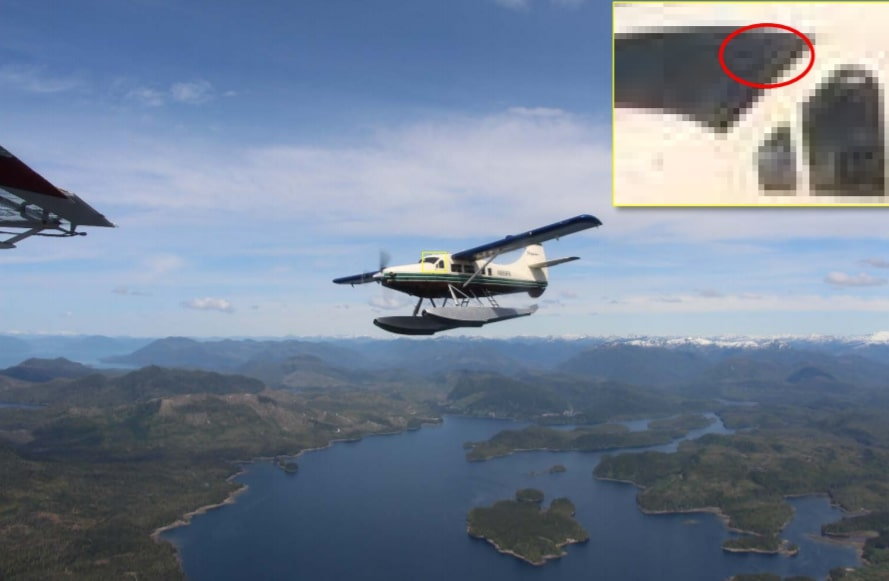
- The DHC-3 photographed by a passenger on the DHC-2 just before the collision; the red oval illustrates the window post blocking the pilot's view

Accident
- Date: May 13, 2019
- Summary: Mid-air collision, failure to see and avoid conflicting air traffic
- Site: George Inlet, Alaska, United States; 55°25′32″N 131°30′18″W
- Total fatalities: 6
- Total injuries: 10
- Total survivors: 10

First aircraft
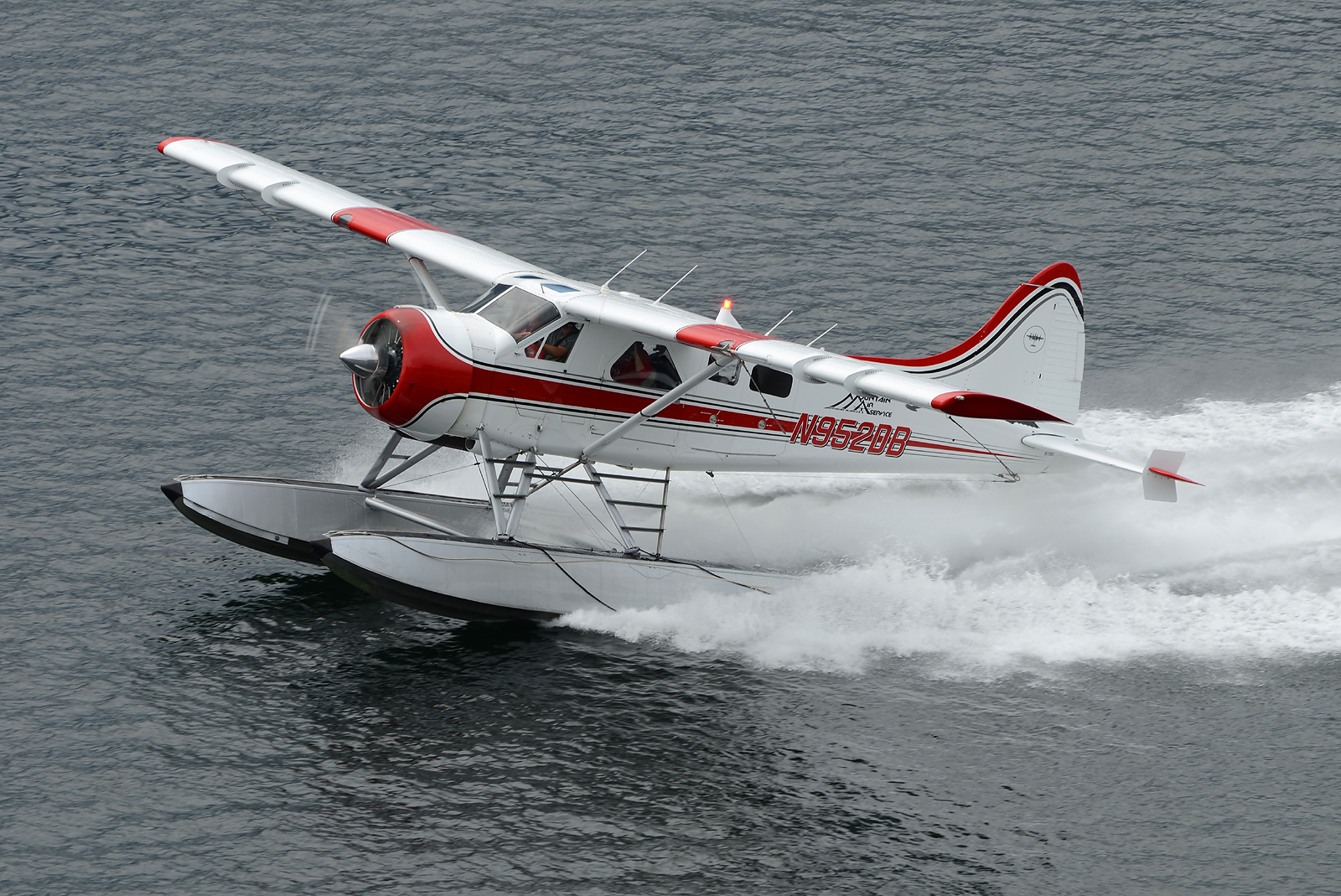
- N952DB, the de Havilland Canada DHC-2 Beaver involved in the collision, seen in 2015
- Type: de Havilland Canada DHC-2 Beaver
- Operator: Mountain Air Service
- Registration: N952DB
- Flight origin: Rudyerd Bay
- Destination: Ketchikan Harbor Seaplane Base
- Occupants: 5
- Passengers: 4
- Crew: 1
- Fatalities: 5
- Survivors: 0

Second aircraft
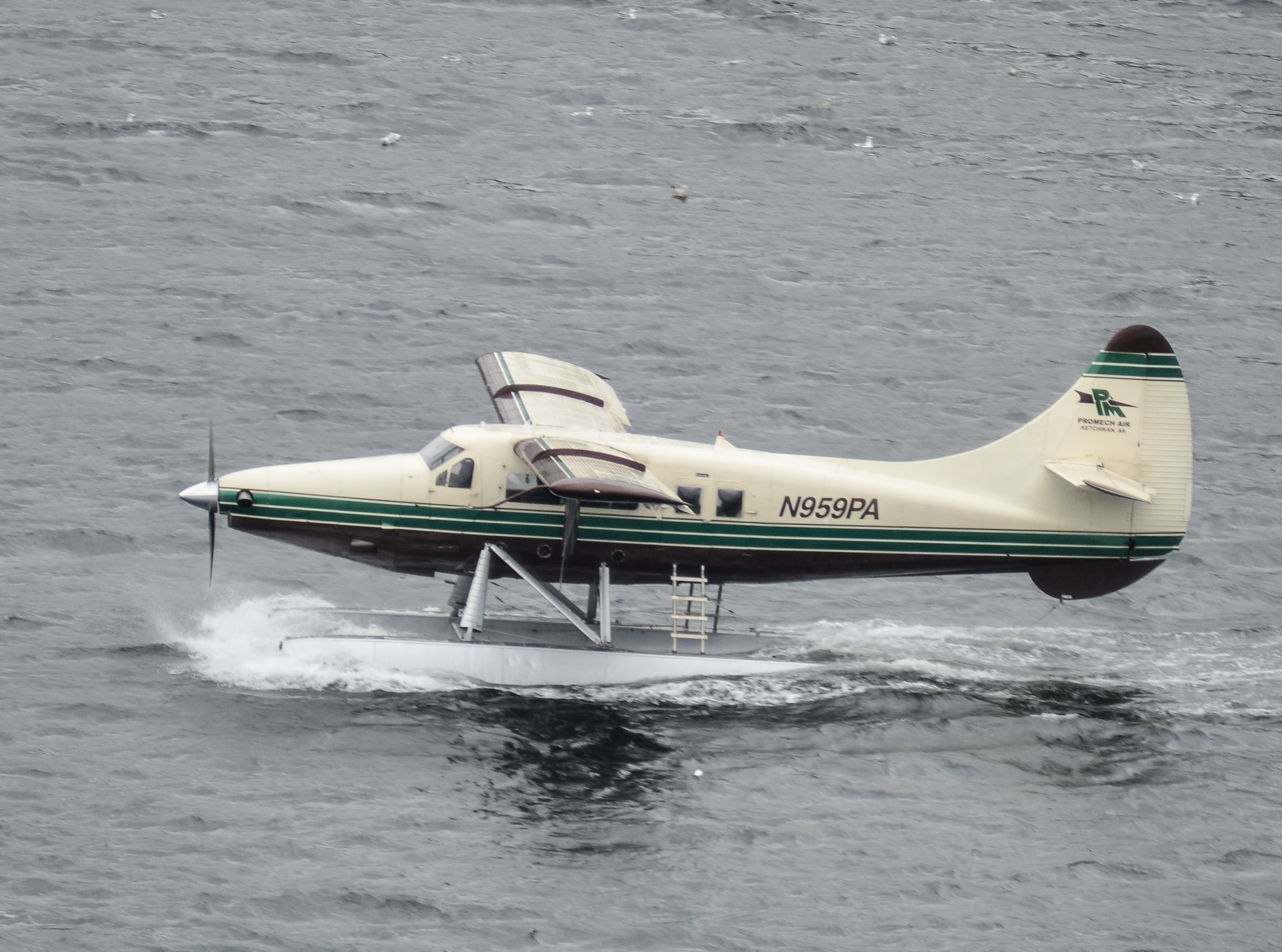
- N959PA, the de Havilland Canada DHC-3 Turbine Otter involved in the collision, seen in 2014
- Type: de Havilland Canada DHC-3 Turbine Otter
- Operator: Taquan Air
- Call sign: Taquan
- Registration: N959PA
- Flight origin: Ketchikan Harbor Seaplane Base
- Destination: Ketchikan Harbor Seaplane Base
- Occupants: 11
- Passengers: 10
- Crew: 1
- Fatalities: 1
- Injuries: 10
- Survivors: 10

On May 13, 2019, a de Havilland Canada DHC-2 Beaver floatplane operated by Mountain Air Service collided with a Taquan Air de Havilland Canada DHC-3 Turbine Otter floatplane over George Inlet, Alaska, United States. The DHC-2 broke up in mid-air with the loss of all four passengers and the pilot. The DHC-3 pilot was able to maintain partial control – enough to perform a forced landing on George Inlet – but the aircraft sustained substantial damage in the collision and the landing; the pilot suffered minor injuries, nine passengers suffered serious injuries, and one passenger was killed. Both aircraft were conducting sightseeing flights under visual flight rules, which state that the pilot of each aircraft is responsible for visually ensuring adequate separation from other air traffic, commonly known as "see and avoid".

In April 2021, the National Transportation Safety Board (NTSB) attributed the accident to "'the inherent limitations of the see-and-avoid concept, along with the absence of alerts from both airplanes' traffic display systems." Due to the angle of approach, the DHC-2 pilot's view was obscured by the aircraft structure and the passenger sitting in the right-hand seat, while the DHC-2 was blocked from the DHC-3 pilot's view by the left front window post. Both aircraft were equipped with Automatic Dependent Surveillance–Broadcast (ADS–B) traffic alert systems, but the DHC-3 automatic alert feature had been disabled by an equipment change, while the alert features of the DHC-2 system did not trigger because avionics in the DHC-3 were not broadcasting the aircraft's altitude. The NTSB also identified Taquan's inadequate preflight checklist and the Federal Aviation Administration's failure to require Taquan to implement a safety management system as contributing factors.

== Aircraft and crew ==
The first accident aircraft was a de Havilland Canada DHC-2 Beaver floatplane, Federal Aviation Administration (FAA) aircraft registration number N952DB, serial number 237, owned and operated by Mountain Air Service LLC since 2012. It was manufactured in 1951, was equipped with Edo floats, and had 16,452 total flight hours at the time of its most recent annual inspection in on April 16, 2019.

The second accident aircraft was a de Havilland Canada DHC-3 Turbine Otter floatplane, FAA number N959PA, serial number 159, manufactured in 1956, owned by Pantechnicon Aviation Ltd. since 2012, and operated by Taquan Air since 2016. It was also equipped with Edo floats, and had logged 30,297 hours of operation at its last annual inspection on April 30, 2019.

Both aircraft were conducting local sightseeing flights of the Misty Fjords National Monument area for the benefit of passengers of a Princess Cruises cruise ship docked in Ketchikan, Alaska, and were operating under the provisions of 14 CFR Part 135 as on-demand sightseeing flights under visual flight rules (VFR). Neither aircraft carried, nor was required to carry, a cockpit voice recorder or flight data recorder.

The DHC-2 pilot was identified as 46-year-old Randy Sullivan. He held a commercial pilot certificate and a flight instructor certificate, ratings for seaplanes with single or multiple engines, and a valid second-class medical certificate with no limitations. His personal flight records could not be located but he had reported around 11,000 flight hours during his last medical exam. He was the owner and sole pilot for Mountain Air Service.

The DHC-3 pilot was identified as 60-year-old Lou Beck. He held an airline transport pilot certificate and a flight instructor certificate, a rating for single-engine seaplanes, and a valid first-class medical certificate with a limitation requiring corrective lenses. He had been hired by Taquan Air in 2018 and flew for the airline primarily during the summer months. According to Taquan records, he had about 25,000 flight hours, with about 15,000 hours as pilot-in-command.

== Accident ==
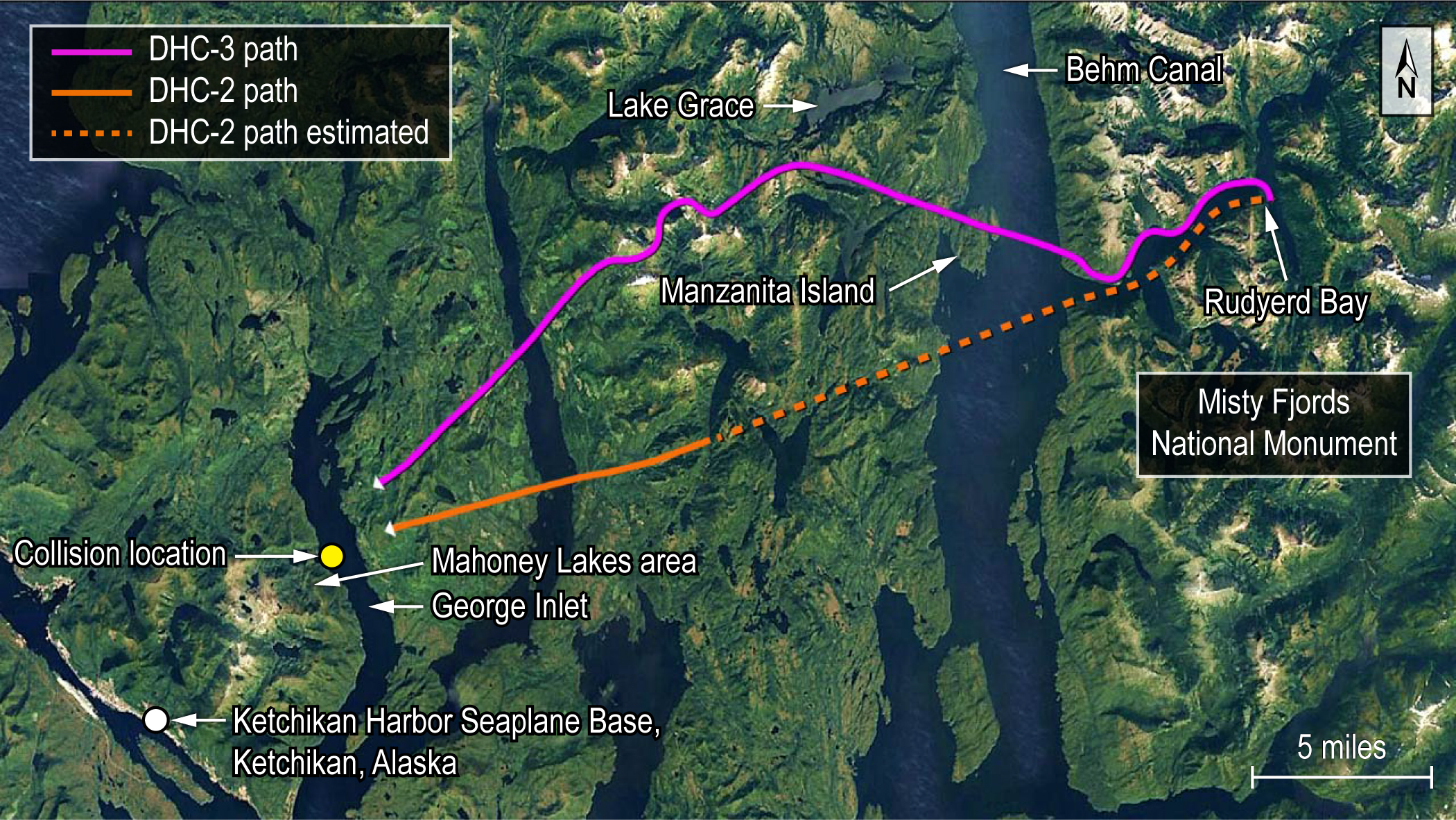
NTSB illustration of the flight paths of N952DB (orange line) and N959PA (pink line) prior to the collision

Both aircraft were returning to Ketchikan Harbor Seaplane Base approximately 7 miles (11 km) southwest. The DHC-2 was flying at 107 knots (123 mph; 198 km/h) at an altitude of about 3,350 feet (1,020 m) mean sea level (MSL) while the DHC-3 was gradually descending at 126 knots (145 mph; 233 km/h) from an altitude of 3,700 feet (1,100 m) MSL. Visual meteorological conditions prevailed. The DHC-3 was equipped with an Automatic Dependent Surveillance–Broadcast (ADS–B) collision warning system, but the pilot did not perceive any ADS–B collision warnings before he saw a "flash" to his left, and the two aircraft collided at 12:21 pm local time at an altitude of about 3,350 feet (1,020 m) MSL. One of the passengers in the DHC-3 reportedly saw the other aircraft before the collision and yelled "Pull up! Pull up!" before impact. The collision broke the windshield and separated the left rear door from the DHC-3.

The DHC-2 broke up in mid-air, creating an approximately 2,000-by-1,000-foot (600 by 300 m) debris field about 1.75 miles (2.82 km) southwest of the DHC-3 crash site. The DHC-2 fuselage, empennage, and cabin structure were separated from one another, and the right wing showed damage consistent with propeller impacts. The pilot and all 4 passengers were killed.

The DHC-3 pitched about 27 degrees nose down, but the pilot was able to maintain partial control and perform a landing flare before touching down in George Inlet. On landing, the aircraft shuddered violently, the floats separated from the aircraft, and the cabin immediately flooded through the left rear door opening and broken windshield and began to sink. The pilot suffered head injuries in the collision and landing but was able to open the right rear door and help passengers exit. The pilot and surviving passengers were rescued by a nearby boater in a small skiff, who immediately called the United States Coast Guard and ferried the survivors to shore before a Coast Guard boat and helicopter arrived. The female passenger in the right front seat was severely injured and was seen motionless and slumped over in her seat as the aircraft sank. She was the only fatality on the DHC-3.

The DHC-3 came to rest under about 80 feet (20 m) of water. The fuselage forward of the bulkhead separating the passenger cabin from the cockpit was found mostly broken away from the rear fuselage, and the left side of the forward fuselage was more heavily damaged than the right side. Two propeller blades were partially broken off, while all three were bent and gouged in a manner consistent with heavy rotational contact with a solid object, and were smeared with white paint.

== Casualties ==
Nine passengers in the DHC-3 sustained serious injuries and one passenger died on the scene, while the pilot of the DHC-3 suffered head trauma during the accident; all four passengers and the pilot in the DHC-2 died on impact. Six injured victims were admitted to a local hospital and four others were evacuated to Seattle.

The bodies of three occupants of the DHC-2 were recovered from the water soon after the accident and the other two bodies were found in a wooded area near the shoreline the following day. The medical examiner determined the cause of death of all five DHC-2 occupants to have been blunt force trauma.

The body of the fatal front-seat passenger in the DHC-3 was found underwater, still strapped into her seat in the aircraft wreckage; her primary cause of death was determined to have been blunt force trauma with drowning being a contributing factor.

== Aftermath ==
Since the deceased DHC-2 pilot was the owner and sole pilot for Mountain Air Service, and the DHC-2 involved was the only aircraft owned by the airline, the company ceased all operations after the crash. Taquan Air Flight 20 crashed one week later on May 20 and the airline suspended all flights the following day. Amid increased oversight by the FAA, Taquan resumed limited cargo service on May 23, scheduled passenger flights on May 31, and on-demand sightseeing tours on June 3.

== Investigation ==
The National Transportation Safety Board (NTSB) immediately began an investigation of the accident. A preliminary NTSB accident report was published on May 22, 2019.

In a meeting held on April 20, 2021, the NTSB attributed the accident to "'the inherent limitations of the see-and-avoid concept along with the absence of alerts from both airplanes' traffic display systems." The NTSB examined Automatic Dependent Surveillance–Broadcast (ADS–B) aircraft position data, recorded data from the accident aircraft avionics, and photos taken by passengers in the accident aircraft. The NTSB found that the DHC-2 had been gradually climbing and had leveled off at an altitude of 3,350 ft (1,020 m) and a heading of about 255°, while the DHC-3 was descending from 4,000 ft (1,200 m) at a track ranging from 224° and 237°. The agency determined that the DHC-2 pilot would have been unable to see the DHC-3 approaching from his right due to the DHC-2 cockpit structure, the right-hand wing, and the passenger sitting in the right-hand front seat, while the left front window post in the DHC-3 obscured the DHC-2 from the pilot's view for 11 seconds leading up to the collision.

Both aircraft were equipped with ADS–B-based Cockpit Display of Traffic Information (CDTI). However, an FAA-provided equipment upgrade to the Garmin GSL 71 system in the DHC-3, implemented due to the phaseout of the FAA Capstone Program, had disabled the auditory traffic alert feature. Furthermore, the pressure altitude broadcasting feature of the GSL 71 was disabled because the control knob was set to the OFF position, and the Taquan Air preflight checklist (which listed the name of a different operator) did not require the pilot to set the knob to the appropriate position to broadcast pressure altitude. According to data records examined by the NTSB, the DHC-3 had not broadcast pressure altitude since April 29, 2019. The absence of pressure altitude broadcasts effectively disabled the automatic alert features in the ForeFlight mobile app CDTI used by the DHC-2 pilot, which was not designed to provide alerts when the target aircraft is not broadcasting pressure altitude. The lack of dedicated auditory or visual warnings left both pilots dependent on visually checking their CDTI display screens periodically.

The NTSB recommended that the FAA require Part 135 operators to implement safety management systems, which could have mitigated the lack of alerting capability of the CDTI in the Taquan DHC-3, and prompted the airline to update its preflight checklist to include appropriate CDTI settings. Additionally, the NTSB recommended that ForeFlight upgrade their software such that automatic alerts are provided by default when the target aircraft is not broadcasting pressure altitude.

== In popular culture ==
The 2019 Alaska mid-air collision was featured in the 2024 episode "Without Warning", of the Canadian-made, internationally distributed documentary series Mayday.

== See also ==
- 2009 Hudson River mid-air collision, another fatal collision involving VFR sightseeing flights
- 2020 Soldotna mid-air collision
- 2023 Denali Borough mid-air collision
- 2025 Potomac River mid-air collision, another fatal collision that happened due to similar limitations of the "see-and-avoid" concept
