= HYG =

HYG may refer to:

- IATA code for Hydaburg Seaplane Base
- Hooghly Ghat railway station
- Hygienic behavior in beekeeping, see Varroa sensitive hygiene
