= Taquan Air =

Commuter airline based out of Ketchikan, Alaska

IATA	ICAO	Call sign
K3	TQN	TAQUAN
- Founded: 1977
- AOC #: TQ0A509J
- Operating bases: Ketchikan Harbor Seaplane Base
- Hubs: Ketchikan
- Fleet size: 15
- Destinations: 16
- Parent company: Venture Travel, LLC
- Headquarters: Ketchikan, Alaska, United States
- Key people: Brien Salazar, CEO
- Website: www.TaquanAir.com

Taquan Air is the operating name for Venture Travel, LLC, an American regional airline headquartered in Ketchikan, a city in the southeastern portion of the U.S. state of Alaska. It operates domestic scheduled passenger and charter services. Its base is Ketchikan Harbor Seaplane Base, which shares the same harbor and airspace as Ketchikan International Airport. As per the United States Department of Transportation in a report dated August 2, 2010, Taquan Air is a "U.S. Certificated Air Carrier", and is 1 of 125 such carriers in the US.

Taquan Air's heyday was in 1997 when they were the largest floatplane company in the world and the second largest air commuter service in Alaska, carrying 243,000 passengers that year. In a continuing effort to grow, they sought FAR part 121 certification, allowing them to carry more than nine passengers on a flight. They achieved certification and began flights in 1998, but the costs of the new venture and economic factors led to the sale of assets and layoffs in 1999. New ownership in 2000 kept the company name alive, and Taquan remains known for their floatplanes.

Taquan Air's flight schedule provides for the delivery of US Mail, and includes service to the fourth-largest island in the US, Prince of Wales Island; and the easternmost town in Alaska, Hyder. An accident in 2007 associated with a raincloud has led to the installation of weather cameras throughout Alaska. Taquan Air, along with other Ketchikan flight services, provides "flightseeing" tours over pristine Misty Fjords National Monument, and bear viewings within the Earth's largest remaining temperate rainforest, Tongass National Forest.

== History ==
The name "Taquan" is from the Tlingit language for "village by the sea", and is also associated with the alternate name for Annette Island, Taak'w Aan.

=== Taquan Air Service Inc. ===
The airline was established as Taquan Air Service Incorporated in August 1977, and started out flying an air taxi service between Ketchikan International Airport and Metlakatla on Annette Island. By 1989 the company was flying seven airplanes with 45 employees, and by 1997 28 planes with 175 employees.

=== Kootznoowoo Inc. 50% owner ===
1997 was the year that Kootznoowoo Inc., an Alaska Native Village Corporation for Angoon, became 50% owner, and the same year that the company appeared on the cover of Alaska Business Monthly. At that point they were flying to 30 destinations, they had hubs in both Ketchikan and Sitka, and by flying to British Columbia, they had become an international air carrier. Taquan was now the largest floatplane company in the world, and the second largest commuter airline in Alaska, having boarded 243,000 people in 1997.

This was when Taquan decided to expand from FAR 135 air taxi operation to FAR 121 airline operation. After spending a year to become FAR 121 certified, and buying a couple of British Aerospace Jetstream 32's, the new service was branded as AirOne. The mayor of Juneau helped launch the new venture in March by dedicating one of the planes as The Spirit of Juneau. AirOne commenced operation on June 1, 1998, and began non-stop service from Ketchikan to Juneau. Another route connected Canadian Airlines' hub at Prince Rupert Airport in British Columbia with Alaska Airlines' flights at Ketchikan.

But Taquan Air experienced its first fatal crash with a passenger in August 1998. A new CEO was chosen for Kootznoowoo in July, who had to deal with a "precipitous decline" (Juneau Empire) in the company's outlook. The new CEO foreshadowed future events with the announcement at the shareholders meeting in October 1998, "there is less capital available for new investments." The costs of FAR 121 certification and a slump in the lumber industry led to the AirOne operation ceasing on February 14, 1999. Taquan Air liquidated assets and closed their Sitka hub.

=== Kootznoowoo Inc. ===
Kootznoowoo Inc., acquired full ownership of the company on November 1, 1999, and at the end of December 1999 laid off most or 80 of their workers along with stopping flights to 20 communities. The downsizing at Taquan Air dampened the regional economy. The Juneau Empire wrote about the economic effect on Prince of Wales Island (pop. 6000), which is the fourth-largest island in the US,

The loss of Taquan flights comes at a bad time for Prince of Wales Island, said Tom Briggs, city administrator for Craig. State ferry service for the island was recently reduced to one day a week to save money. "Without a reasonable transportation base, the island's going to be damaged, the economy's going to be damaged and lifestyle's going to be damaged," Briggs said...Blood samples taken at the clinic must be thrown out if they can't get to the lab in Ketchikan on time...The Craig City Council is asking the governor for assistance in the form of increased ferry service.

Flights continued only for government contracts while the ownership looked for a buyer, which occurred in April 2000 (see below). By 2001, Kootznoowoo had divested all of its operating companies, including both the aviation and the timber businesses, and had become a holding company.

=== Venture Travel LLC ===
The general manager for Taquan between 1997 and 2000 had come on board when Taquan acquired the assets of his family's business, Ketchikan Air. He now created a company Venture Travel, LLC. Venture Travel, LLC acquired assets from Taquan in April 2000, including five planes, the name, and the lease in Ketchikan. Taquan Air gained business with U.S. Postal Service contracts for mail routes serving Hyder, Hydaburg, and Behm Canal. Scheduled passenger flights resumed in 2001, also, the airline was awarded the U.S. Forest Service Air Service Contract in both 2000 and 2003 and continues to hold a U.S. Forest Service contract. In October 2007, Taquan moved into a new terminal and hangar building, close to the east terminus of the ferry to the Ketchikan International Airport. The company is now flying to 16 destinations.

=== Small Business Person of the Year for Alaska, 1990 ===
Taquan Air first moved into the spotlight in 1990, when the company's growth and development led to the owner's selection as Alaska Small Business Person of the Year, a selection made by the Alaska office of the U.S. Small Business Administration. In May 1990, the owner was honored in Washington, D.C. at the White House.

=== Medallion Foundation awards and Sen. Ted Stevens ===
Taquan Air participated in a voluntary industry effort in Alaska to improve airline safety called the Medallion Foundation awards. Senator Ted Stevens (R, Alaska) was a decorated World War II pilot who later became floatplane qualified, and who was instrumental in establishing and providing congressional support for the Medallion Foundation. By 2009, Taquan was one of seven airlines out of 37 operating in Alaska to receive all five stars in the program. Senator Stevens presented awards to Taquan in 2005 and 2008.

=== Investigation of Misty Fjords National Monument air-tour-route accident ===
On July 24, 2007, a Taquan Air tour flight, operating a float-equipped de Havilland Canada DHC-2 Beaver and carrying the pilot and four passengers from a cruise ship, impacted mountainous terrain with no survivors. An estimate is that in 2007, 900,000 cruise-ship tourists visited Ketchikan. At the time of this accident, Taquan had commitments regarding sightseeing with each of the cruise lines serving Ketchikan. According to the AP, the cruise line that had booked the tourists severed ties with Taquan after the accident for the remainder of 2007.

The National Transportation Safety Board (NTSB) investigated the accident and issued a report on July 31, 2008, finding that the primary cause of the crash was pilot misjudgment, but that inadequate supervision of the flight tour industry in southeast Alaska by the Federal Aviation Administration (FAA) also contributed to the event. The Board issued four recommendations. The first of these four recommendations, A-08-59, was to install weather cameras on the air tour routes within the Misty Fjords National Monument. Recommendation A-08-60 was to establish monthly ground and en route inspections of air tour flights to observe and enforce safe flying practices. Recommendation A-08-61 was to develop cue-based training for commercial air tour pilots in responding to changing local weather conditions. A-08-62 first needed the completion of A-08-61, and recommended that pilots be required to take the training.

Initial plans were to install 139 weather cameras in Alaska by 2014.

=== Misty Fjords flightseeing ===
Taquan Air is one of several local services to provide air tours of the nearby Misty Fjords National Monument. These flights are associated with the cruise line industry that brings close to a million tourists each Summer to Ketchikan with its 7,000 residents. Adventure guide Inside Passage and Coastal Alaska states, "One of the amazing things about floatplanes is just how smooth <takeoffs> are...unless you're looking out the window and see that there isn't a wake from the floats anymore, it's hard to know you're even in the air." The air tour typically takes two to four hours. The tour goes from seashore up into the mountains and back, during which time the floatplane lands on water in a remote area, and tourists step out on the plane's pontoon.

=== May 2019 accidents ===
In May 2019, two Taquan flights were involved in fatality accidents one week apart. After the second crash on May 20, the NTSB initiated a separate overall investigation of Taquan Air in addition to the accident investigations; the airline declined to comment. Taquan Air suspended all flights on May 21.

Amid increased oversight by the FAA, Taquan resumed limited cargo service on May 23, scheduled passenger flights on May 31, and on-demand sightseeing tours on June 3, 2019.

== Accidents and incidents ==
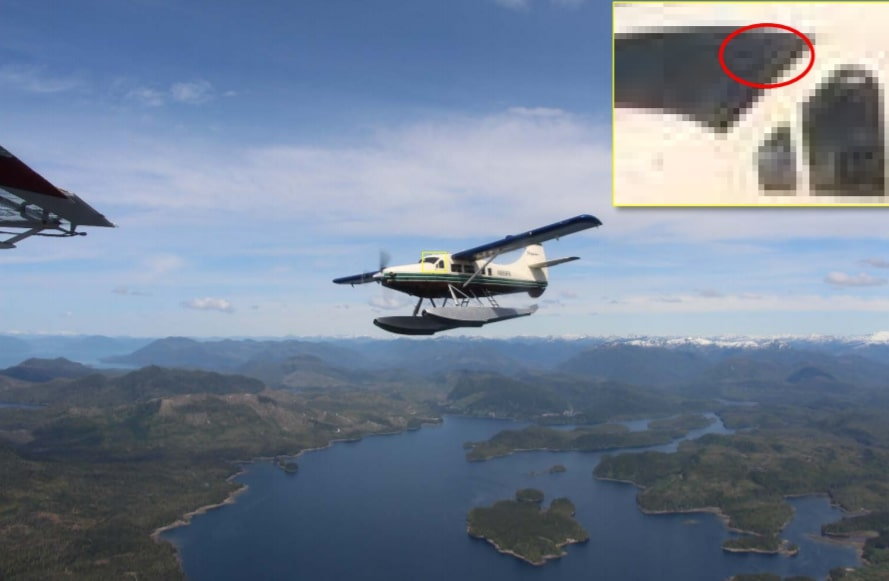
N959PA, a DHC-3 Turbine Otter of Taquan Air, photographed by a passenger on a Mountain Air Service DHC-2 Beaver seconds before a mid-air collision; the DHC-2 was destroyed on impact, while the DHC-3 was able to successfully carry out an forced landing on George Inlet. The circled area on the inset marks a window post that blocked the DHC-3 pilot's view.

- July 24, 2007: A Taquan de Havilland Canada DHC-2 Beaver, registration number N995WA, was conducting an aerial tour of the Misty Fjords when it struck a mountain at an altitude of about 2,500 feet (760 m) above mean sea level (MSL), killing the pilot and four passengers aboard. The pilot of another aircraft that had flown the same route shortly beforehand reported having to descend to 700 feet (210 m) MSL to stay clear of low clouds, rain and fog, and the pilot of a following aircraft had turned back after encountering a "wall of weather" near the crash site. Investigators confirmed that the accident aircraft had flown into rapidly deteriorating weather, and uncovered accusations that Ketchikan aerial tour operators had been routinely flying in marginal weather with little oversight by the local FAA office, which FAA managers attributed to "downsizing". The accident was attributed to "The pilot's decision to continue under visual flight rules into an area of instrument metrological [sic] conditions. Contributing to the accident was the pilot's inadequate weather evaluation, and the FAA's inadequate surveillance of the commercial air tour operator."
- May 13, 2019: A Taquan de Havilland Canada DHC-3 Turbine Otter and a DHC-2 Beaver operated by Mountain Air Service collided in mid-air, killing 1 passenger aboard the Taquan flight and all 5 on board the DHC-2. Both aircraft had been conducting local sightseeing flights of the Misty Fjords from the Ketchikan Harbor Seaplane Base for the benefit of cruise ship passengers. The National Transportation Safety Board (NTSB) attributed the accident to "'the inherent limitations of the see-and-avoid concept" along with the absence of alerts from both airplanes' traffic display systems."
- May 20, 2019: Taquan Air Flight 20, a scheduled DHC-2 Beaver commuter flight from Ketchikan Harbor Seaplane Base to Metlakatla Seaplane Base (MTM), overturned during a water landing on arrival, killing the pilot and single passenger. The accident was attributed to a loss of control stemming from the pilot's inexperience with crosswind landings in seaplanes. The NTSB noted that MTM is subject to rapidly changing wind conditions and downdrafts during weather like that which prevailed on the day of the accident, and this was common knowledge at Taquan; the NTSB faulted the airline for dispatching a newly-hired pilot with little seaplane experience to operate a commuter flight to MTM in such weather.

== Fleet ==
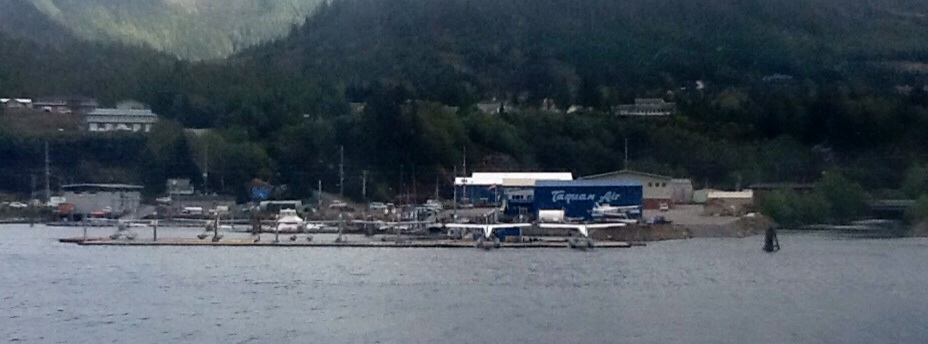
Taquan's seaplane base in Ketchikan

The Taquan Air fleet consists of one Cessna Caravan, eleven de Havilland DHC-2 Beavers, and three de Havilland DHC-3T Turbo Otters certified under FAR part 135 (Air Taxi Operators and Commercial Operators of Small Aircraft).

== Destinations ==
Taquan Air operates scheduled service to the following destinations in Alaska (as of February 2011):

1. Ketchikan (WFB) – Ketchikan Harbor Seaplane Base (FAA: 5KE)
2. Coffman Cove (KCC) – Coffman Cove Seaplane Base
3. Craig / Klawock (CGA) – Craig Seaplane Base
4. Deep Bay / Moser Bay (KMY) – Moser Bay Seaplane Base
5. Dora / Cholmondely Sound (DOF) – Dora Bay Airport
6. Edna Bay (EDA) – Edna Bay Seaplane Base
7. Grace Harbor (GHR)
8. Long Island (LIJ) [seasonal]
9. Hydaburg (HYG) – Hydaburg Seaplane Base
10. Hyder (WHD) – Hyder Seaplane Base (FAA: 4Z7)
11. Metlakatla (MTM) – Metlakatla Seaplane Base
12. Naukati (NKI) – Naukati Bay Seaplane Base (FAA: AK62)
13. Point Baker (KPB) – Point Baker Seaplane Base
14. Port Protection (PPV) – Port Protection Seaplane Base (FAA: 19P)
15. Thorne Bay (KTB) – Thorne Bay Seaplane Base
16. Whale Pass (WWP) – North Whale Seaplane Base (FAA: 96Z)

Other destinations in Alaska (not on schedule as of June 2009):

1. Babe Island (BAI)
2. Bell Island (KBE) – Bell Island Hot Springs Seaplane Base
3. Devenney's (DIV)
4. Bear Valley Lodge (BVL)
5. Calder Bay (CLB)
6. Hollis (HYL) – Hollis Seaplane Base
7. Neets Bay [seasonal]
8. Saltry Cove (SLY)
9. Sunny Cove (SNC)
10. Tenass Pass (TPY)
11. Yes Bay (WYB) – Yes Bay Lodge Seaplane Base (FAA: 78K)

== Aerial photos and maps ==
- "Route Map. Taquan Air - service to 18 communities" (1.6M). Ketchikan, AK: Taquan Air.
- "satellite view of Taquan Air" (Map). Google Maps.

== See also ==
- Capstone Program
- Essential Air Service
- List of seaplane operators
