= Hyder Seek =

Long-distance motorcycle riding

- Genre: Motorcycle rally
- Dates: Summers near Memorial Day
- Locations: Hyder, Alaska, USA
- Years active: 1998–2012
- Founded: 1998, Ron Ayres
- Website: sites.google.com/site/hyderseek2012

Hyder Seek is a long-distance motorcycle riding event (or motorcycle rally) held annually between 1998 and 2012. The destination is Hyder, Alaska, the closest Alaska city to the Lower 48 states that can be reached by road, about 880 miles (1,420 km) from the Sumas, Washington–British Columbia border crossing. (Note: Mileage derived from distances published at The Milepost.)

The ride was established in 1998 when Iron Butt Association rider Ron Ayres set a 49-state record time by riding to Hyder at the end of a 48-state record ride. 2010 was the last year the event was organized by Ron Ayres himself; 2011 and 2012 rallies were self-organized by attendees.
