= Metlakatla Seaplane Base =

Airport in Alaska, United States

- IATA: MTM; ICAO: PAMM; FAA LID: MTM

Summary
- Airport type: Public
- Owner: Alaska DOT&PF - Southeast Region
- Serves: Metlakatla, Alaska
- Elevation AMSL: 0 ft (0 m)
- Coordinates: 55°07′52″N 131°34′41″W

Map
- Location of airport in Alaska

Runways
Direction	Length		Surface
Direction	ft	m	Surface
E/W	5,000	1,524	Water
N/S	5,000	1,524	Water

Statistics (2006)
- Aircraft operations: 325
- Source: Federal Aviation Administration

Metlakatla Seaplane Base (IATA: MTM, ICAO: PAMM, FAA LID: MTM) is a state owned, public use seaplane base located in Metlakatla, a community on Annette Island in the Prince of Wales-Hyder Census Area of the U.S. state of Alaska.

As per Federal Aviation Administration records, the airport had 3,344 passenger boardings (enplanements) in calendar year 2008, 3,403 enplanements in 2009, and 4,140 in 2010. It is included in the National Plan of Integrated Airport Systems for 2011–2015, which categorized it as a non-primary commercial service airport (between 2,500 and 10,000 enplanements per year).

== Facilities and aircraft ==
Metlakatla Seaplane Base has two seaplane landing areas designated E/W and N/S, each measuring 5,000 by 5,000 feet (1,524 x 1,524 m). For the 12-month period ending December 31, 2006, the airport had 325 aircraft operations, an average of 27 per month: 77% air taxi and 23% general aviation.

== Airlines and destinations ==
The following airlines offer scheduled passenger service:

Airlines	Destinations
Pacific Airways	Ketchikan
Promech Air	Ketchikan
Taquan Air	Ketchikan

Carrier shares for January 2011 – December 2011
Carrier	Passengers (arriving and departing)
Pacific	3,650(53.60%)
PM Air, LLC	2,850(41.88%)
Venture	310(4.53%)

Top domestic destinations (January 2011 – December 2011)
Rank	City	Airport	Passengers
1	Ketchikan, AK	Ketchikan Harbor Seaplane Base (WFB)	3,000

== Accidents and incidents ==
- 20 May 2019: Taquan Air Flight 20, a de Havilland Canada DHC-2 Beaver floatplane on a regularly scheduled commuter flight from Ketchikan Harbor Seaplane Base, overturned in the harbor during a water landing, destroying the aircraft and killing both persons aboard. The accident is under investigation by the National Transportation Safety Board.

== See also ==
- List of airports in Alaska
