= Hollis Seaplane Base =

Airport in Alaska, United States

Hollis Clark Bay Seaplane Base
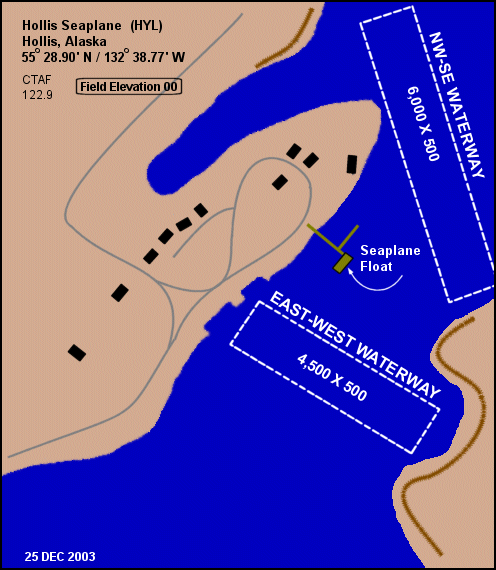
- IATA: HYL; ICAO: none; FAA LID: HYL

Summary
- Airport type: Public
- Owner: State of Alaska DOT&PF – Southeastern Region
- Serves: Hollis, Alaska
- Elevation AMSL: 0 ft (0 m)
- Coordinates: 55°29′26″N 132°37′25″W

Map
- Location of airport in Alaska

Runways
| Direction | Length | | Surface |
| Direction | ft | m | Surface |
|---|---|---|---|
| E/W | 10,000 | 3,048 | Water |

Statistics (2006)
- Aircraft operations: 450
- Source: Federal Aviation Administration

Hollis Clark Bay Seaplane Base (IATA: HYL, FAA LID: HYL) is a state owned, public use seaplane base located one nautical mile (2 km) northeast of the central business district of Hollis, a community in the Prince of Wales-Hyder Census Area in the U.S. state of Alaska. It was formerly known as Hollis Seaplane Base.

As per Federal Aviation Administration records, the airport had 1,661 passenger boardings (enplanements) in calendar year 2008, 1,820 enplanements in 2009, and 1,965 in 2010. It is included in the National Plan of Integrated Airport Systems for 2011–2015, which categorized it as a general aviation facility (the commercial service category requires at least 2,500 enplanements per year).

== Facilities and aircraft ==
Hollis Clark Bay Seaplane Base has one seaplane landing area designated E/W with a water surface measuring 10,000 by 500 feet (3,048 x 152 m). It formerly had two landing areas, a NW/SE waterway measuring 6,000 by 500 feet (1,829 x 152 m) and an E/W waterway that was 4,500 by 500 feet (1,372 x 152 m).

For the 12-month period ending December 31, 2006, the airport had 450 aircraft operations, an average of 37 per month: 89% air taxi and 11% general aviation.

== Airlines and non-stop destinations ==
The following airlines offer scheduled passenger service:

| Airlines | Destinations |
|---|---|
| Pacific Airways | Ketchikan |
| Taquan Air | Ketchikan |

Carrier shares for January 2011 – December 2011
| Carrier | Passengers (arriving and departing) |
|---|---|
| PM Air, LLC | 1,830(49.39%) |
| Pacific | 1,800(48.40%) |
| Venture | 80(2.21%) |

Top domestic destinations (January 2011 – December 2011)
| Rank | City | Airport | Passengers |
|---|---|---|---|
| 1 | Ketchikan, AK | Ketchikan Harbor Seaplane Base (WFB) | 1,000 |

== See also ==
- List of airports in Alaska
