= Thorne Bay Seaplane Base =

Airport in Alaska, United States

- IATA: KTB; ICAO: none; FAA LID: KTB

Summary
- Airport type: Public
- Owner: State of Alaska DOT&PF - Southeast Region
- Serves: Thorne Bay, Alaska
- Elevation AMSL: 0 ft (0 m)
- Coordinates: 55°41′17″N 132°32′12″W

Map
- Location of airport in Alaska

Runways
Direction	Length		Surface
Direction	ft	m	Surface
NW/SE	5,000	1,524	Water

Statistics (2006)
- Aircraft operations: 1,519
- Source: Federal Aviation Administration

Thorne Bay Seaplane Base (IATA: KTB, FAA LID: KTB) is a state-owned public-use seaplane base serving Thorne Bay, a community in the Prince of Wales-Hyder Census Area of the U.S. state of Alaska.

As per Federal Aviation Administration records, the airport had 2,640 passenger boardings (enplanements) in calendar year 2008, 2,283 enplanements in 2009, and 2,608 in 2010. It is included in the National Plan of Integrated Airport Systems for 2011–2015, which categorized it as a non-primary commercial service airport (between 2,500 and 10,000 enplanements per year).

== Facilities and aircraft ==
Thorne Bay Seaplane Base has one seaplane landing area designated NW/SE with a water surface measuring 5,000 by 2,000 feet (1,524 x 610 m). For the 12-month period ending December 31, 2006, the airport had 1,519 aircraft operations, an average of 126 per month: 49.4% air taxi, 42.4% scheduled commercial and 8.2% general aviation.

== Airlines and destinations ==
The following airlines offer scheduled passenger service:

Airlines	Destinations
Pacific Airways	Ketchikan
Promech Air	Ketchikan
Taquan Air	Ketchikan

Carrier shares for January 2011 – December 2011
Carrier	Passengers (arriving and departing)
Pacific	3,040(59.76%)
PM Air, LLC	1,860(36.49%)
Venture	190(3.75%)

Top domestic destinations (January 2011 – December 2011)
Rank	City	Airport	Passengers
1	Ketchikan, AK	Ketchikan Harbor Seaplane Base (WFB)	2,000

== See also ==
- List of airports in Alaska
