= Craig Seaplane Base =

Airport in Alaska, United States

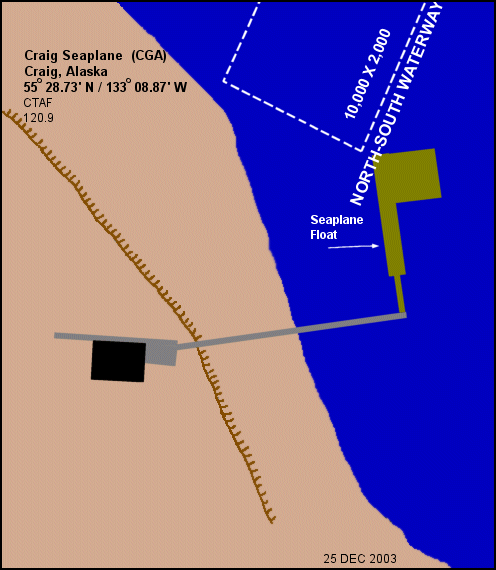
- IATA: CGA; ICAO: none; FAA LID: CGA

Summary
- Airport type: Public
- Owner: City of Craig
- Serves: Craig, Alaska
- Elevation AMSL: 0 ft (0 m)
- Coordinates: 55°28′44″N 133°08′52″W

Map
- Location of airport in Alaska

Runways
Direction	Length		Surface
Direction	ft	m	Surface
N/S	10,000	3,048	Water

Statistics (2016)
- Aircraft operations: 2,000 (2015)
- Based aircraft: 0
- Passengers: 4,858
- Freight: 222,000 lbs
- Source: Federal Aviation Administration

Craig Seaplane Base (IATA: CGA, FAA LID: CGA) is a public use seaplane base owned by and located in Craig, a city in the Prince of Wales-Hyder Census Area of the U.S. state of Alaska.

As per Federal Aviation Administration records, the airport had 5,844 enplanements (passenger boardings) in calendar year 2008, 4,470 enplanements in 2009, and 4,368 in 2010. It is included in the National Plan of Integrated Airport Systems for 2011–2015, which categorized it as a non-primary commercial service airport (between 2,500 and 10,000 enplanements per year).

== Facilities and aircraft ==
Craig Seaplane Base has one seaplane landing area designated N/S with a water surface measuring 10,000 by 2,000 feet (3,048 x 610 m). For the 12-month period ending December 31, 2006, the airport had 2,254 aircraft operations, an average of 187 per month: 78% air taxi and 22% general aviation.

== Airlines and destinations ==
The following airlines offer scheduled passenger service:

Airlines	Destinations
Taquan Air	Ketchikan

Carrier shares for January – December 2015
Carrier	Passengers (arriving and departing)
Pacific	4,350(89.60%)
Venture	510(10.40%)

Top domestic destinations (January – December 2015)
Rank	City	Airport	Passengers
1	(Alaska) Ketchikan, AK	Ketchikan Harbor Seaplane Base (WFB)	2,400

== See also ==
- List of airports in Alaska
