= 2023 Fort Campbell mid-air collision =

Mid-air helicopter crash in Kentucky, United States

Coordinates: 36°39′N 87°28′W

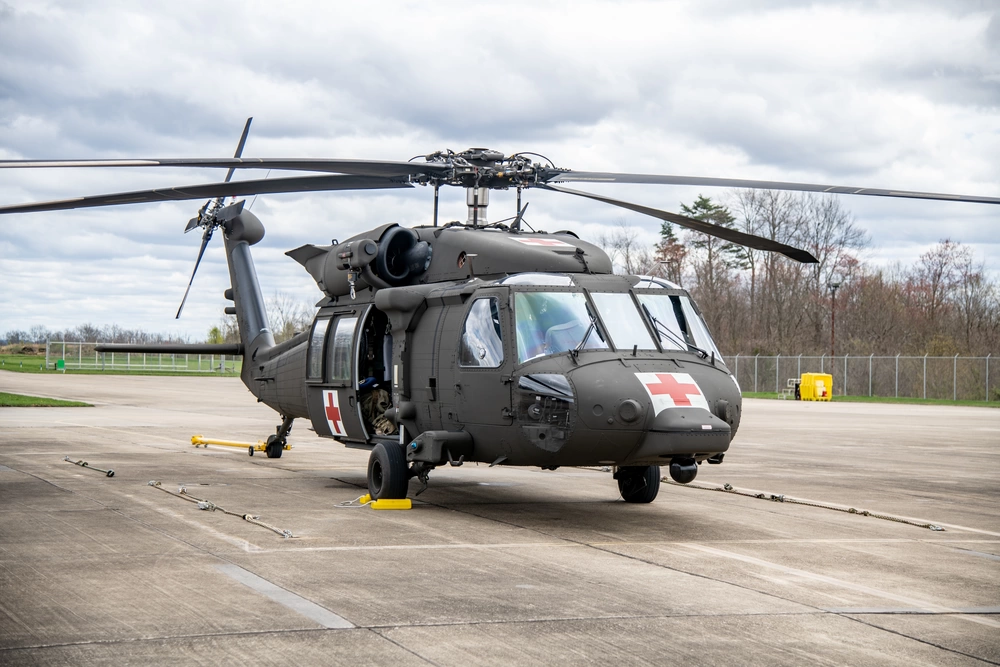
- U.S Army HH-60M MEDEVAC Black Hawk of the West Virginia National Guard’s Company C, 2-104th General Support Aviation Battalion, Aeromedical Evacuation Company

Accident
- Date: March 29, 2023; 2 years ago
- Summary: Mid-air collision, under investigation
- Site: Fort Campbell, Kentucky, United States
- Total fatalities: 9

First aircraft
- Type: HH-60 Black Hawk
- Fatalities: 5

Second aircraft
- Type: HH-60 Black Hawk
- Fatalities: 4

On March 29, 2023, two Sikorsky HH-60 Blackhawk helicopters, both operated by the 101st Airborne Division, collided over Fort Campbell in Trigg County, Kentucky, United States. All nine servicemembers were killed. The flight recorders belonging to the helicopters were found, as well as night-vision goggles used by the pilots during the exercise.

== Crash ==
The crash occurred at around 11 pm (EDT), during a routine training mission over Trigg County, Kentucky. Both helicopters were operated by the 101st Airborne Division. The crash occurred just west of the US Army post of Fort Campbell, near the Kentucky-Tennessee border. A local witness, James Hughes, stated that the helicopters had been flying "pretty low" over local homes when the collision occurred. The weather at the time of the crash was clear.

Early in the morning of 30 March 2023, the 101st Airborne confirmed that there had been a number of casualties. A US Army soldier at the scene informed the local WKDZ-FM radio station that there had been several fatalities and that the county coroner had been called. The Kentucky State Police (KSP) were called at around 10:15 (EST), and rushed to an area of woods and fields. Sarah Burgess, a spokesperson for the KSP, stated that multiple agencies were participating in the investigation, and also stated that no residential areas had been affected.

== Prior incidents ==
The incident was not the first air collision in the vicinity of the post; in March 1988, 17 servicemen were killed when two HH-60 Black Hawks collided doing routine night maneuvers. In 1996, six 101st Airborne Division servicemen were killed when two Army Black Hawk helicopters collided near the post. In 2015, two pilots were killed following a helicopter crash during training. In 2017, four pilots were injured in a similar incident, and in 2018, a helicopter crash nearby killed two people.

== Victims ==
There were no survivors of the incident; all nine servicemen perished. They were: WO1 Jeffrey Barnes, CPL Emilie Marie Eve Bolanos, CW2 Zachary Esparza, SGT Isaacjohn Gayo, SSG Caleb Gore, WO1 Aaron Healy, SSG Taylor Mitchell, CW2 Rusten Smith, and SGT David Solinas Jr.

Three servicemembers were posthumously promoted as follows:

- CPL Emilie Marie Eve Bolanos, promoted to Sergeant.
- CW2 Zachary Esparza, promoted to Chief Warrant Officer Three.
- WO1 Aaron Healy, promoted to Chief Warrant Officer Two.

== Response ==
Kentucky governor Andy Beshear announced the incident on Twitter soon after it occurred, stating that fatalities were expected.

US Senate Minority Leader Mitch McConnell of Kentucky said that he was "devastated", and that his team was in contact with the US Army and authorities on the ground.

== See also ==
- History of the 101st Airborne Division
- 2023 Alaska mid-air collision
- List of accidents and incidents involving helicopters
