= Coffman Cove Seaplane Base =

Airport in Alaska, United States

- IATA: KCC; ICAO: PAKC; FAA LID: KCC

Summary
- Airport type: Public
- Owner: State of Alaska DOT&PF - Southeast Region
- Serves: Coffman Cove, Alaska
- Elevation AMSL: 0 ft (0 m)
- Coordinates: 56°00′53″N 132°50′02″W

Map
- Location of airport in Alaska

Runways
| Direction | Length | | Surface |
| Direction | ft | m | Surface |
|---|---|---|---|
| N/S | 5,000 | 1,524 | Water |

Statistics (2015)
- Aircraft operations: 475
- Based aircraft: 0
- Passengers: 130
- Freight: 94,000 lbs
- Source: Federal Aviation Administration

Coffman Cove Seaplane Base (IATA: KCC, ICAO: PAKC, FAA LID: KCC) is a state-owned public-use seaplane base in Coffman Cove, a city in the Prince of Wales-Hyder Census Area on Prince of Wales Island in the U.S. state of Alaska. It is included in the National Plan of Integrated Airport Systems for 2011–2015, which categorized it as a general aviation facility.

== Facilities and aircraft ==
Coffman Cove Seaplane Base has one seaplane landing area designated N/S, which measures 5,000 by 2,000 feet (1,520 by 610 m). For the 12-month period ending December 31, 2006, the airport had 475 aircraft operations, an average of 39 per month: 84% air taxi and 16% general aviation.

== Airlines and destinations ==
| Airlines | Destinations |
|---|---|
| Taquan Air | Ketchikan Harbor |

=== Statistics ===
Carrier shares: January – December 2016
| Carrier | Passengers (arriving and departing) |
|---|---|
| Venture | 125(100.0%) |

Top domestic destinations: January – December 2016
| Rank | City | Airport | Passengers |
|---|---|---|---|
| 1 | (Alaska) Ketchikan, AK | Ketchikan Harbor Seaplane Base | 49 |

== See also ==
- List of airports in Alaska
