= Hyder, Alaska =

- CDP
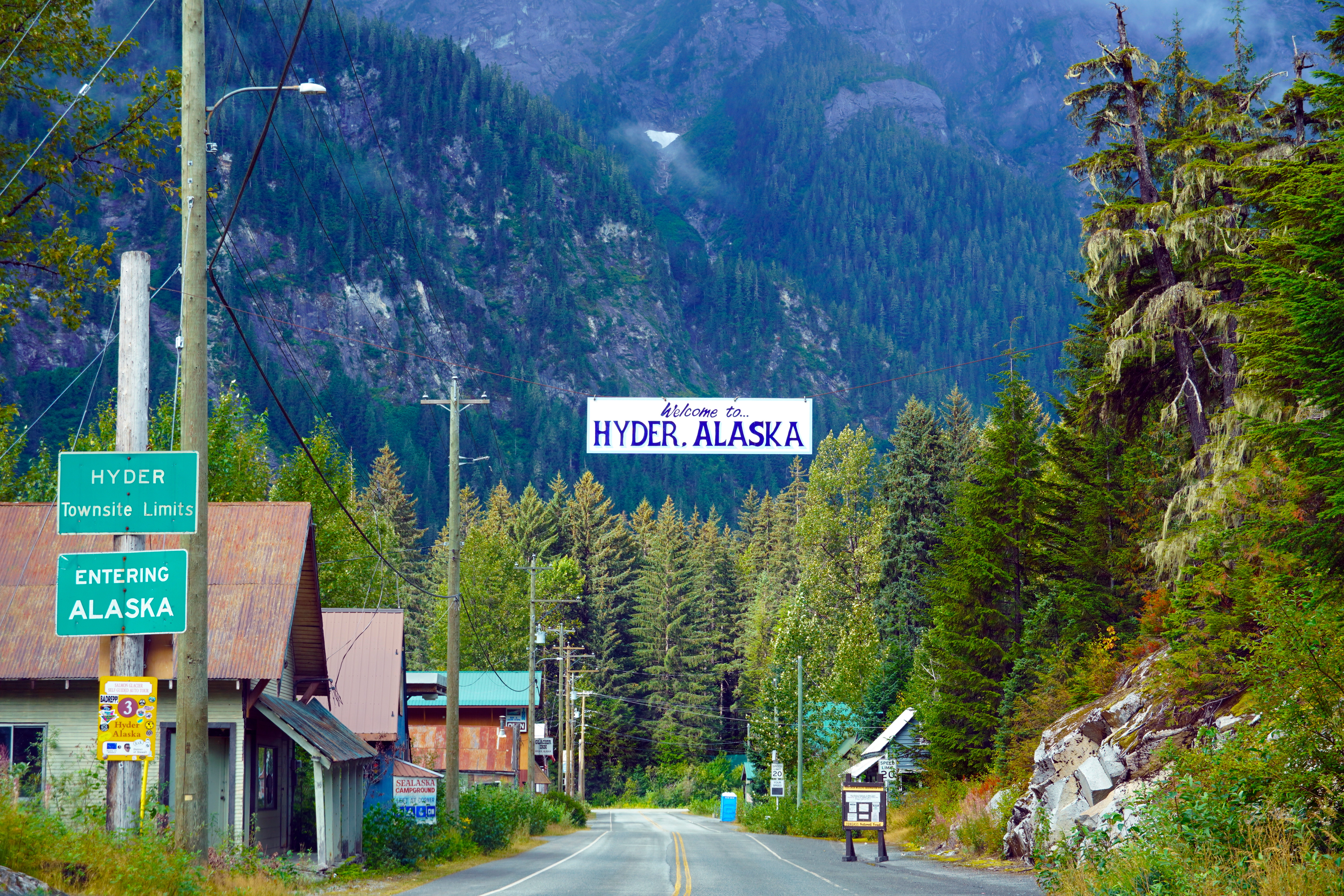
- The border between Stewart, British Columbia, and Hyder, as seen from the Canadian side.

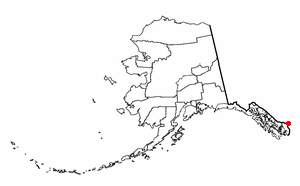
- Location of Hyder, Alaska.
- Coordinates: 55°54′51″N 130°01′28″W
- Country: United States
- State: Alaska
- Census area: Prince of Wales–Hyder
- Established: 1907

Government
  - State senator: Bert Stedman (R)
  - State rep.: Dan Ortiz (I)

Area
  - Total: 17.07 sq mi (44.21 km^{2})
  - Land: 17.07 sq mi (44.21 km^{2})
  - Water: 0 sq mi (0.00 km^{2})
- Elevation: 118 ft (36 m)

Population (2020)
  - Total: 48
  - Density: 2.8/sq mi (1.09/km^{2})
- Time zone: Official time: Alaska (AKST); Unofficial time: PST
  - Summer (DST): Official time: AKDT; Unofficial time: PDT
- ZIP Code: 99923
- Area codes: 236, 250, 672, 778
- FIPS code: 02-34570
- GNIS feature ID: 1422711

Hyder is a census-designated place in Prince of Wales–Hyder Census Area, Alaska, United States. The population was 48 at the 2020 census, down from 87 in 2010. Hyder is accessible by road only from Stewart, British Columbia. It is popular with motorists wishing to visit Alaska without driving the length of the Alaska Highway. Hyder has no direct access to any Alaskan road. It is the southernmost community in the state that can be reached via car (others can be reached only by boat or plane). Hyder is Alaska's easternmost community.

== Geography ==
Hyder is located at the end of the land border between Alaska and British Columbia and at the head of the Portland Canal, a 130-mile (210 km) long fjord which forms a portion of the border at the southeastern edge of the Alaska Panhandle. It sits about 2 miles (3.2 km) from Stewart, British Columbia, by road, and 75 miles (121 km) from Ketchikan by air.

According to the U.S. Census Bureau, the census-designated place (CDP) has a total area of 14.8 square miles (38 km^{2}), all land.

== Climate ==
Hyder has a fairly typical Southeastern Alaskan oceanic climate (Köppen Cfb, borderline Dfb), although using the 0 °C or 32 °F coldest-month isotherm it has an extremely wet and ocean-moderated version of a warm-summer humid continental climate (Köppen Dfb) similar to that of Haines although substantially wetter.

Climate data for Hyder, Alaska (1991–2020 normals, extremes 1936–present)
Month	Jan	Feb	Mar	Apr	May	Jun	Jul	Aug	Sep	Oct	Nov	Dec	Year
Record high °F (°C)	48 (9)	51 (11)	63 (17)	73 (23)	86 (30)	94 (34)	94 (34)	93 (34)	84 (29)	66 (19)	54 (12)	46 (8)	94 (34)
Mean maximum °F (°C)	40.1 (4.5)	42.9 (6.1)	50.6 (10.3)	63.4 (17.4)	76.4 (24.7)	82.5 (28.1)	83.4 (28.6)	81.2 (27.3)	69.4 (20.8)	58.4 (14.7)	45.2 (7.3)	40.4 (4.7)	88.8 (31.6)
Mean daily maximum °F (°C)	31.2 (−0.4)	35.2 (1.8)	42.3 (5.7)	51.2 (10.7)	61.9 (16.6)	66.7 (19.3)	68.1 (20.1)	66.5 (19.2)	58.8 (14.9)	47.9 (8.8)	37.5 (3.1)	32.1 (0.1)	50.0 (10.0)
Daily mean °F (°C)	26.8 (−2.9)	29.7 (−1.3)	34.9 (1.6)	42.0 (5.6)	50.8 (10.4)	57.1 (13.9)	59.7 (15.4)	58.2 (14.6)	52.1 (11.2)	42.3 (5.7)	33.7 (0.9)	28.1 (−2.2)	42.9 (6.1)
Mean daily minimum °F (°C)	22.4 (−5.3)	24.2 (−4.3)	27.5 (−2.5)	32.8 (0.4)	39.7 (4.3)	47.4 (8.6)	51.2 (10.7)	49.9 (9.9)	45.3 (7.4)	36.7 (2.6)	30.0 (−1.1)	24.0 (−4.4)	35.9 (2.2)
Mean minimum °F (°C)	5.6 (−14.7)	8.6 (−13.0)	15.9 (−8.9)	24.6 (−4.1)	32.7 (0.4)	39.8 (4.3)	45.2 (7.3)	42.7 (5.9)	36.6 (2.6)	28.5 (−1.9)	17.5 (−8.1)	10.1 (−12.2)	−0.7 (−18.2)
Record low °F (°C)	−15 (−26)	−3 (−19)	3 (−16)	16 (−9)	28 (−2)	33 (1)	33 (1)	33 (1)	33 (1)	20 (−7)	−1 (−18)	−6 (−21)	−15 (−26)
Average precipitation inches (mm)	11.03 (280)	5.76 (146)	5.95 (151)	4.11 (104)	4.80 (122)	3.48 (88)	4.74 (120)	8.77 (223)	11.19 (284)	12.06 (306)	12.00 (305)	8.64 (219)	92.53 (2,350)
Average snowfall inches (cm)	53.7 (136)	34.7 (88)	27.0 (69)	1.7 (4.3)	0.0 (0.0)	0.0 (0.0)	0.0 (0.0)	0.0 (0.0)	0.0 (0.0)	1.1 (2.8)	31.3 (80)	39.9 (101)	189.4 (481.1)
Average extreme snow depth inches (cm)	42 (110)	50 (130)	45 (110)	30 (76)	5 (13)	0 (0)	0 (0)	0 (0)	0 (0)	1 (2.5)	15 (38)	29 (74)	50 (130)
Average precipitation days (≥ 0.01 in)	22.2	13.8	21.3	16.0	10.4	15.1	17.8	17.0	19.8	18.8	22.4	18.6	213.2
Average snowy days (≥ 0.1 in)	13.0	9.4	8.0	0.8	0.0	0.0	0.0	0.0	0.0	1.2	8.8	12.5	53.7
Source: NOAA(snow depth 2002-2021)

== Demographics ==
Historical population
Census	Pop.	Note	%±
1920	237		—
1930	254		7.2%
1940	72		−71.7%
1950	30		−58.3%
1960	32		6.7%
1970	49		53.1%
1980	77		57.1%
1990	99		28.6%
2000	97		−2.0%
2010	87		−10.3%
2020	48		−44.8%
U.S. Decennial Census

Hyder first appeared on the 1920 U.S. Census as an unincorporated village. It was chosen as the central part of its same-named census-designated place (CDP) in 1980.

As of the census of 2000, there were 97 people, 47 households, and 25 families residing in the CDP. The population density was 6.5 inhabitants per square mile (2.5/km^{2}). There were 72 housing units at an average density of 4.9 per square mile (1.9/km^{2}). The racial makeup of the CDP was 93 White, and 4 from two or more races. There was 1 Hispanic or Latino of any race.

There were 47 households, out of which 9 had children under the age of 18 living with them, 24 were married couples living together, 1 had a female householder with no husband present, and 21 were non-families. 19 of all households were made up of individuals, and 3 had someone living alone who was 65 years of age or older. The average household size was 2.06 and the average family size was 2.81.

In the CDP, the population was spread out, with 18 under 18, 11 from 18 to 24, 16 from 25 to 44, 45 from 45 to 64, and 7 who were 65 or older. The median age was 46 years. There were 44 females and 53 males, of them 34 females were age 18 and over, as were 45 males.

The median income for a household in the CDP was $11,719, and the median income for a family was $30,500. Males had a median income of $56,250 versus $13,750 for females. The per capita income for the CDP was $11,491. There were 44.4% of families and 54.1% of the population living below the poverty line, including 81.0% under 18, and 50.0% over 64.

== Transportation ==
Stewart, British Columbia, immediately borders Hyder and is accessible by road via International Street. Outside of the town site, NFD-88 heads in a northerly direction winding through the Tongass National Forest, and enters the outer extent of Stewart's municipal limits continuing as Granduc Road. There are few local roads, and no roads connect Hyder to any other Alaskan communities, except through Canada. The AMHS ferry that once connected Hyder to Ketchikan stopped running in the 1990s, leaving the Taquan Air floatplane that arrives twice a week with U.S. Mail at Hyder Seaplane Base as the only direct public transportation between Hyder and the rest of Alaska.

== Local services ==
There are a few local services in town:

- US Postal Service
- US Forest Service information kiosk and observation site
- Hyder Community Association, home to a museum, information center and library

== Public utilities ==
Hyder's public utilities are imported from Canada. Electricity is maintained by a subsidiary of BC Hydro, the Tongass Power and Light Company as part of a long-term contract with the town.

While most of Alaska is in area code 907, Hyder shares the Stewart 749 exchange in area code 236, 636 in area code 250, and 794 in area code 778.

== Public safety ==
Alaska State Troopers occasionally patrol the town but do not have a base there. In 1996, a fire consumed the community building which contained the library, post office and fire hall.

The Hyder Volunteer Fire Department was originally formed in 1921. The department was reestablished and registered with the Alaska Department of Public Safety in 2023 after a 25-year absence. There are currently no emergency medical services established in Hyder.

A Canada Border Services Agency customs post is on the only connecting road out of Hyder, and there is no complementary American border patrol presence.

== History ==
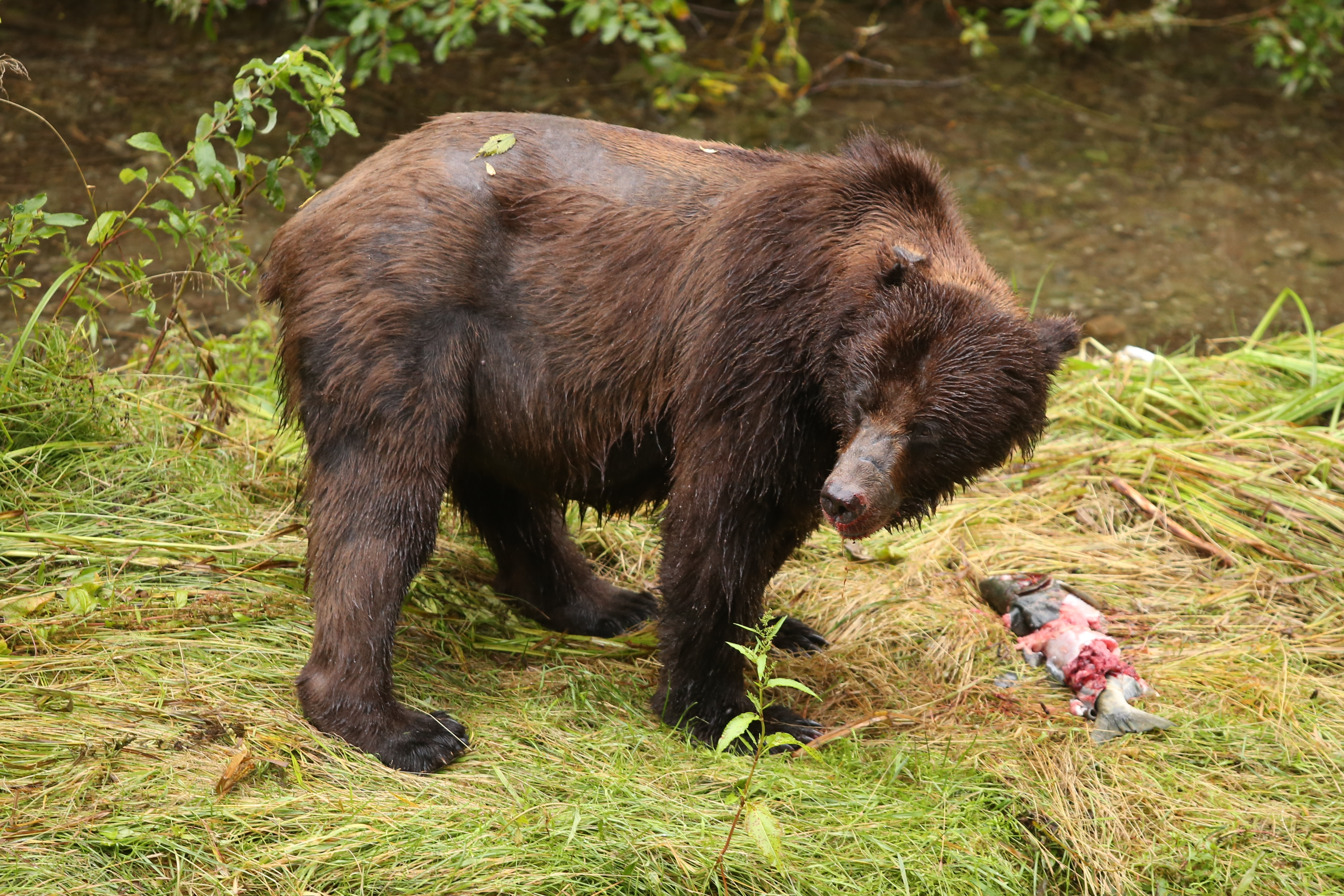
Grizzly bear at the Fish Creek Wildlife Observation Site near Hyder.

The Nisga'a, who lived around the Nass River, called the head of Portland Canal "Skam-A-Kounst," meaning safe place, probably because it served them as a retreat from the harassment of the Haidas on the coast. They traveled in the area seasonally to pick berries.

The area around the Portland Canal was explored in 1896 by Captain D.D. Gaillard of the U.S. Army Corps of Engineers.

In 1898, gold and silver lodes were discovered in the region, mainly on the Canadian side, in the upper Salmon River basin. The Stewart brothers, for whom the British Columbia town was named, arrived in 1902.

Hyder was established in 1907 as "Portland City", after the canal. In 1914, when the US Post Office Department told residents that there were many U.S. communities named Portland, it was renamed Hyder, after Frederick Hyder, a Canadian mining engineer who envisioned a bright future for the area. Hyder was the only practical point of access to the silver mines in Canada; the community became the port, supply point, and post office for miners by 1917. Hyder's boom years were the 1920s, when the Riverside Mine on the U.S. side extracted gold, silver, copper, lead, zinc, and tungsten. The mine operated from 1924 to 1950.

In 1928, the Hyder business district was consumed by fire. By 1956 all significant mining had ceased, except for the Granduc Mine on the Canadian side, which operated until 1984 and 2010 to present. Westmin Resources Ltd operated a gold and silver mine on the Canadian side in Premier, British Columbia, but is not currently active.

== Culture ==
Hyder is accessible by highway from Stewart, which connects with the British Columbia highway system. In the mid-2010s, Hyder residents said that more than 100,000 tourists came to Hyder annually. It is the location of the annual Hyder Seek gathering of long-distance motorcyclists who travel from all over North America each Memorial Day weekend. It became popular with long-distance motorcycle riders in 1998, when author Ron Ayres set a record of riding to the contiguous 48 states in six days. Ayres went on to add to the 48-state record by continuing on to Hyder to establish a new 49-state record of 7 days, 0 hours and 20 minutes. Ayres named the new long distance ride the "48 Plus" and it has become popular with members of the long-distance motorcycle riding Iron Butt Association. Hyder was the starting point of the 2014 coast-to-coast Scooter Cannonball Run, which ended in New Orleans, Louisiana.

Because of its accessible proximity to Stewart, and its isolation from other communities in Alaska, Hyder has many commonalities with its Canadian neighbor, with both American and Canadian holidays observed, and a shared international Chamber of Commerce. Although Hyder is officially in the Alaska Time Zone, residents set their clocks to British Columbia's Pacific Time. Both American and Canadian currency are accepted, except by the U.S. Post Office, which only accepts U.S. dollars.

A local tradition is known as being "Hyderized", with two of the town's bars issuing certificates to patrons who consume a shot of 151 proof (75.5% alcohol) Everclear.

== Education ==
Southeast Island School District operates the Hyder School.

Children who live in Hyder have attended the Bear Valley School in Stewart, but Hyder has a school when the community meets the Alaska minimum of 10 children for the state to provide a teacher.

== References in popular culture ==
At the border crossing to Stewart, there is a humorous imitation of a sign at the historic Berlin border crossing Checkpoint Charlie with the inscription "You are leaving the American Sector" in English, French, and German, as well as a sign reading "Eastern Sektor". The sign was erected in 2015 as a protest after the Canadian administration announced plans to close the border control at night.

== See also ==
- Hyder–Stewart Border Crossing
- Alaska boundary dispute
- Storehouse No. 4
