= Hyder Seaplane Base =

- IATA: WHD; ICAO: none; FAA LID: 4Z7

Summary
- Airport type: Public
- Owner: Alaska DOT&PF - Southeast Region
- Serves: Hyder, Alaska
- Elevation AMSL: 0 ft (0 m)
- Coordinates: 55°54′12″N 130°00′24″W

Map
- Location of airport in Alaska

Runways
Direction	Length		Surface
Direction	ft	m	Surface
N/S	10,000	3,048	Water

Statistics (2006)
- Aircraft operations: 105
- Source: Federal Aviation Administration

Hyder Seaplane Base (IATA: WHD, FAA LID: 4Z7) is a state owned, public use seaplane base located one nautical mile (2 km) southeast of the central business district of Hyder, a community in the Prince of Wales-Hyder Census Area of the U.S. state of Alaska. It is included in the National Plan of Integrated Airport Systems for 2011–2015, which categorized it as a general aviation facility. It shares its airspace with the nearby Stewart Aerodrome and Stewart Water Aerodrome and its water runway in the Portland Canal exists on the Canada–United States border.

== Facilities and aircraft ==
Hyder Seaplane Base has one seaplane landing area designated N/S with a water surface measuring 10,000 by 1,000 feet (3,048 x 305 m). For the 12-month period ending December 31, 2006, the airport had 105 aircraft operations, an average of 8 per month: 95% air taxi and 5% general aviation.

There are two floats for seaplanes, one along the shoreline and another within a protected cove with a concrete launch ramp. The floats are shared with vessels that dock at the base.

== Airlines and destinations ==
Airlines	Destinations
Taquan Air	Ketchikan
SeaWind Aviation	Ketchikan

The Hyder Seaplane Base uses Pacific Time Zone for e.g. flight schedule as is done in western Canada and in general in Hyder, but different from the rest of Alaska which uses Alaska Time Zone.

== See also ==
- List of airports in Alaska
