= North Whale Seaplane Base =

Airport in Alaska, United States

- IATA: WWP; ICAO: none; FAA LID: 96Z

Summary
- Airport type: Public
- Owner: State of Alaska DOT&PF - Southeast Region
- Serves: North Whale Pass, Alaska
- Elevation AMSL: 0 ft (0 m)
- Coordinates: 56°06′59″N 133°07′18″W

Map
- Location of airport in Alaska

Runways
Direction	Length		Surface
Direction	ft	m	Surface
NW/SE	10,000	3,048	Water

Statistics (2006)
- Aircraft operations: 350
- Source: Federal Aviation Administration

North Whale Seaplane Base (IATA: WWP, FAA LID: 96Z) is a state owned, public use seaplane base located in North Whale Pass, a community in the Prince of Wales-Hyder Census Area of the U.S. state of Alaska. It is included in the National Plan of Integrated Airport Systems for 2011–2015, which categorized it as a general aviation facility.

== Facilities and aircraft ==
North Whale Seaplane Base has one seaplane landing area designated NW/SE with a water surface measuring 10,000 by 1,000 feet (3,048 x 305 m). For the 12-month period ending December 31, 2006, the airport had 350 aircraft operations, an average of 29 per month: 86% air taxi and 14% general aviation.

== Airlines and destinations ==
Airlines	Destinations
Taquan Air	Ketchikan Harbor

== See also ==
- List of airports in Alaska
