= Hydaburg Seaplane Base =

- IATA: HYG; ICAO: PAHY; FAA LID: HYG

Summary
- Airport type: Public
- Owner: Alaska DOT&PF - Southeast Region
- Serves: Hydaburg, Alaska
- Elevation AMSL: 0 ft (0 m)
- Coordinates: 55°12′23″N 132°49′42″W

Map
- Location of airport in Alaska

Runways
Direction	Length		Surface
Direction	ft	m	Surface
E/W	5,000	1,524	Water

Statistics (2006)
- Aircraft operations: 1,000
- Source: Federal Aviation Administration

Hydaburg Seaplane Base (IATA: HYG, ICAO: PAHY, FAA LID: HYG) is a state owned, public use seaplane base located in Hydaburg, a city in the Prince of Wales-Hyder Census Area of the U.S. state of Alaska. It is included in the National Plan of Integrated Airport Systems for 2011–2015, which categorized it as a general aviation facility.

== Facilities and aircraft ==
Hydaburg Seaplane Base has one seaplane landing area designated E/W with a water surface measuring 5,000 by 2,000 feet (1,524 x 610 m). For the 12-month period ending December 31, 2006, the airport had 1,000 aircraft operations, an average of 83 per month: 50% air taxi and 50% general aviation.

== Airlines and destinations ==
The following airline service is subsidized by the United States Department of Transportation via the Essential Air Service program.

Airlines	Destinations
Taquan Air	Ketchikan Harbor

== See also ==
- List of airports in Alaska

== Other sources ==
- Essential Air Service documents (Docket DOT-OST-1999-6245) from the U.S. Department of Transportation:
  - Order 2005-10-7 ( October 11, 2005): re-selecting Venture Travel, LLC, d/b/a Taquan Air, to provide essential air service at Hydaburg, Alaska, at the annual subsidy rate of $54,733 per year for the two-year period November 1, 2005, through October 31, 2007.
  - Order 2007-10-12 (October 11, 2007): re-selecting Venture Travel, LLC, d/b/a Taquan Air Service, to provide essential air service (EAS) at Hydaburg, Alaska, for the four-year period beginning November 1, 2007, at an annual subsidy rate of $86,755.
  - Order 2011-7-12 (July 27, 2011): re-selecting Venture Travel, LLC, operating as Taquan Air Service (Taquan Air), to provide essential air service (EAS) at Hydaburg, Alaska. Taquan Air will provide three weekly nonstop round trips to Ketchikan using 6-seat de Havilland Canada DHC-2 Beaver aircraft for a four-year contract period beginning November 1, 2011, through October 31, 2015, for an annual subsidy of $151,773.
