= Ketchikan Harbor Seaplane Base =

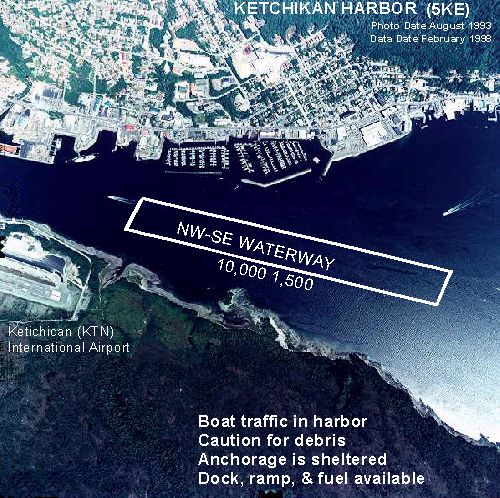
- IATA: WFB; ICAO: none; FAA LID: 5KE

Summary
- Airport type: Public use
- Serves: Ketchikan, Alaska
- Elevation AMSL: 0 ft (0 m)
- Coordinates: 55°20′40″N 131°39′48″W

Map
- Location of airport in Alaska

Runways
Direction	Length		Surface
Direction	ft	m	Surface
E/W	3,893	1,187	Water

Statistics (2006)
- Aircraft operations: 10,450
- Based aircraft: 51
- Source: Federal Aviation Administration

Ketchikan Harbor Seaplane Base (IATA: WFB, FAA LID: 5KE) is a privately owned, public use seaplane base located at the harbor of Ketchikan, a city in the Ketchikan Gateway Borough of the U.S. state of Alaska. It is located near the Ketchikan International Airport, which also has its own seaplane landing area. Prior to the opening of the Ketchikan International Airport in 1973, scheduled passenger seaplane service was operated with amphibian aircraft between the seaplane base and the Annette Island Airport located approximately 20 miles south, as this land plane airfield previously served as the primary airport for Ketchikan, with scheduled airline flights being operated by Pan American World Airways, Pacific Northern Airlines and Western Airlines into Annette Island over the years.

As per Federal Aviation Administration records, the airport had 38,945 passenger boardings (enplanements) in calendar year 2008, 40,462 enplanements in 2009, and 43,737 in 2010.

== Facilities and aircraft ==
Ketchikan Harbor Seaplane Base has one seaplane landing area designated NW/SE which measures 10,000 x 1,500 ft. (3,048 x 457 m)

For the 12-month period ending December 31, 2006, the airport had 10,450 aircraft operations, an average of 28 per day. At that time there were 51 aircraft based at this airport.

== Airlines and destinations ==
The following airlines offer scheduled passenger service:

Airlines	Destinations
Taquan Air	Coffman Cove, Craig, Edna Bay, Hollis, Hydaburg, Hyder, Metakatla, Naukati, Point Baker, Port Protection, Thorne Bay, Whale Pass

Carrier shares for January 2011 – December 2011
Carrier	Passengers (arriving and departing)
Pacific	13,660(63.93%)
PM Air, LLC	5,910(27.64%)
Venture	1,800(8.43%)

Top domestic destinations (January 2011 – December 2011)
Rank	City	Airport	Passengers
1	Metlakatla, AK	Metlakatla Seaplane Base (MTM)	3,000
2	Craig, AK	Craig Seaplane Base (CGA)	3,000
3	Thorne Bay, AK	Thorne Bay Seaplane Base (KTB)	2,000
4	Hollis, AK	Hollis Seaplane Base (HYL)	2,000

== See also ==
- List of airports in Alaska
