= 2023 Alaska mid-air collision =

Between two AH-64 Apache helicopters

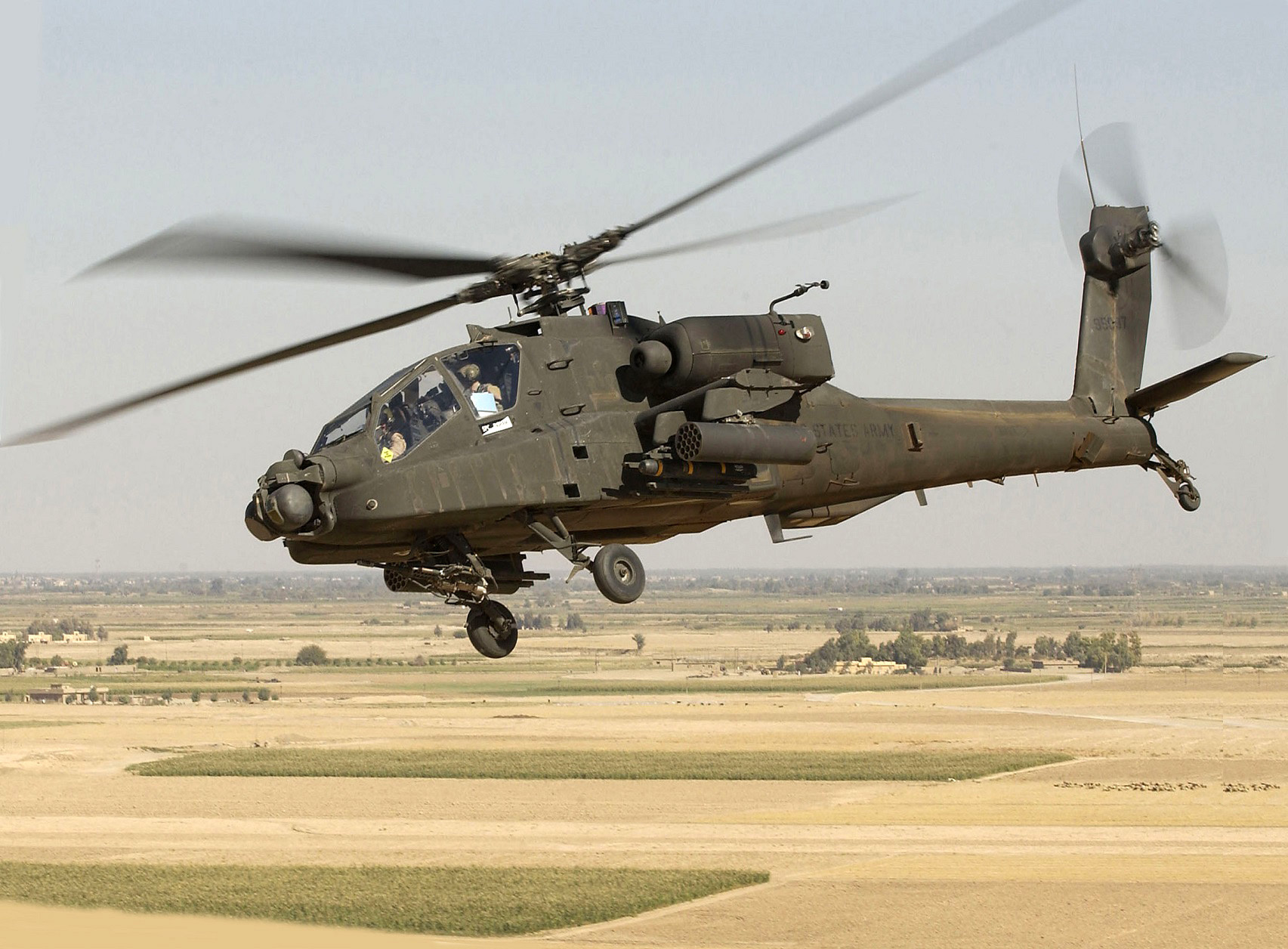
- An AH-64, similar to both aircraft involved

Accident
- Date: 27 April 2023; 3 years ago
- Summary: Mid-air collision; under investigation
- Site: Healy, Alaska, United States
- Total fatalities: 3
- Total injuries: 1
- Total survivors: 1

First aircraft
- Type: Boeing AH-64 Apache
- Destination: Fort Wainwright, Fairbanks, Alaska, United States

Second aircraft
- Type: Boeing AH-64 Apache
- Destination: Fort Wainwright, Fairbanks, Alaska, United States

On 27 April 2023, two AH-64 Apache helicopters belonging to the 1st Attack Reconnaissance Battalion, 25th Aviation Regiment, at Fort Wainwright, collided near Healy, Alaska, approximately 80 miles (130 kilometres) south of Fairbanks, when returning from an exercise mission. The incident resulted in three military personnel killed with another one injured. It happened barely one month after two Black Hawk helicopters crashed in Kentucky, leading the US Army to halt all its aircraft, with the exception of those on "critical missions".

== The incident ==
The two AH-64 Apache helicopters which were with the 1st Attack Reconnaissance Battalion, 25th Aviation Regiment, were moving from a mission in the Donnelly Training Area to Fort Wainwright on 27 April 2023, when they collided at 1:39 pm (local time). The incident took place roughly 50 miles (80 kilometres) east of Healy.

Two of the four troops were pronounced dead at the incident scene, while a third died en route to a Fairbanks hospital. The Army stated that the event was being investigated, and withheld the identities of the killed individuals until their relatives could be notified.

== Aftermath ==
The United States Army indicated one day after the incident that it had suspended aviation units for training after 12 troops died in helicopter crashes in Alaska and Kentucky over the previous month. According to the Army notification, the action halted all Army aviators, excluding those engaging in crucial missions, until they finished the necessary training.

== See also ==
- 2019 George Inlet mid-air collision
- 2020 Soldotna mid-air collision
- 2023 Fort Campbell mid-air collision
