= George Inlet =

Bay in Alaska, United States

Coordinates: 55.41639°N 131.48139°W

George Inlet (also George Arm) is a bay in the U.S. state of Alaska. It is situated within the Alexander Archipelago at the southern shore of Revillagigedo Island. It was named by the United States Coast and Geodetic Survey in 1880 after pilot W. E. George, who created the first sketch of Revillagigedo Channel and Tongass Narrows.

== Geography ==
George Inlet is a deep indentation of the southwestern coast line of Revillagigedo Island. The bed rock is chiefly black phyllite and slates of the Ketchikan series. The boundary of the granite of the Coast Range is probably 2–3 miles (3.2–4.8 km) to the northeast of the upper end of the inlet. The argillite series is often graphitic, and usually closely folded. Some belts of limestone occur with the Ketchikan series near the upper end of the inlet. Greenstones were found not to be so prevalent a rock type as elsewhere in the Ketchikan series. Near the entrance the two shores of the inlet are formed by granite, which occurs in the phyllites as an intrusive stock. The ore deposits are of two classes—first, the gold-bearing veins, and second, the galena- and zinc-bearing veins. ABoth classes of veins cut the foliation of the country rock. Prospecting has occurred here.

== Aviation accident ==
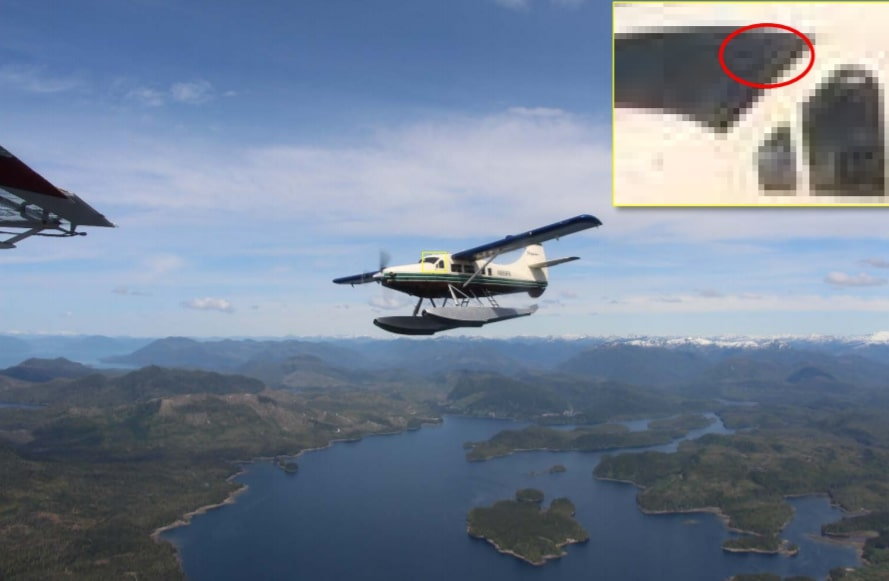
N959PA taken from N952DB just before the collision; the red oval illustrates the window post blocking the pilot's view

On May 13, 2019, a de Havilland DHC-2 (registration N952DB) and a de Havilland DHC-3 (N959PA) collided over George Inlet, resulting six fatalities (all five people aboard the DHC-2 and one passenger in the DHC-3). The National Transportation Safety Board's (NTSB) investigation found that the probable cause of the accident was the inherent limitations of the see-and-avoid concept, which prevented the two pilots from seeing the other airplane before the collision, and the absence of visual and aural alerts from both airplanes’ traffic display systems, while operating in a geographic area with a high concentration of air tour activity. Contributing to the accident were (1) the Federal Aviation Administration’s provision of new transceivers that lacked alerting capability to Capstone Program operators without adequately mitigating the increased risk associated with the consequent loss of the previously available alerting capability and (2) the absence of a requirement for airborne traffic advisory systems with aural alerting among operators who carry passengers for hire."
