= List of disasters in Alaska by death toll =

This list of disasters in Alaska by death toll includes major disasters (excluding acts of war) that occurred in Alaska.

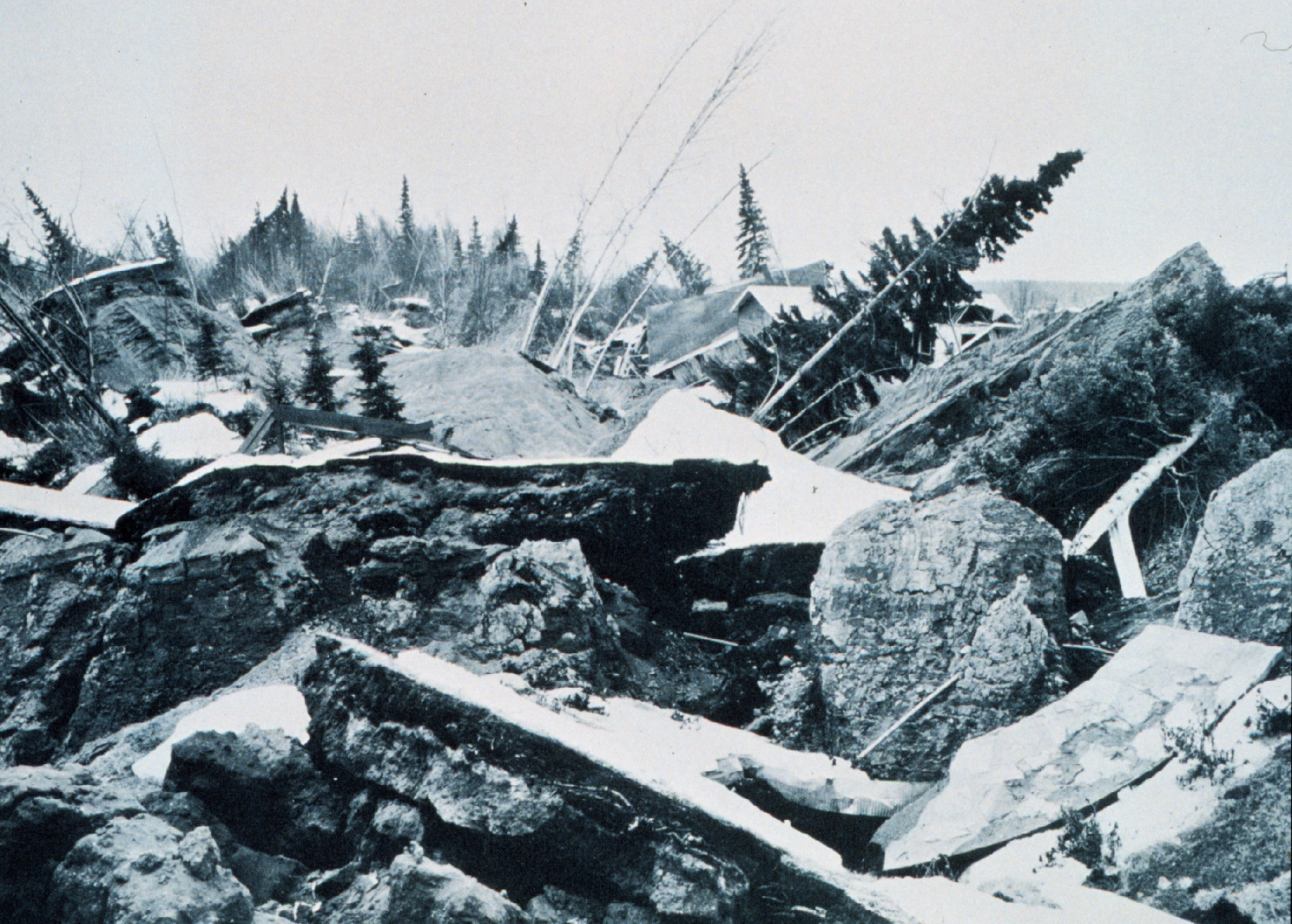
Aftermath of the 1964 Alaska earthquake in Turnagain Arm. The 1964 Good Friday earthquake is one of the deadliest disasters in Alaskan history.

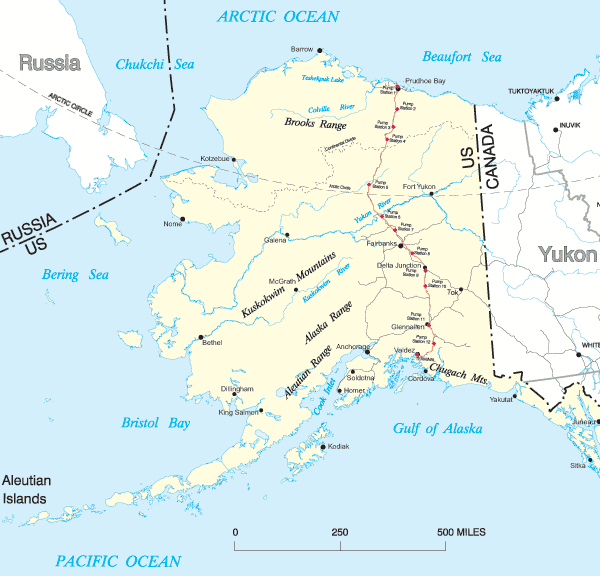
Map of Alaska

== 100 or more deaths ==
Fatalities	Year	Article	Type	Location	Comments
1,000+	1878-1880	St. Lawrence Island famine	Famine	St. Lawrence Island	
364	1918	SS Princess Sophia	Shipwreck	Vanderbilt Reef	
200	1799	Hinchinbrook Entrance disaster	Maritime disaster	Hinchinbrook Entrance	Sixty bidarkas (native boats) were sunk in a violent storm.
115	1964	1964 Alaska earthquake	Earthquake and tsunami	South-central Alaska	There were 16 other fatalities outside of Alaska from the disaster.
111	1971	Alaska Airlines Flight 1866	Plane crash	Alexander Archipelago	
110	1908	Sinking of the Star of Bengal	Shipwreck	off of Coronation Island	
103	1799	Loss of the Phoenix	Shipwreck	Bering Sea	
101	1963	Northwest Orient Airlines Flight 293	Plane crash	Clarence Strait	

== 10 to 99 deaths ==
Fatalities	Year	Article	Type	Location	Comments
77	1890	Wreck of the Oneida	Shipwreck	Hennig Rock	
69-70	1978	Sinking of the MV Chandragupta	Shipwreck	Southwest of Kodiak Island	
56	1965	1965 Soviet fishing fleet disaster	Maritime disaster	Between St. Matthew Island and the Pribilof Islands	Loss of the Boksetegorsk, Nahichevan, Sebezh, and Sevsk in one storm.
52	1952	1952 Mount Gannett C-124 crash	Plane crash	Mount Gannett	
47	1970	Capitol International Airways Flight C2C3/26	Plane crash	Ted Stevens Anchorage International Airport	
42	1901	Sinking of the SS Islander	Shipwreck	Lynn Canal	
39	1968	Wien Consolidated Airlines Flight 55	Plane crash	Pedro Bay	
39	1910	Mexican Gold Mine Disaster	Explosion	Douglas Island	
37	1967	Loss of the SS Panoceanic Faith	Shipwreck	Southwest of Kodiak Island	
34-49	1813	Sinking of the Neva	Shipwreck	near Kruzof Island	
34	1916	Sinking of the Onward Ho!	Shipwreck	off of Cape Fairweather	
34	1932	Wreck of the Nevada	Shipwreck	Amatignak Island	
32	1982	Loss of the Akebono Maru No. 28	Shipwreck	North of Adak Island	
32	1895	Loss of the Walter A. Earle	Shipwreck	Off of Cape St. Elias	
32	1964	Wreck of the San Patrick	Shipwreck	Ulak Island	
31-32	1913	Wreck of the SS State of California	Shipwreck	Gambier Bay	
30	1972	Loss of the Pacrover	Shipwreck	South of Kodiak	
30	1967	Sam Su disaster	Maritime disaster	SW of Adak Island	
30	1948	Northwest Orient Airlines Flight 4422	Plane crash	Mount Sanford	
30	1903	Loss of the Discovery	Shipwreck	Near Lituya Bay	
26	1981	Loss of the Daito Maru No. 55	Shipwreck	NW of Adak	
25-40	1898	Clara Nevada disaster	Shipwreck	off Skagway	
25	1894	Sinking of the SV James Allen	Shipwreck	Amlia Island	
25	1888	Wreck of the Ohio	Shipwreck	near Point Hope	
24	1995	1995 Alaska Boeing E-3 Sentry accident	Plane crash	near Elmendorf Air Force Base	
24	1981	Fire onboard the Dae Rim	Ship fire	West of Attu Island	
18	1947	Pan Am Flight 923	Plane crash	Annette Island	
18	1987	Ryan Air Flight 103	Plane crash	Homer	
18	1986	Disappearance of the Chil Bo San No. 1	Shipwreck	Bering Sea NW of Adak Island	Lost en route to Alaska from Hokkaido.
18	1976	Loss of the Carnelian-I	Shipwreck	South of Adak Island	
18	1898	Sinking of the Jessie	Shipwreck	Kuskokwim River	
18	1886	Sinking of the Flying Scud	Shipwreck	near Karluk	
17	1758	Wreck of the Sv. Kapiton	Shipwreck	near Kiska Island	
16	1946	Wreck of the Donbass	Shipwreck	South of Adak	
16	1897	Wreck of the Navarch	Shipwreck	Off Blossom Shoals	
16	1858	Wreck of the Napoleon III	Shipwreck	St. Paul Island	
15	2001	Sinking of the Arctic Rose	Shipwreck	NW of St. Paul Island	
15	1955	1955 Eielson Air Force Base disaster	Plane crash	Eielson Air Force Base	15 killed on the ground.
15	1936	1936 Juneau landslide	Landslide	Juneau	
14	1966	Lane Hotel fire	Arson	Anchorage	
14	1984	Collision between the Kyowa Maru and the Anyo Maru	Ship collision	North of Atka	
14	1967	1967 US Navy Lockheed P-2 Neptune crash	Plane crash	Mount Fairweather	
14	1960	Pacific Northern Flight 201	Plane crash	Mount Gilbert	
14	1937	Jonesville Mine disaster	Explosion	Matanuska Valley near Sutton	
13	1977	AAI Flight 302	Plane crash	Iliamna	
12	1999	Sinking of the Anyo Maru No 1	Shipwreck	Bering Sea	
12	1978	1978 Webber Airlines Grumman G-21A Goose crash	Plane crash	near Laboucher Bay	
12	1964	1964 US Navy Lockheed P-2 Neptune crash	Plane crash	Cape Newenham	
12	1939	Sinking of the Oduno	Shipwreck	off Noyes Island	
12	1905	Loss of the Nellie Coleman	Shipwreck	off Cape Yakataga	
11	1956	Crash of The Golden Heart	Plane crash	near Eielson Air Force Base	
10	2025	Bering Air Flight 445	Plane crash	Over Norton Sound	
10	2013	2013 Rediske Air DHC-3 crash	Plane crash	Soldotna Airport	
10	1981	St. Patrick Disaster	Maritime disaster	Near Marmot Bay	
10	1975	Wien Air Alaska Flight 99	Plane crash	Sevuokuk Mountain near Gambell Airport	
10	1973	1973 US Navy Douglas DC-6 crash	Plane crash	Great Sitkin Island	
10	1961	1961 US Navy Martin P5M-2 Marlin crash	Plane crash	Montague Island	

== Other notable disasters ==
- Loss of the Aleutian Enterprise (9 killed)
- North Pacific Airlines Flight 1802 (9 killed)
- 1989 RCAF Lockheed CC-130E Hercules crash (9 killed)
- Tyee Airlines Flight 906 (8 killed)
- Loss of the Eagle (8 killed)
- 1985 Savoonga disaster (8 killed)
- Disappearance of the F/V Pacesetter (7 killed)
- Sinking of the USLHT Armeria (7 killed)
- 2020 Alaska mid-air collision (7 killed)
- Sinking of the Katmai (7 killed)
- Loss of the Americus (7 killed)
- Loss of the Altair (7 killed)
- 1967 Mount McKinley disaster (7 killed)
- 2019 Alaska mid-air collision (6 killed)
- Loss of the Destination (6 killed)
- Loss of the Western Sea (6 killed)
- Sinking of the MV Selendang Ayu (6 killed)
- 1967 Fairbanks flood (6 killed)
- Alaska Airlines Flight 779 (6 killed)
- Loss of the Northwest Mariner (6 killed)
- Loss of the Barbarossa (6 killed)
- Wrangell landslide (6 killed)
- 2021 Knik Glacier helicopter crash (5 killed)
- 2018 K2 Aviation DHC-2 crash (5 killed)
- 2011 Pacific Alaska Shellfish Company skiff disaster (5 killed)
- Sinking of the FV Big Valley (5 killed)
- Sinking of the Lin-J (5 killed)
- Sinking of the Emerald Sea (5 killed)
- Universe Explorer fire (5 killed)
- Loss of the Lou Ann (5 killed)
- Loss of the Nettie H (5 killed)
- 2010 Alaska DHC-3 crash (5 killed)
- Sinking of the FV Alaska Ranger (5 killed)
- Loss of the Fierce Competitor (5 killed)
- 1958 Lituya Bay earthquake and megatsunami (5 killed)
- Scotch Cap Light disaster (5 killed)
- 1993 Parks Highway head-on collision (5 killed)
- 1981 Denali National Park tour bus crash (5 killed)
