= 2016 Sunbird Aviation Britten-Norman Islander crash =

Aviation accident in Papua New Guinea

Coordinates: 6°7′32.4″S 141°16′55.2″E

2016 Sunbird Aviation crash
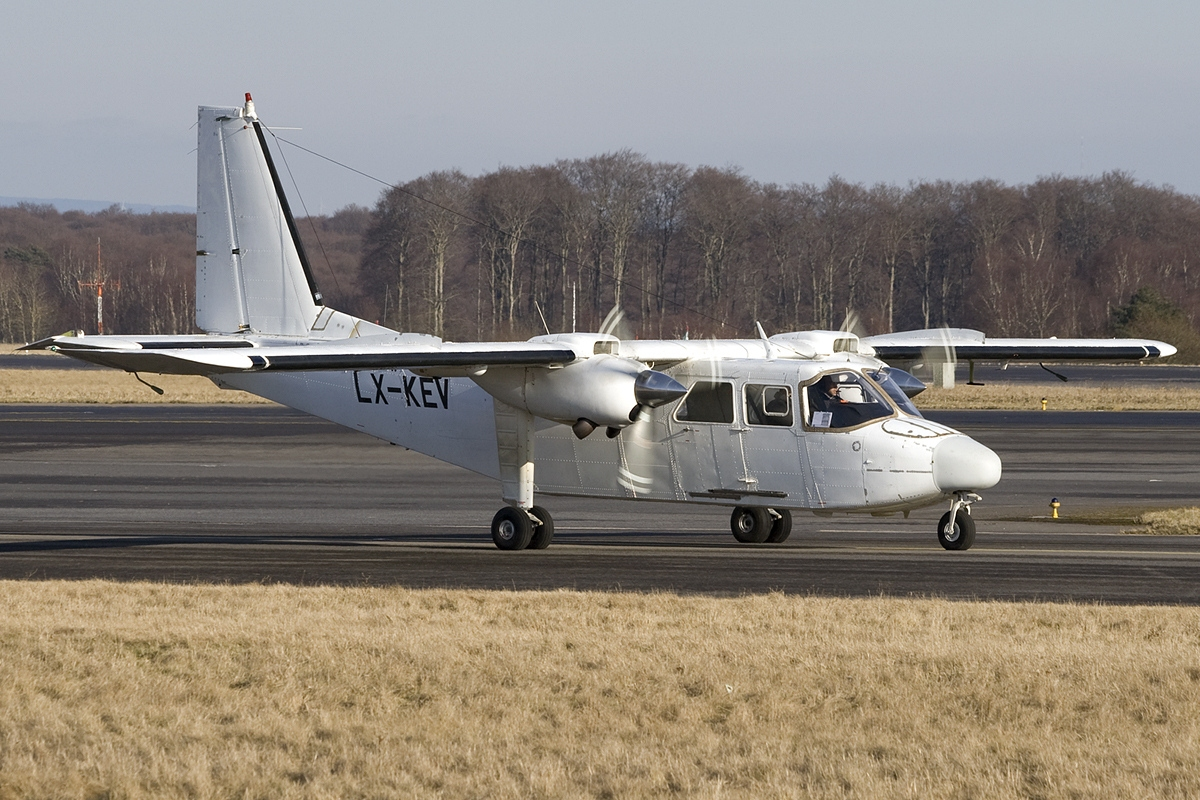
- A Turbine Islander similar to the accident aircraft

Accident
- Date: 13 April 2016
- Summary: Engine failure, improper loading, stall
- Site: Kiunga, Papua New Guinea

Aircraft
- Aircraft type: Britten-Norman BN-2T Turbine Islander
- Operator: Sunbird Aviation
- Registration: P2-SBC
- Flight origin: Tekin Airport, West Sepik, Sandaun Province, Papua New Guinea
- Destination: Kiunga Airport, Kiunga, Western Province, Papua New Guinea
- Occupants: 12
- Passengers: 11
- Crew: 1
- Fatalities: 12
- Survivors: 0

On 13 April 2016, a Britten-Norman BN-2T Turbine Islander operated by Sunbird Aviation crashed about 1,200 m (0.65 nmi; 0.75 mi) short of runway 7 at Kiunga Airport in the Western Province of Papua New Guinea. The plane pitched up right before the crash, then dropped its right wing and fell almost vertically to the ground. Eleven passengers (including three children) and the 31-year-old Australian pilot, Benjamin Picard, were killed. Nine people died on impact, with other three declared dead on arrival at Kiunga Hospital.

The investigation determined that the right engine had failed for unknown reasons at an unverified time, but most likely earlier in the flight. The aircraft was loaded significantly aft of the centre of gravity (CG) limit. Upon extension of the aircraft's flaps, the aft CG caused an uncontrollable pitch up, resulting in the aircraft stalling and spinning into the ground.

== Flight ==
The flight was a non-scheduled domestic chartered passenger flight from Tekin, West Sepik Province (Sandaun) to Kiunga, Western Province. The flight was operated under visual flight rules by Sunbird Aviation, a small non-scheduled aviation company based in Goroka, with a Britten-Norman BN-2T Turbine Islander, registered as P2–SBC. The flight was carrying 11 passengers, including three children, and an Australian pilot, identified as Benjamin Andre Picard.

The flight took off from Kiunga at 13:56 and later reached Oksapmin. Picard then radioed air traffic service (ATS) to report that the flight was entering the left-hand airfield traffic pattern to land at Kiunga. The weather in Kiunga, at the time, was good. Picard then configured the aircraft for landing.

As the flight approached the runway, it suddenly pitched up in a nearly vertical attitude, then rolled to the right. It fell rapidly, struck trees and slammed onto the ground at a nearly 90° angle. Due to the force of the impact, the nose and cockpit were crushed and the tail snapped. Nine people were killed instantly.

Witnesses reported the crash to the airport and subsequently located the crash site. Three people were extricated alive and were transported to Kiunga Hospital, but were pronounced dead on arrival. All 12 passengers and crews on board were killed.

== Investigation ==
Papua New Guinea AIC sent two investigators to the crash site. A representative from the aircraft's manufacturer Britten-Norman was also invited to join the investigation. Initial examination of the wreckage was hampered by bad weather. The wreckage was left unattended for five days due to inundation around the area. It was taken to Kiunga on the sixth day.

The pilot of the flight made several calls to air traffic service (ATS) although he was not heard to make a pan-pan call indicating a mechanical failure; however, some of his transmissions were garbled by interference and "hash". Witnesses reported a change in engine sound as the aircraft rolled over and dove to the ground.

Investigators found that the right engine had failed but were unable to prove exactly when the failure occurred. Damage to the engine suggested that it was still hot and spooling down (turning slowly) on impact, suggesting a very recent shutdown. However, the pilot had set the rudder trim tab in the far nose-left position to compensate for decreased thrust on the right side, and the propeller had automatically feathered; the time required to set the trim and feather the propeller suggests that the engine failed earlier in the flight. Investigators concluded the left engine was functioning when the crash occurred, and that the changing engine sound may have resulted from the changing direction of the left engine exhaust as the aircraft rolled over, rather than to the right engine failing at that time. No malfunction was found that conclusively explained why the right engine failed, but the right fuel tank was found empty, and the position of the engine controls suggested that Picard attempted to cross-feed the right engine from the left fuel tank; however, the controls were distorted by impact forces, making the intended setting hard to discern. All flight control surfaces and trim tabs were found at the crash site, still connected to their respective cockpit controls.

Investigators concluded that an excessively aft centre of gravity (CG) was the primary cause of the crash. It is normal for an aircraft to pitch up when the flaps are extended during the landing approach; however, the aft CG made the aircraft pitch up more severely than usual, and rendered it abnormally difficult for the pilot to compensate using the elevator trim tab. Examination of the wreckage revealed that the flaps were fully extended and that the pilot had applied full nose down elevator trim to no avail. The investigation concluded that safe stall recovery was impossible due to the aircraft's low altitude when the stall occurred.

Investigators found no direct evidence that the pilot had calculated the aircraft CG for the flight, nor for any other recent flights, although he had routinely signed paperwork attesting that he had done so. Additionally, the Weight and Balance Computation Sheet used for calculating the CG was incorrect, as it did not account for major repairs performed to the aircraft after another crash several years prior. The repairs reduced the permissible load in the baggage compartment but the computation sheet was not revised accordingly. The investigation also noted that the emergency locator transmitter (ELT) was past its mandatory replacement date and did not activate as designed when the aircraft crashed. The failed ELT did not hamper rescue efforts, as eyewitnesses easily found the crash site, but the nonfunctional and expired ELT together with the incorrect and incomplete computation sheet led investigators to conclude that the aircraft was not technically airworthy at the time and that Sunbird had violated regulations in operating the flight.

The investigation also recommended that the ATS radio system in the accident vicinity be upgraded to eliminate static interference.

== See also ==
- 2013 Rediske Air DHC-3 Otter crash – another fatal crash of a small charter aircraft attributed to an unrecoverable stall caused by an excessively aft centre of gravity
