= Piper PA-12 Super Cruiser =

1940s American light aircraft

PA-12 Super Cruiser
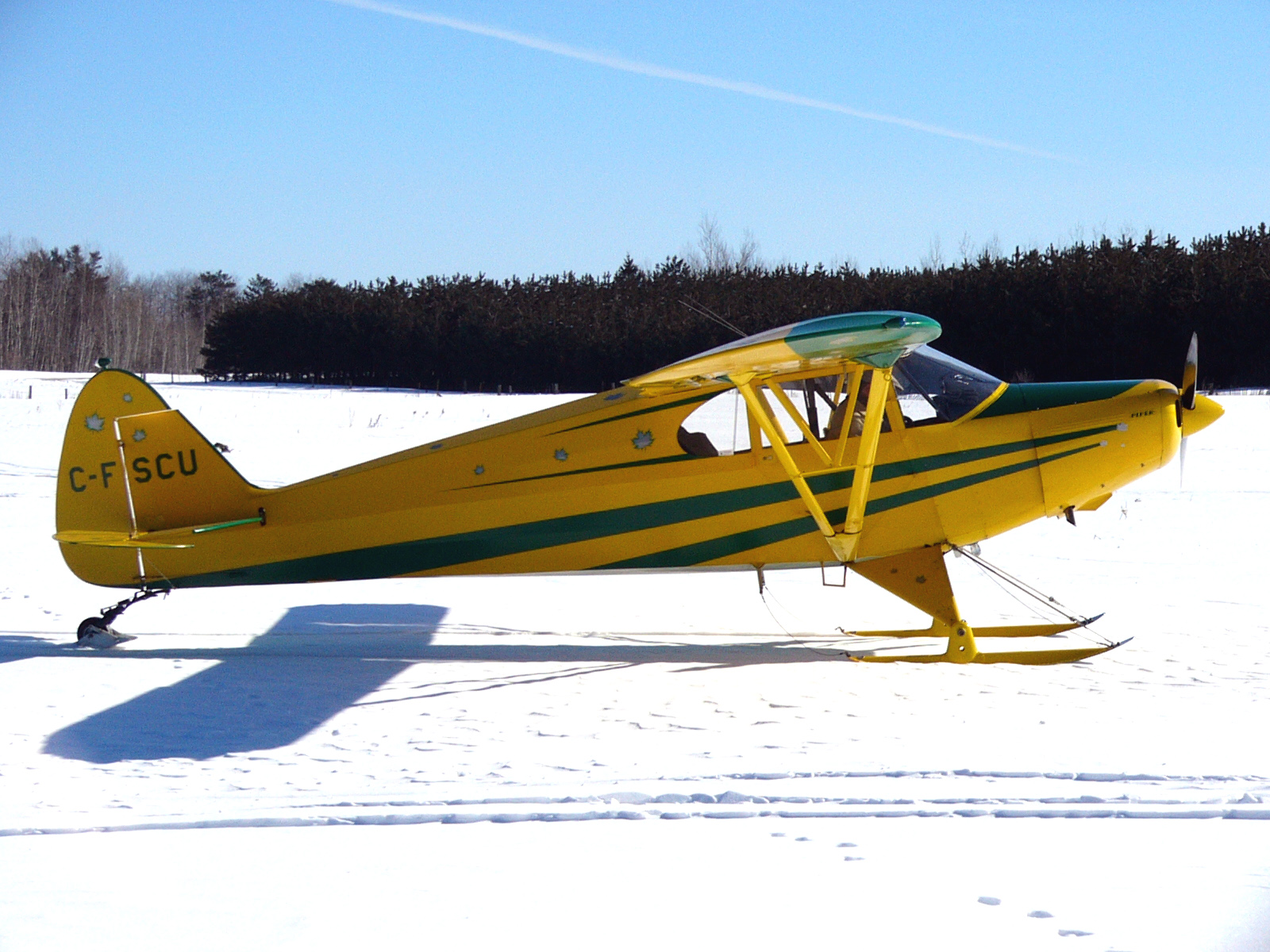
- PA-12 on skis

General information
- Type: Personal use aircraft
- National origin: United States
- Manufacturer: Piper Aircraft
- Status: Production completed
- Primary user: private owners
- Number built: 3,760

History
- Manufactured: 1946-1948
- Introduction date: 1946
- First flight: 29 October 1945
- Developed from: Piper J-5
- Variants: Piper PA-14; Backcountry Super Cubs Supercruiser

The Piper PA-12 Super Cruiser is an American three-seat, high wing, single-engine conventional landing gear-equipped light aircraft that was produced by Piper Aircraft between 1946-48. The PA-12 was an upgraded and redesignated Piper J-5.

== Development ==
When Piper dropped the J- designation system in exchange for the PA- system, the J-5C became the PA-12 "Super Cruiser". The earlier J-5s had been powered by either a 100 hp (75 kW) Lycoming O-235 or a 75 hp (56 kW) Lycoming O-145. The newer PA-12 model was initially powered by a 108 hp (81 kW) Lycoming O-235-C engine, was fully cowled, and had a metal spar wing with two 19 gallon fuel tanks. A Lycoming O-235-C1 engine rated at 115 hp (86 kW) for takeoff was optional.

The prototype NX41561 was converted from a J-5C and first flew from Lock Haven, Pennsylvania, on 29 October 1945. The first production model followed on 22 February 1946 and quantity production continued until the last example of 3760 built was completed on 18 March 1948.

The PA-12 is approved for wheels, skis, floats and also for crop spraying.

Cockpit accommodation is provided for the pilot in the front seat and two passengers in the rear seat, side-by-side. Unlike the J-3 Cub the PA-12 is flown solo from the front seat.

== Operational use ==
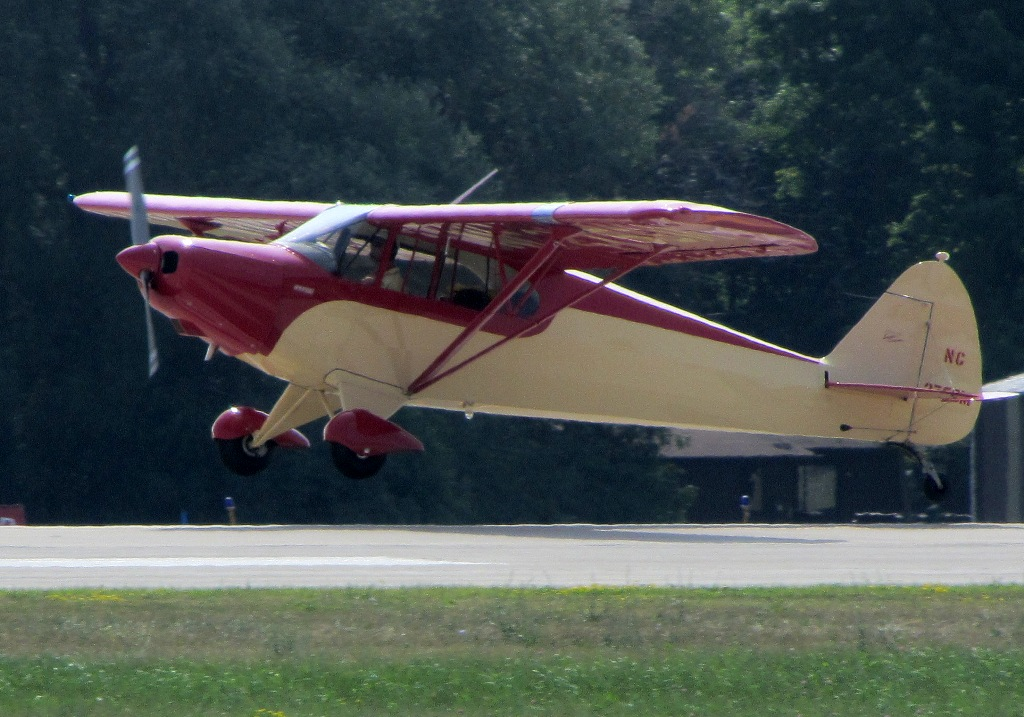
PA-12 landing

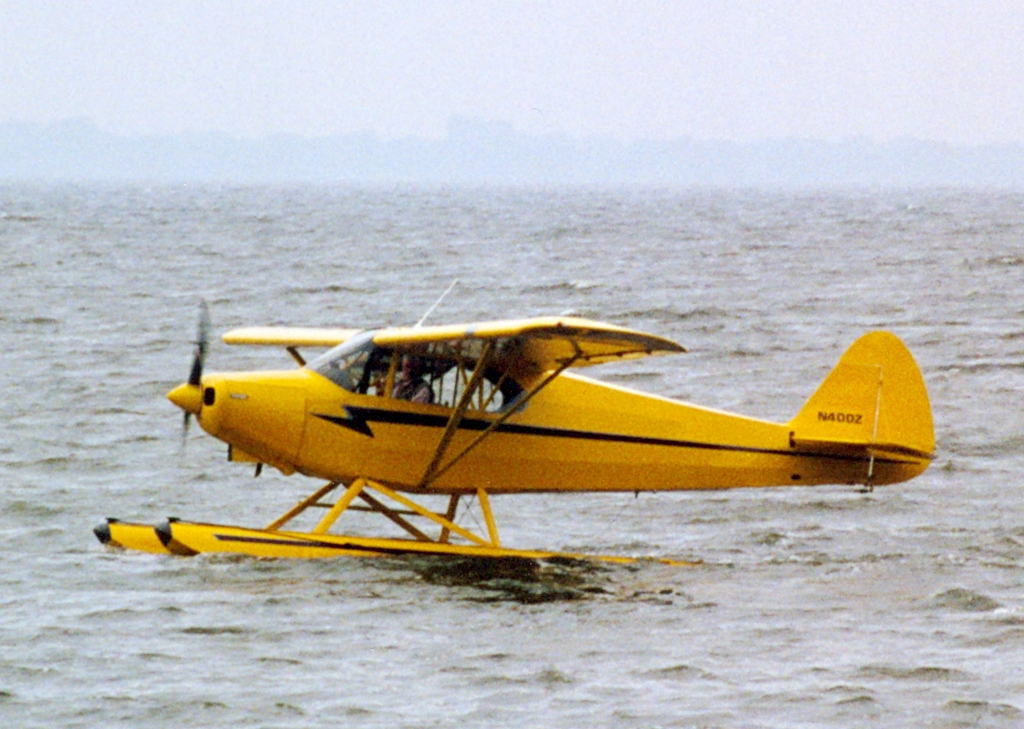
PA-12 on floats

Many PA-12s have been modified with larger engines. Wing flaps and a metal-skin fuselage can be added as modifications.

In 1947, two PA-12s, named City of Washington and City of the Angels, flew around the world. The worst mechanical failure they suffered was a cracked tailwheel. The City of Washington currently resides at the Boeing Aviation Hangar, part of the Steven F. Udvar-Hazy Center in Chantilly, Virginia. The City of the Angels is on display at the Piper Aviation Museum in Lock Haven, Pennsylvania.

PA-12s have been exported to a number of countries including Belgium, Canada, France, Ireland, the Netherlands, Switzerland and the United Kingdom. Many PA-12s are still flown by private pilot owners and the type is commonly seen in North America. In November 2009 there were still 1688 registered in the US and 229 in Canada.

== Variants ==
PA-12
Original model type certified 24 March 1947, with a gross weight of 1,750 lb (794 kg) in the Normal Category and 1,500 lb (680 kg) in the Utility Category
PA-12S
Second model type certified 11 August 1948, with 1,838 lb (834 kg) gross weight, Normal Category only The PA-12S Seaplane variant was fitted with the 135 hp (101 kW) Lycoming O-290-D2 engine to improve take-off performance.

== Notable accidents ==
- 31 July 2020 - A PA-12 piloted by Alaska State Representative Gary Knopp was involved in a mid-air collision with a de Havilland Canada DHC-2 Beaver near Soldotna Airport in the Kenai Peninsula, killing Knopp and all six persons aboard the DHC-2.

== Specifications (PA-12) ==
3-view line drawing of the Piper PA-12 Super Cruiser

Data from Jane's All the World's Aircraft 1948

General characteristics

- Crew: one, pilot
- Capacity: two passengers
- Length: 22 ft 10 in (6.96 m)
- Wingspan: 35 ft 5 1/2 in (10.81 m)
- Height: 6 ft 10 in (2.08 m)
- Wing area: 179.3 sq ft (16.66 m^{2})
- Empty weight: 950 lb (431 kg)
- Gross weight: 1,750 lb (794 kg)
- Max takeoff weight: 1,753 lb (795 kg)
- Fuel capacity: 38 US gal (32 imp gal; 140 L)
- Powerplant: 1 × Lycoming O-235-C 4-cylinder air-cooled horizontally-opposed piston engine, 104 hp (78 kW)
- Propellers: 2-bladed Sensenich fixed-pitch wooden propeller, 6 ft 2 in (1.88 m) diameter

Performance

- Maximum speed: 91 kn (105 mph, 169 km/h) at sea level
- Stall speed: 43 kn (49 mph, 79 km/h) (landing speed)
- Range: 520 nmi (600 mi, 970 km)
- Service ceiling: 18,000 ft (5,500 m) (absolute) at 1,550 lb (700 kg)
- Rate of climb: 510 ft/min (2.6 m/s)
- Wing loading: 9.76 lb/sq ft (47.7 kg/m^{2})
- Take-off Run: 480 ft (150 m) at 1,550 lb (700 kg)
- Landing Roll: 360 ft (110 m) at 1,550 lb (700 kg)

== See also ==
Related development

- Piper J-3 Cub
- Piper J-5

== Bibliography ==
- Bridgman, Leonard (1948). Jane's All the World's Aircraft 1948. London: Sampson Low, Marston & Company, Ltd.
- Peperell, Roger W. and Smith Colin R., Piper Aircraft and their forerunners, 1987, Air-Britain (Historians) Ltd, Tonbridge, Kent, ISBN 0-85130-149-5.
