= Piper J-5 =

Light utility aircraft

J-5 Cub Cruiser
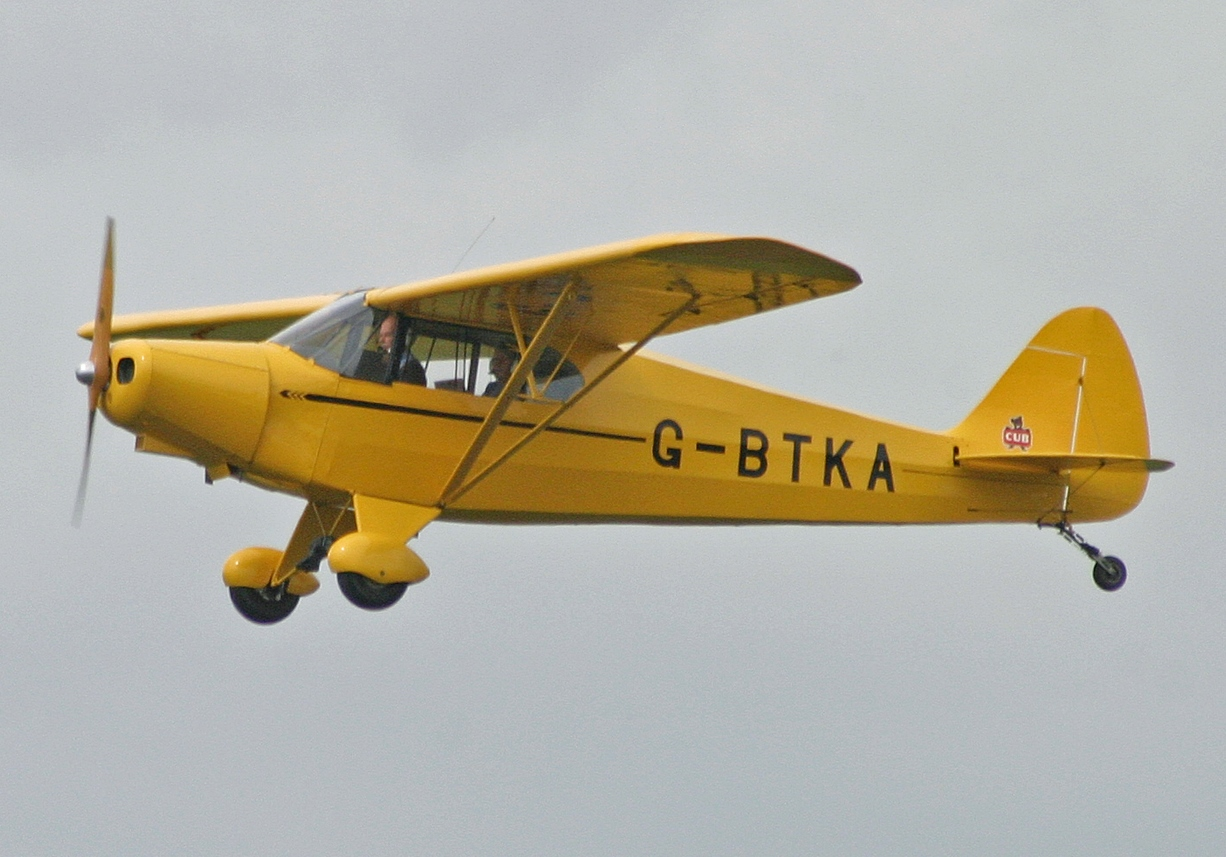
- Piper J-5

General information
- Type: Multipurpose light civil aircraft
- Manufacturer: Piper Aircraft
- Number built: 1,507

History
- Manufactured: 1940-1946
- First flight: July 1939
- Developed from: Piper J-3 Cub
- Variant: Piper PA-12

The Piper J-5 Cub Cruiser was a larger, more powerful version of the basic Piper J-3 Cub. It was designed just two years after the J-3 Cub, and differed by having a wider fuselage with the pilot sitting in the front seat and two passengers sitting in the rear seat. Equipped with a 75-hp Continental engine the plane's cruising speed was 75 mph. Though officially a three-seater, it would be more accurately described as a "two-and-a-half-seater", as two adults would find themselves quite cramped in the wider rear seat. The Cruiser sold for $1,798 when it was first designed.

Production of the three models of the J-5 (-A, -B, -C), fall into two categories that differ considerably. The obvious difference can be seen in the landing gear. Early versions, of which 783 were built between 1940 and early 1942, have external bungees. Those built from 1944 to 1946 included design changes developed for the United States Navy HE-1 flying ambulance, and these models have internal bungees. In August 2018, 327 J-5s remained on the Federal Aviation Administration registry.

== Design and development ==
Throughout World War II, Piper modified the basic structure of the J-5A. The J-5B had a 75 h.p. Lycoming GO-145-C2 engine. The later J-5C also built as the HE-1 (later AE-1) ambulance for the U.S. Navy with rear hinged fuselage decking, used the fully cowled 100 h.p. Lycoming Military O-235-2 or Civilian O-235-B engine with an electrical system, and redesigned landing gear.

After the war, Piper dropped the J- designation system in exchange for the PA- system, and the J-5C became the PA-12 "Super Cruiser". The Super Cruiser was more popular than the basic J-5A, with 3,759 being built.

Piper also produced a four-seat variant of the Super Cruiser with a 115-hp engine. It was designated the PA-14 Family Cruiser. It was the least successful of the three Cruiser designs in terms of aircraft sold, with 238 being built in 1948/49, and only about one hundred remain in existence.

== Variants ==
J-5
75hp Continental A-75-8 powered variant.

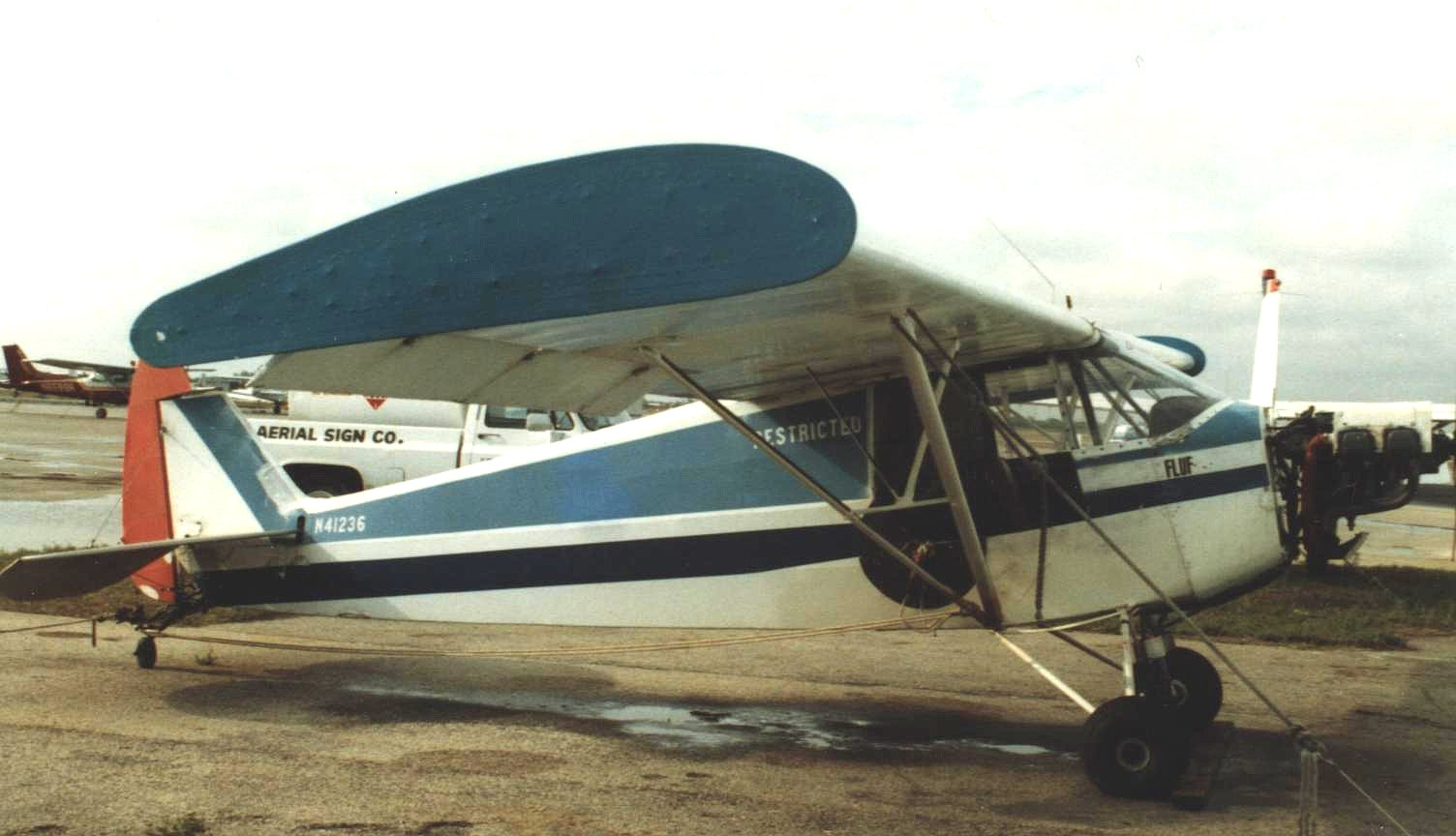
Piper J-5A Cub Cruiser with wing endplates and banner-towing gear at North Perry airport, Florida, in March 1987

J-5A
Continental A-75-9 powered variant.
J-5A-80
J-5As modified with an 80hp Continental A-80-8 engine.
J-5B
75hp Lycoming O-145-B powered variant.
J-5C
100hp Lycoming O-235-B powered variant.
J-5CA
Prototype ambulance variant produced as the HE-1 for the United States Navy.
J-5CO
Prototype observation variant, later modified as the L-4X to be a prototype for the military L-14 version.
J-5D
1946 built aircraft with a 125hp Lycoming engine.

=== Military designations ===
YL-14
Prototype liaison aircraft for the United States Army Air Force, five built.

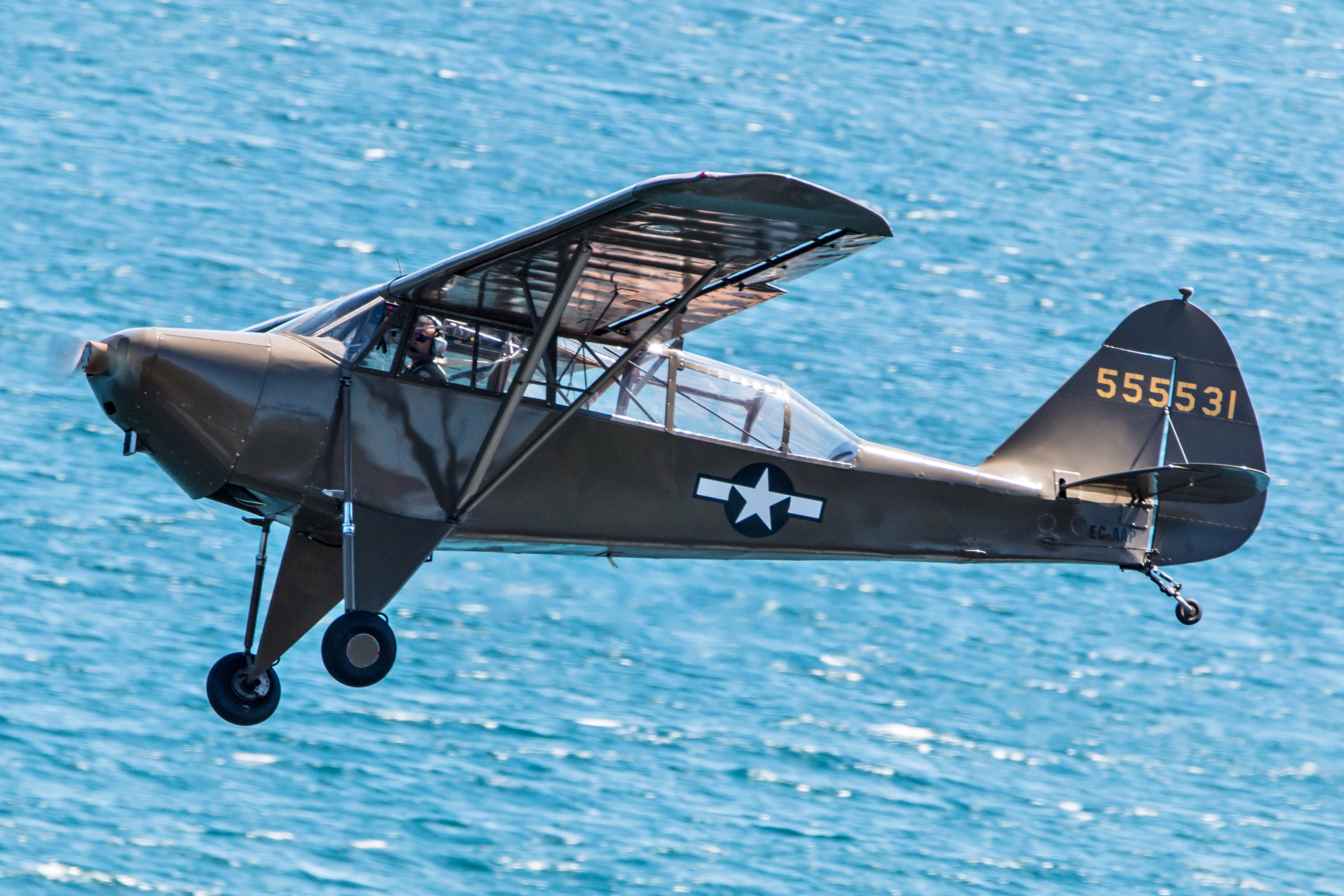
A restored Piper L-14 over the Gijón International Air Festival, 2016

L-14
Production variant of the YL-14, order for 845 cancelled and nine under construction completed for the civilian market.
AE-1
HE-1 redesignated in 1943 in the Ambulance category.
HE-1
Hospital variant for the United States Navy with hinged fuselage top for stretcher access, 100 built later re-designated AE-1.
UC-83
Four J-5A aircraft impressed into military service in Panama later becoming the L-4F.
L-4F
Four UC-83s re-designated and an additional 39 J-5As impressed.
L-4G
J-5B impressed into military service, 34 aircraft.

== Specifications (J-5) ==
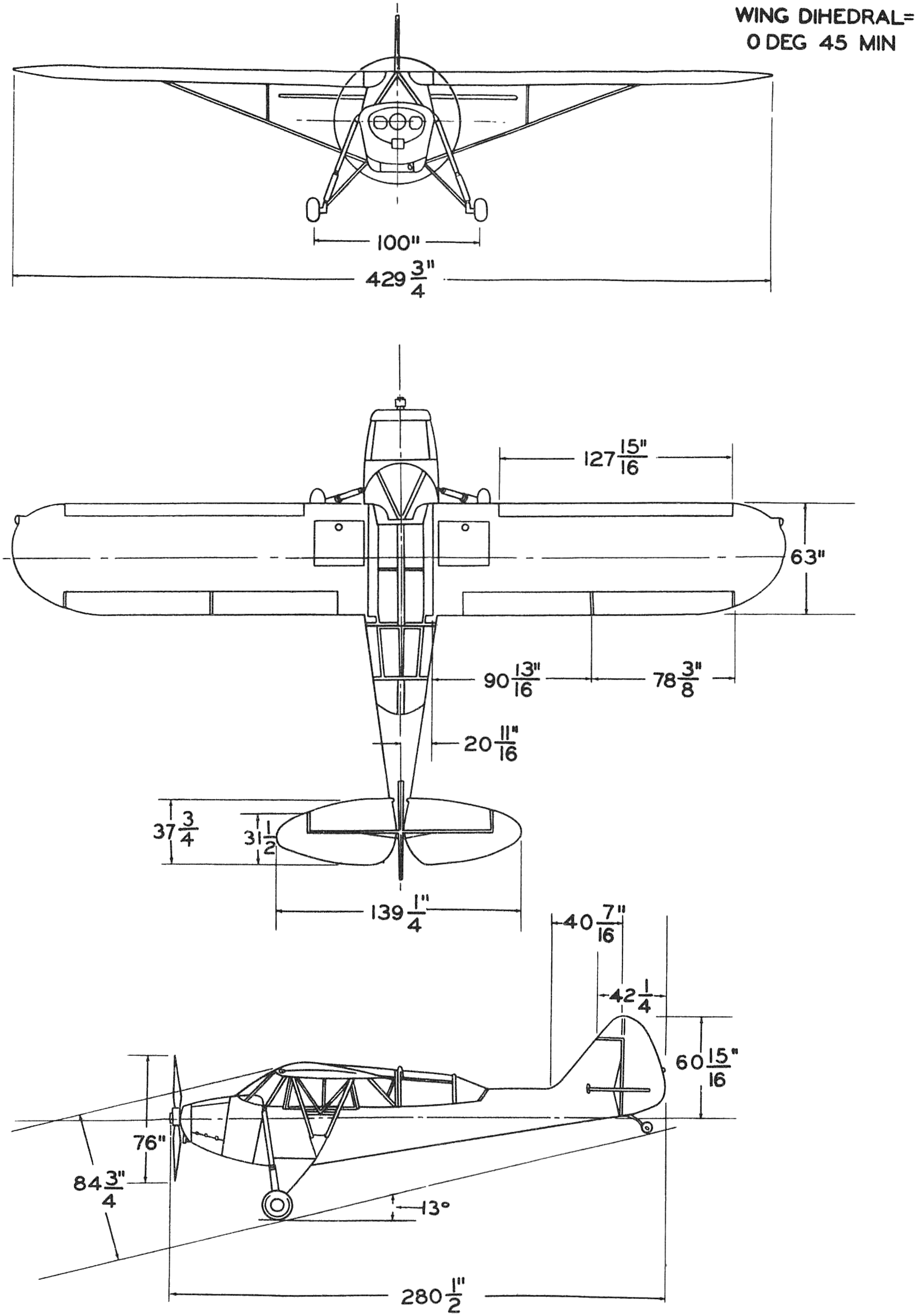
3-view line drawing of the Piper L-14

Data from Peperell, 1987, p. 43

General characteristics

- Crew: one
- Capacity: two passengers
- Length: 22 ft 6 in (6.86 m)
- Wingspan: 35 ft 6 in (10.82 m)
- Height: 6 ft 10 in (2.08 m)
- Empty weight: 830 lb (376 kg)
- Gross weight: 1,450 lb (658 kg)
- Powerplant: 1 × Lycoming GO-145-C2 four cylinder, horizontally-opposed aircraft engine, 75 hp (56 kW)
- Propellers: 2-bladed wooden

Performance

- Maximum speed: 96 mph (154 km/h, 83 kn)
- Cruise speed: 86 mph (138 km/h, 75 kn)
- Stall speed: 42 mph (68 km/h, 36 kn)
- Range: 430 mi (690 km, 370 nmi)
- Service ceiling: 10,200 ft (3,100 m)
- Rate of climb: 460 ft/min (2.3 m/s)

== See also ==
Related development

- Piper J-3 Cub
- Piper PA-12
