= Pacesetter (fishing vessel) =

History

United States
- Name: Pacesetter
- Owner: Dale Lindsay and Matt Pope
- Operator: Pacesetter Mariner Inc.
- Builder: Signal Ship Repair, Mobile, Alabama
- Launched: 1976
- Completed: 1976
- In service: 1976
- Home port: Seattle, Washington
- Identification: IMO number: 7645718
- Fate: Disappeared 27 January 1996
- Notes: Named Priscilla Ann 1976–1979; Coastal Glacier (1979–1988); Pacesetter (1988–1996)

General characteristics
- Class & type: Crab boat
- Tonnage: 193 tons
- Length: 127 ft (39 m)
- Capacity: 114 pots (misinformation)
- Crew: 7
- Notes: Worst accident in the 1996 Alaskan snow crab fishery

F/V Pacesetter was a 127-foot (38.7 m), steel-hulled, Bering Sea crab-fishing boat launched in 1976 as Priscilla Ann. In 1979, she was renamed Coastal Glacier. The vessel eventually was acquired by Matt Pope and Dale Lindsay and renamed Pacesetter. Pacesetter was reported missing in 1996 by the United States Coast Guard Seventeenth District headquartered at Kodiak, Alaska. The search ended with no sign of the boat or her seven-man crew. The loss of Pacesetter was noted as the worst sinking in the Alaskan 1996 snow fishery.

Deadliest Catch star Sig Hansen was once briefly employed as the ship's cook, but never went to sea with her after injuring his ankle.

== As F/V Pacesetter ==
The boat was owned by Pacesetter Mariner, Inc., a family business. Her captain was Matthew Pope. The crew was Stephen Mack, Richard Anderson, Michael Kirk Ericson Sr., Byron Koesterman, Elias Pena, and Stanley Estesad. Pacesetter had a normal "mud boat" stern like other Bender crab boats. The wheelhouse had just been raised and a full maintenance and paint routine was done in the MINI Shipyard and Foss Shipyards the summer before the boat was lost.

== The disappearance ==
On 27 January 1996 at 00:32, Pacesetter was reported missing. United States Coast Guard District 17 at Kodiak, Alaska, picked up an emergency position-indicating radiobeacon station (EPIRB) distress beacon. All U.S. Coast Guard assets were sent out to find the missing crabber. At 06:40, a U.S. Coast Guard Sikorsky HH-60 Jayhawk helicopter sighted an EPIRB beacon. At 7:12, nearby vessels spotted a life raft but no sign of the crew. At 07:47, a second life raft was found partially submerged and not inflated. At 08:06, searchers found a buoy float with the boat's name on it. The U.S. Coast Guard called off the search after two days.

== Investigation ==
A partner boat reported seeing Pacesetter roll from side to side. The U.S. Coast Guard found that the vessel was overloaded with crab pots. Pope had loaded the boat with pots at Dutch Harbor, Alaska, to the boat's supposed maximum. He then left the harbor and picked up an estimated 22 more bait pots on his way to the fishing grounds. Witnesses reported that the boat was rolling so hard that they could see the rolling chalks on the bottom of the boat. From the testimony of crews from other boats and pot yard records, the Coast Guard ruled the vessel was overloaded and traveling in adverse weather conditions when she heeled, rolled over, and sank.

== Similar incidents ==
A number of incidents over the previous decade bore a similarity to the loss of Pacesetter:

- On 19 September 1987 the 127-foot (38.7 m) stern trawler Nordfjord – also built by Signal Ship Repair – disappeared without a trace with the loss of her entire crew of five after sending a brief mayday.
- On 29 January 1989 the 98-foot (29.9 m) crabber Vestfjord sent a mayday about ice accumulation and was lost.
- On 11 February 1991, the 86-foot (26.2 m) Barbarossa vanished with her entire crew of six.
- On 15 January 1995, the Seattle, Washington-based crab boat Northwest Mariner was found capsized. The boat had six crew members. A life raft was found next to the inverted boat with two unconscious crew members on it who then died of hypothermia. The four others were never found.
