= Soldotna Airport =

Public airport in Soldotna, Alaska, United States

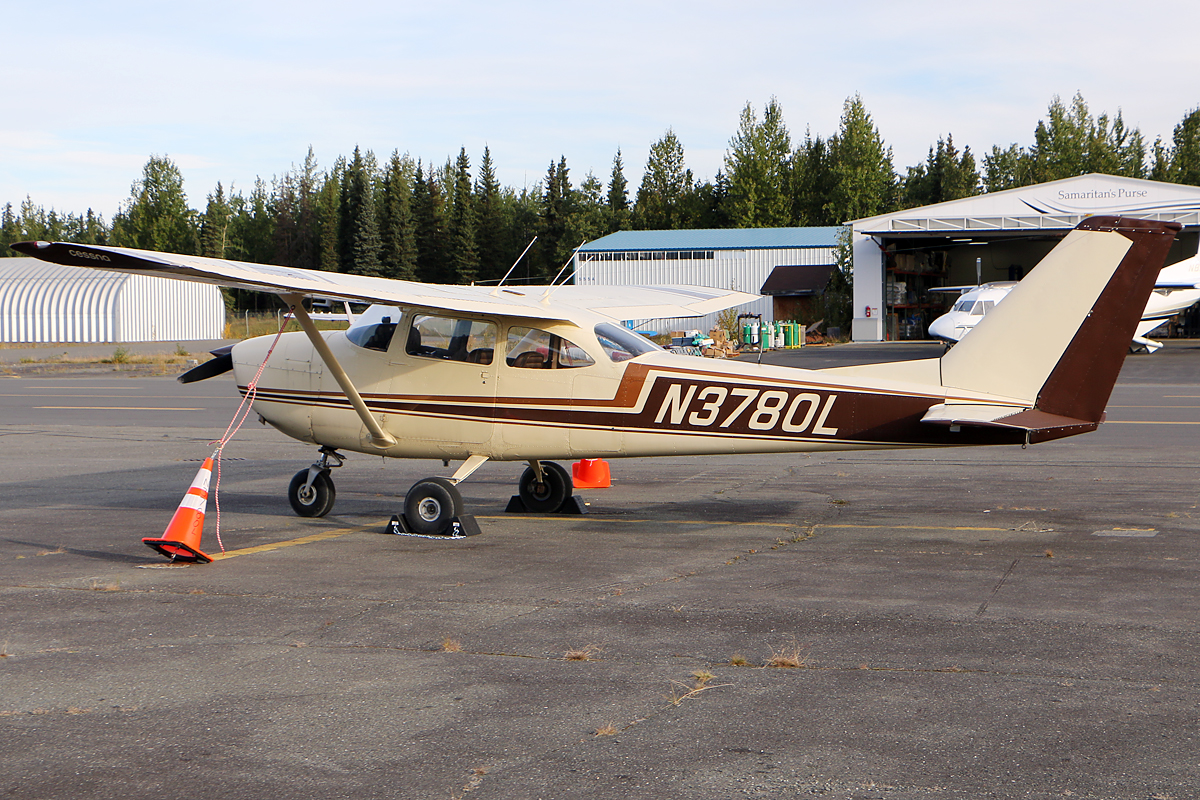
- A Cessna 172 at Soldotna Airport in 2018.
- IATA: SXQ; ICAO: PASX; FAA LID: SXQ

Summary
- Airport type: Public
- Owner: City of Soldotna
- Serves: Soldotna, Alaska
- Elevation AMSL: 113 ft (34 m)
- Coordinates: 60°28′30″N 151°02′18″W

Map
- Location of airport in Alaska

Runways
Direction	Length		Surface
Direction	ft	m	Surface
7/25	5,000	1,524	Asphalt

Statistics (2006)
- Aircraft operations: 15,050
- Based aircraft: 47
- Source: Federal Aviation Administration

Soldotna Airport (IATA: SXQ, ICAO: PASX, FAA LID: SXQ) is a city-owned, public use airport located one nautical mile (1.85 km) southeast of the central business district of Soldotna, Alaska.

== Facilities ==
The airport is located along the south bank of the Kenai River in the southeastern corner of Soldotna city limits, and also adjoins the Kenai National Wildlife Refuge. Road access to the airport is via Funny River Road, a short distance east of its intersection with the Sterling Highway.

The airport covers an area of 426 acres (172 ha) at an elevation of 113 feet (34 m) above mean sea level. It has one runway designated 7/25 with an asphalt surface measuring 5,000 by 132 feet (1,524 x 40 m).

For the 12-month period ending December 31, 2006, the airport had 15,050 aircraft operations, an average of 41 per day: 80% general aviation, 20% air taxi, and <1% military. At that time there were 47 aircraft based at this airport: 92% single-engine, 2% multi-engine and 6% ultralight.

== Airlines and destinations ==
The following airlines offer scheduled passenger service:

Airlines	Destinations
Yute Commuter Service	Anchorage

== Historical airline service ==
During the late 1970s and early 1980s, Alaska Aeronautical Industries (AAI), a commuter air carrier, was operating scheduled passenger service to Anchorage (ANC) with de Havilland Canada DHC-6 Twin Otter turboprop aircraft. North Pacific Airlines (NPA), a commuter air carrier, operated scheduled passenger service to Anchorage during the early and mid-1980s with Beechcraft aircraft. In 1987, South Central Air (SCA), also a commuter air carrier, was operating scheduled passenger service between the airport and Anchorage flying as Western Express on behalf of Western Airlines via a code sharing agreement with Piper Chieftain twin prop aircraft. By 1988, South Central Air was continuing to serve Soldotna on an independent basis with flights to Anchorage, and by 1989 service to Anchorage was being operated by another small commuter air carrier, Inlet Airlines. The airport also served as the hub for Rediske Air, a local air taxi air carrier.

== Aviation accidents and incidents ==
- On February 4, 1985, North Pacific Airlines Flight 1802, a Beechcraft BE65-A-80 Queen Air N50NP, on a regularly scheduled flight from Anchorage to Soldotna, crashed 1.5 miles (2.4 km) southwest of the airport while on approach to land. All nine on board (seven passengers and two flight crew) were killed.
- On July 7, 2013, an air taxi crashed, killing all ten people on board. The single-engine de Havilland Canada DHC-3 Otter, registered to Rediske Air of nearby Nikiski, had a pilot and nine passengers aboard.
- On July 31, 2020, two planes collided mid-air three minutes after taking off from Soldotna, crashing 2 mi (3 km) to the northeast. All seven occupants died: six aboard a DHC-2 Beaver and the pilot and sole occupant of a Piper PA-12, State Representative Gary Knopp.

== See also ==
- List of airports in Alaska
