= 2020 Alaska mid-air collision =

Aviation accident in the United States

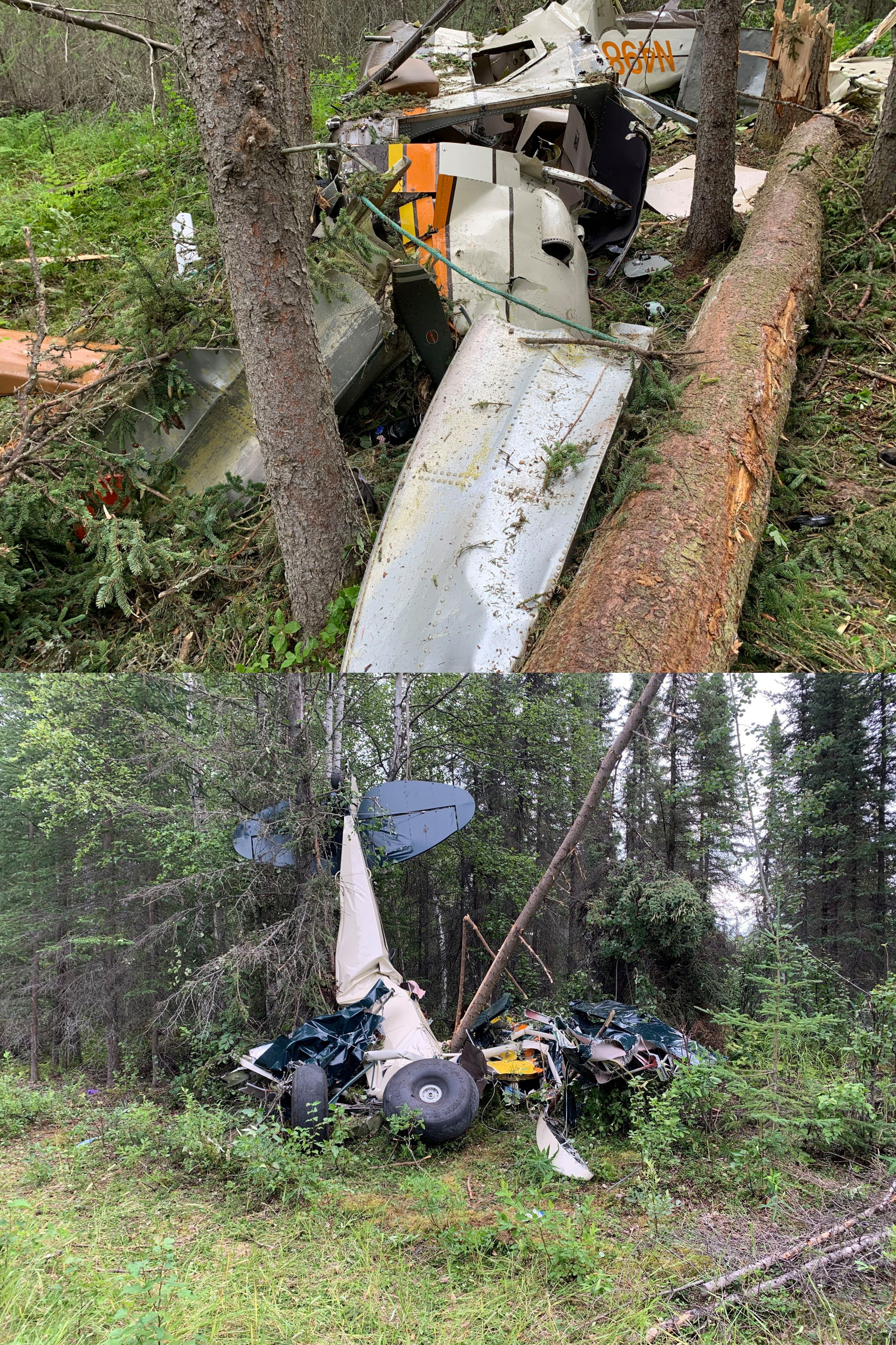
- The wreckage of the DHC-2 (top) and PA-12 (bottom)

Accident
- Date: July 31, 2020
- Summary: Mid-air collision
- Site: Soldotna, Alaska, United States; 60°29′44″N 151°1′1″W
- Total fatalities: 7
- Total survivors: 0

First aircraft
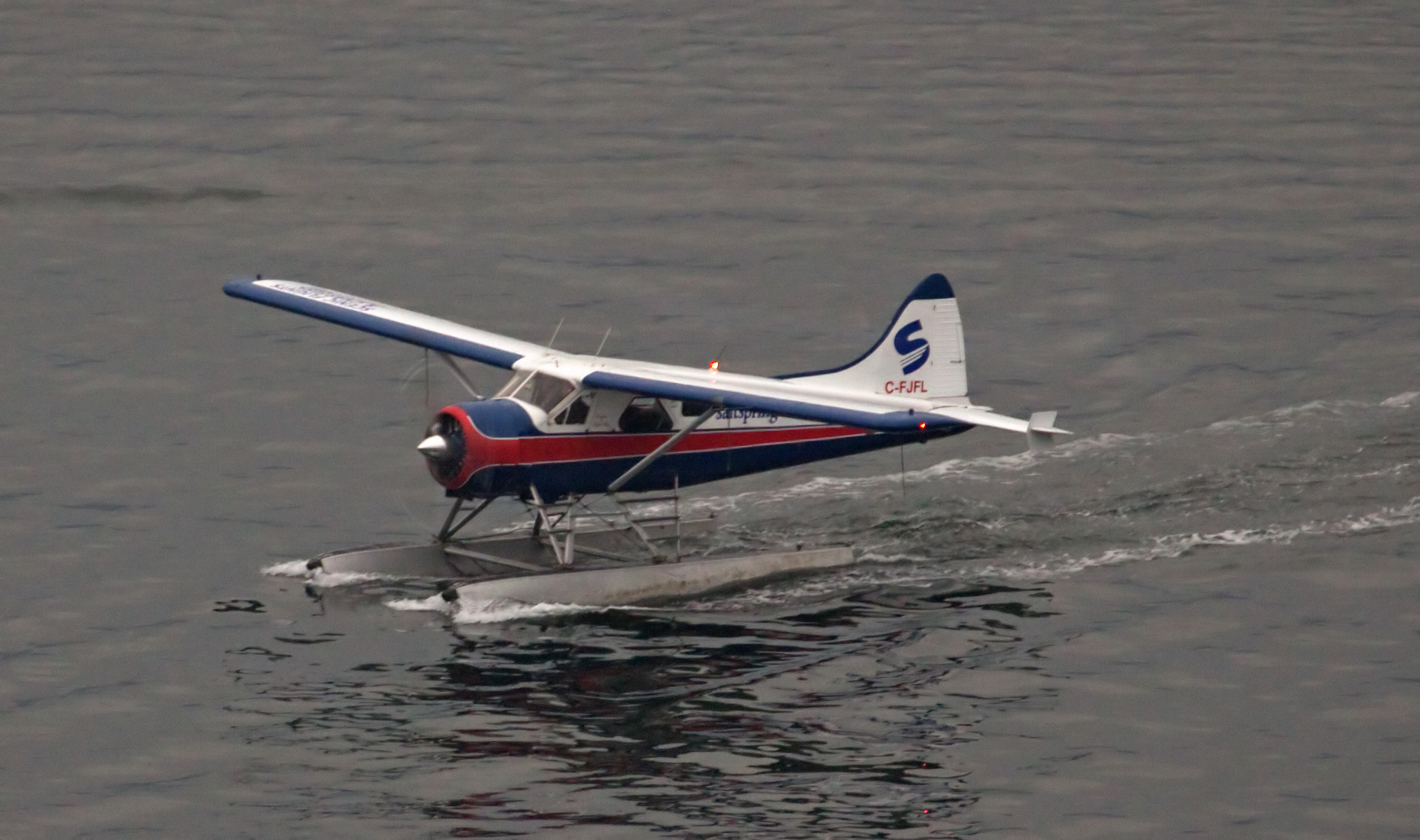
- A de Havilland DHC-2 Beaver also manufactured in 1956, similar to the accident aircraft
- Type: de Havilland Canada DHC-2 Beaver
- Operator: High Adventure Air Charter
- Registration: N4982U
- Flight origin: Longmere Lake
- Destination: Cook Inlet
- Occupants: 6
- Passengers: 5
- Crew: 1
- Fatalities: 6
- Survivors: 0

Second aircraft
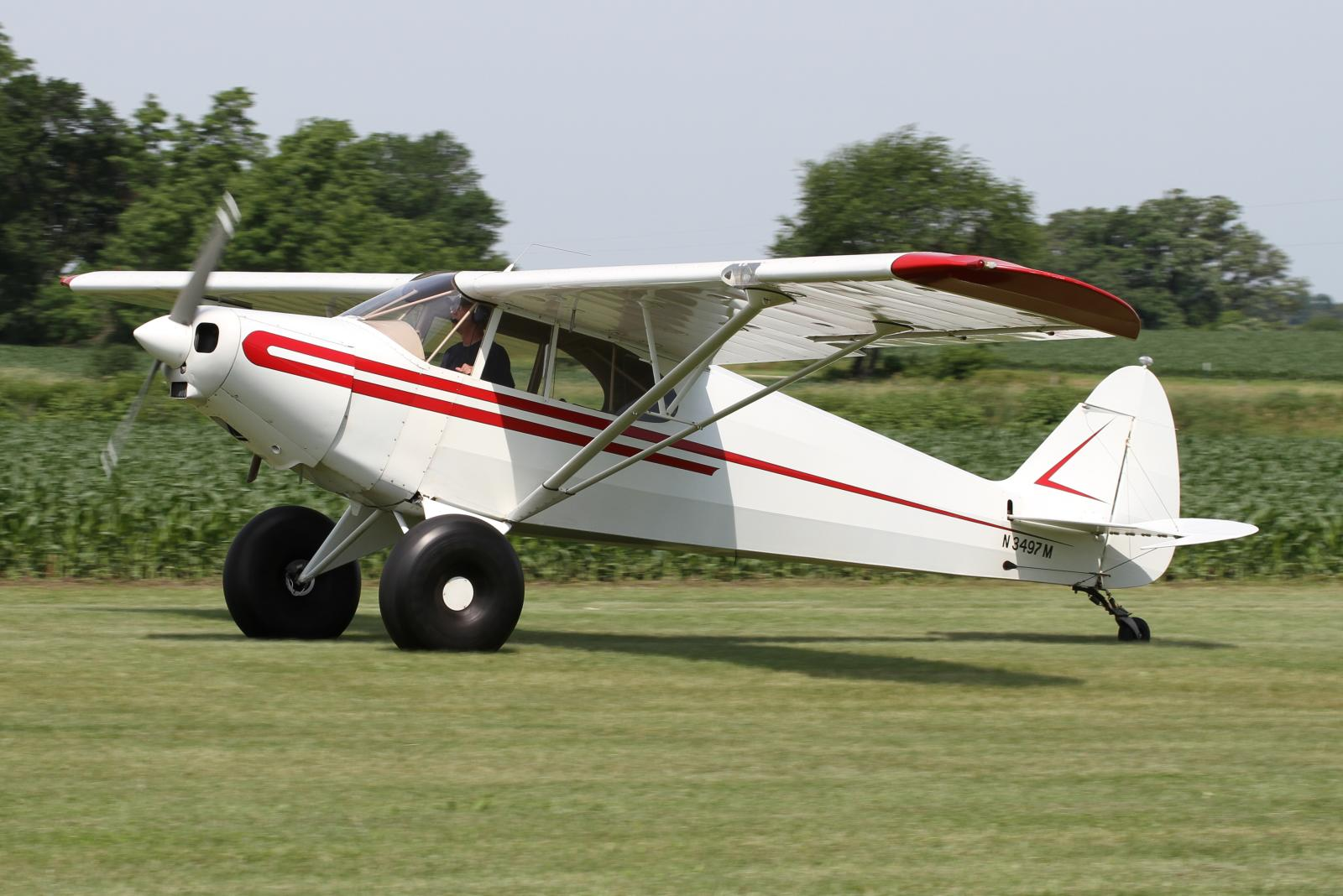
- A Piper PA-12 Super Cruiser similar to the accident aircraft
- Type: Piper PA-12 Super Cruiser
- Registration: N2587M
- Flight origin: Soldotna Airport
- Occupants: 1
- Crew: 1
- Fatalities: 1
- Survivors: 0

On July 31, 2020, a de Havilland DHC-2 Beaver collided with a Piper PA-12 over the Kenai Peninsula, Alaska, approximately 2 mi (3 km) northeast of Soldotna Airport, near mile 91.5 of the Sterling Highway. Most of the wreckage landed about 200 yards from the road. Occupants of both aircraft, including Alaska State Representative Gary Knopp, who was piloting one of them, died from the accident.

== Victims ==
All six occupants of the Beaver were killed as a result of the collision. Five died instantly, while the sixth person succumbed to their injuries during transport to the local hospital.

Gary Knopp, the pilot and sole occupant of the Piper, also died at the crash location. He was elected to the Alaska House of Representatives in 2016 and had been a long-time flight instructor and pilot. In his honor, Gov. Mike Dunleavy ordered US and Alaska state flags to be flown at half-staff for three days.

== Aircraft and accident ==
The Beaver, manufactured in 1956 and operated by High Adventure Air Charter on lease from Soldotna Aircraft & Equipment Leasing LLC, was traveling from Longmere Lake to Cook Inlet for a fishing trip.

The Piper, manufactured in 1946, was privately owned by Knopp and departed from Soldotna Airport en route to Fairbanks. Knopp had been denied a medical certification in June 2012 for vision problems; after an appeal, the denial was upheld in July. In addition, although the Piper was registered to Knopp as N2587M, it had the aircraft registration number N1904T painted on the plane's exterior. N1904T had been reserved by Knopp but was not valid, causing the aircraft to be misidentified initially as a Piper Aztec.

National Weather Service (NWS) reports from the Soldotna airport for Friday morning showed clear visibility, with broken clouds at 10,000 and 4,500 feet (3,000 and 1,400 m).

== Investigation ==
The National Transportation Safety Board (NTSB) investigated the crash.

A preliminary report was issued in August 2020. The two aircraft had taken off at the same time (8:24 a.m. ADT) from separate locations and collided three minutes later, at an altitude of approximately 1,175 feet (358 m). A witness stated he saw the Piper, traveling north, strike the rear fuselage of the DHC-2, traveling west; after the impact, he saw what he thought was the DHC-2's left wing separate from the aircraft, which entered an uncontrolled spin before crashing to the ground. Paint transfer from the Piper was found on the rear fuselage of the DHC-2.

=== Final report ===
In the final report the probable cause was determined to be "[t]he failure of both pilots to see and avoid the other airplane." The report states that based on a visibility study both pilots could have seen the other airplane in the minute leading up to the collision, but also notes that the conditions on the incident date would have made this more challenging, and that Knopp would have needed to look almost directly at the sun to see the DHC-2.

It noted that the absence of airborne traffic advisory systems (not required at the time of the incident), as well as Knopp's "decision to fly with a known severe vision deficiency" both were contributory factors. The NTSB also recommended the FAA implement a requirement that pilots report their positions on designated common traffic advisory frequencies (CTAF) and create additional dedicated CTAF areas in locations with a high risk for midair collisions.

The report further noted that the operation of passenger-carrying flights without ADS-B does not meet the "appropriate level of safety" and therefore recommended to the FAA that ADS-B in-and-out TCAS systems be required in Charter or other flights flying under 14 CFR Part 135 regulations.

== See also ==
- 2019 George Inlet mid-air collision
- 2023 Denali Borough mid-air collision
