= Air traffic service =

Service regulating aircraft

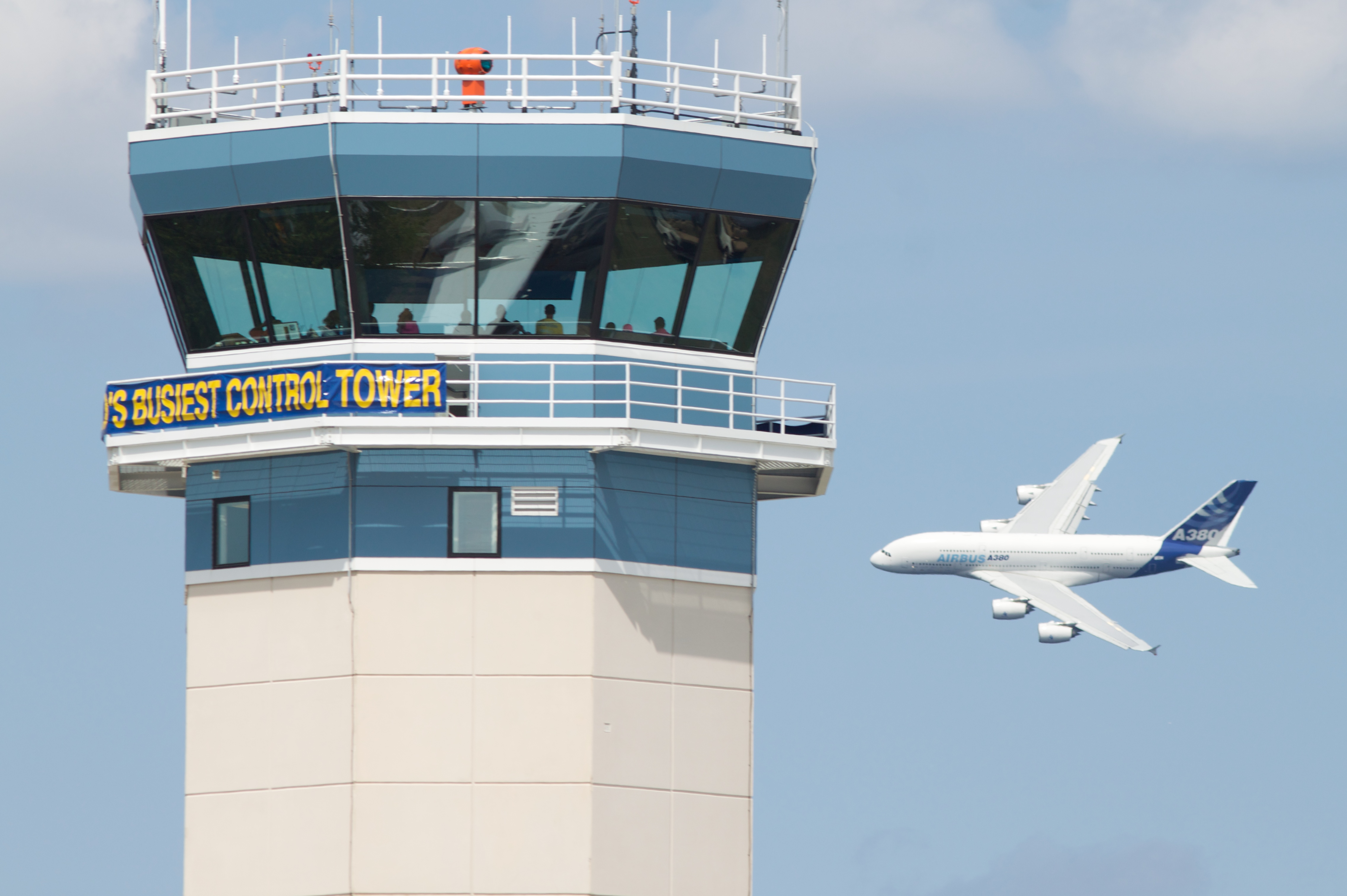
An Airbus A380 approaching the new air traffic control tower at Wittman Regional Airport in Oshkosh, Wisconsin during EAA AirVenture Oshkosh in 2009. The banner on the side of the tower reads "[World]'s Busiest Control Tower" in reference to the large number of aircraft movements during the airshow.

In aviation, an air traffic service (ATS) is a service which regulates and assists aircraft in real-time to ensure their safe operations. In particular, ATS is to:

- prevent collisions between aircraft; provide advice of the safe and efficient conduct of flights;
- conduct and maintain an orderly flow of air traffic;
- notify concerned organizations of and assist in search and rescue operations.

The ATS further provides four services:

- air traffic control services, which is to prevent collisions in controlled airspace by instructing pilots where to fly;
- air traffic advisory service, used in uncontrolled airspace to prevent collisions by advising pilots of other aircraft or hazards;
- flight information service, which provides information useful for the safe and efficient conduct of flights;
- alerting service, which provides services to all known aircraft.

An ATS route is a designated route for channeling the flow of traffic as necessary for the provision of air traffic services. This includes jet routes, area navigation routes (RNAV), and arrival and departure routes. Routes may be defined with a designator; a path to and from significant points; distance between significant points; reporting requirements; and the lowest safe altitude.

== List of service providers ==
=== Europe ===
Recently European ATS service providers are facing a greater change on the European market, with the introduction of the Single European Sky, that divides Europe into "functional airspace blocks" – replacing the old, national airspace blocks.
