= Cape Newenham =

Cape Newenham is a geographical feature of the pacific coast of Alaska providing a namesake for:

- Cape Newenham Long Range Radar Site, a United States Air Force RADAR station operated during the cold war
- Cape Newenham LRRS Airport, a military airstrip in Alaska
- SS Cape Newenham (MC-502), a troop ship operated during World War II
