= 2013 Rediske Air DHC-3 crash =

Air taxi crash at Soldotna Airport, Alaska

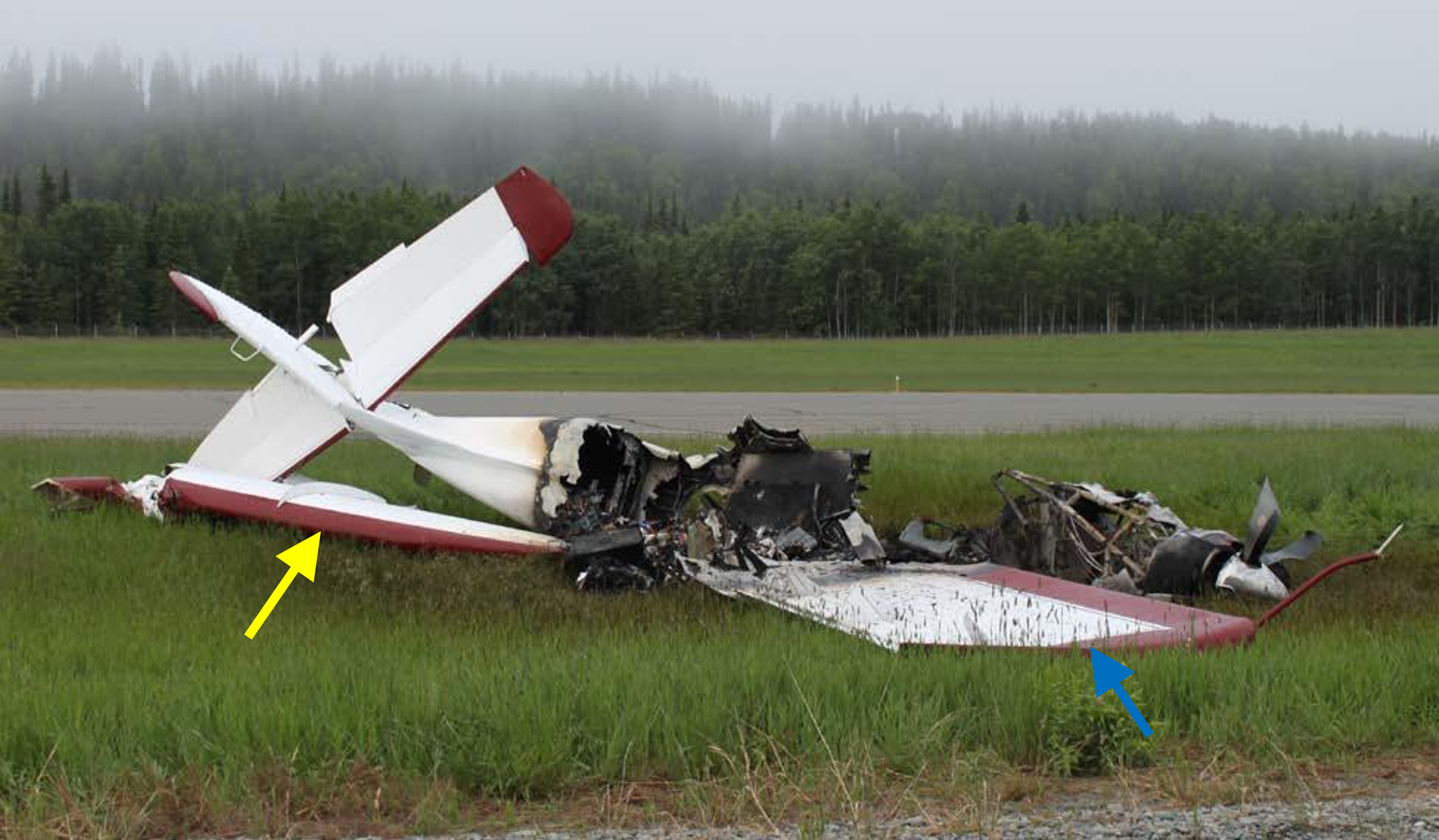
- Wreckage of the aircraft

Accident
- Date: 7 July 2013
- Summary: Stall and crash caused by improper loading
- Site: Soldotna Airport, Soldotna, Alaska, U.S.

Aircraft
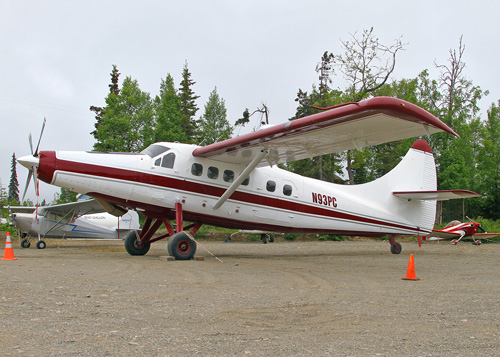
- N93PC, the aircraft involved in the crash, in 2011
- Aircraft type: de Havilland Canada DHC-3 Otter
- Operator: Rediske Air
- Registration: N93PC
- Flight origin: Soldotna Airport
- Destination: Bear Mountain Lodge, Chinitna Bay, Nikiski, Alaska
- Occupants: 10
- Passengers: 9
- Crew: 1
- Fatalities: 10
- Survivors: 0

On 7 July 2013, a single-engine de Havilland Canada DHC-3 Otter, operated by air charter company Rediske Air, crashed on take-off at Soldotna Airport, Alaska. The sole crewmember and all nine passengers on board were killed. The crash was attributed to improper loading.

== Background ==
=== Airline ===
Rediske Air was a small air taxi charter airline operating out of Alaska. Rediske Air was formed in 1991. It was started by Charlie Rediske, a local pilot. In 2001, Charlie Rediske died, and his son Walter and his daughter Lyla became chief operators of the airline. As of 2017, the airline's website was no longer working.

=== Aircraft ===
The aircraft involved was a de Havilland Canada DHC-3 Otter with serial number 280 which was originally delivered to the Royal Canadian Mounted Police Air Division on 25 February 1959 with Canadian registration C-FMPX. From 1979 to 2010 it operated commercially for various companies across Canada. The aircraft was fitted with supplemental type certificate (STC) kits to add an enlarged baggage compartment, a strengthened cargo net, and shoulder harnesses. In 2010, it was sent to Recon Air Corporation in Geraldton, Ontario, and fitted with a Garrett TPE-33-10R turboprop engine under a Texas Turbine Conversions, Inc. STC, along with three other STCs: a Baron short takeoff and landing (STOL) kit; a pulse light control system; and extended-range fuel tanks. Later that same year, the aircraft was sold and re-registered in the United States as N93PC.

== Crash ==
At the time of the accident, the aircraft was being operated by Rediske Air of Nikiski, Alaska, on a commercial charter flight to Bear Mountain Lodge, about 90 mi (140 km) southwest of Soldotna. According to the United States' Federal Aviation Administration (FAA) and local law enforcement officials, the aircraft "struck the runway and burned" shortly after takeoff from Soldotna Airport, before 11:20 a.m. AKDT (19:20 UTC), killing all 10 people on board. The National Transportation Safety Board (NTSB) was called in to investigate the cause of the crash.

In addition to the pilot, the crash killed nine people from two families visiting Alaska from Greenville, South Carolina. The victims' ages ranged from 11 to 74. The aircraft impacted the ground 2,320 ft (710 m) from the threshold of the departure runway, about 154 ft (47 m) to the right of the extended runway centerline, in a nose-low, right-wing-low attitude. An intense post-crash fire consumed most of the aircraft's cockpit and cabin, destroying an unknown quantity of cargo and baggage.

The weather was reported to be cloudy at the time of the accident.

== Investigation ==
There were no eyewitnesses to the accident. The incident aircraft was not equipped with a flight data recorder. The NTSB found that a passenger had recorded the takeoff with the camera of his mobile phone. Due to the absence of any other recorded data, the NTSB decided to reconstruct the trajectory and speed of the airplane based on the recorded video. The analysis was challenging, since the camera was hand-held. By applying image analysis and 3D computer simulation, the NTSB was able to first estimate the time-varying orientation of the camera and then the location and orientation of the airplane. The NTSB report found: "The analysis revealed that shortly after takeoff, flight speed started decreasing rapidly and angle of attack started increasing rapidly. Approximately 11 seconds after takeoff, flight speed and angle of attack reached levels corresponding to stall." The video showed that the aircraft had taken off with its flaps in the full-down or landing position, contrary to the recommendation in the aircraft's flight manual.

The aircraft's engine and flight controls were recovered from the scene of the crash; they did not show signs of mechanical problems nor any damage attributable to causes other than the crash itself. The nature of the propeller and engine damage was consistent with an engine that was rotating and producing power on impact.

Before flying from Nikiski to Soldotna to pick up the passengers, the aircraft had been loaded with what the operator estimated to be 300 lb (140 kg) of food and other supplies for the stay at the fishing lodge, along with 80 lb (36 kg) of baggage. However, no attempt was made to weigh the supplies, nor to calculate the aircraft's center of gravity (CG). Although much of the supplies and baggage was destroyed in the post-crash fire, the NTSB was able to determine the contents based on the manifest, and it found that the supplies actually weighed approximately 720 lb (330 kg), about 2.4 times what the operator estimated. The operator did not keep detailed fueling records, but a witness saw the pilot fill the forward fuel tank and begin filling the center tank before the flight. Although the cargo was far heavier than estimated and the forward and center fuel tanks were either full or mostly full, the aircraft carried no passengers during its initial positioning flight, and the NTSB concluded that its gross weight and CG had been within acceptable limits at this point; this flight was accordingly uneventful.

The NTSB evaluated several scenarios for the aircraft's estimated takeoff weight from Soldotna, based on the probable amount of fuel left in the tanks after the flight from Nikiski, the weight of the pilot, the reported and autopsied post-crash weights of the passengers, the reported weight of additional baggage loaded at Soldotna, and the weight of baggage recovered after the crash. Although the location of the cargo and baggage within the aircraft could not be precisely determined due to damage, the NTSB concluded that the aircraft was approximately 21 lb (9.5 kg) overweight on takeoff, with its CG at least 5.5 in (14 cm) aft of the limit in the aircraft's type certificate. Based on the kinematic study conducted using the video evidence, the CG may have been a full 9 in (23 cm) aft of the limit. The NTSB concluded that this condition would have caused the aircraft to pitch up on takeoff and enter an unrecoverable stall even if the pilot immediately applied full nose-down elevator. This was exacerbated by taking off with the flaps fully extended, but the NTSB concluded that the "CG was so far aft of the limit that the airplane likely would have stalled even with the flaps in the correct position."

The NTSB attributed the accident to "The operator's failure to determine the actual cargo weight, leading to the loading and operation of the airplane outside of the weight and center of gravity limits contained in the airplane flight manual, which resulted in an aerodynamic stall." A contributing factor was the operator's failure to require weight and balance documentation for each flight in accordance with FAA regulations.

== See also ==
- 2016 Sunbird Aviation crash – another fatal crash of a small charter aircraft attributed to an unrecoverable stall caused by an excessively aft center of gravity
