= List of shipwrecks in 1925 =

The list of shipwrecks in 1925 includes ships sunk, foundered, grounded, or otherwise lost during 1925.

table of contents
1925
Jan	Feb	Mar	Apr
May	Jun	Jul	Aug
Sep	Oct	Nov	Dec
Unknown date

== January ==
=== 2 January ===
List of shipwrecks: 2 January 1925
Ship	State	Description
Heinrich Hugo Stinnes 7	Germany	The cargo ship sprang a leak off Kopervik, Norway and was beached in Høyevarde Bay.
Katharina Dorothea Fritzen	Germany	The cargo ship was driven ashore at Skudesneshavn, Norway and was wrecked. Her crew were rescued.
Mohawk	United States	The passenger ship caught fire and sank in Delaware Bay. Two hundred and seventy passengers were rescued by USCGC Kickapoo ( United States Coast Guard) and an American tug.

=== 3 January ===
List of shipwrecks: 3 January 1925
Ship	State	Description
Turnu Severin	Romania	The cargo ship came ashore near Cap Gris Nez, Pas-de-Calais, France. She broke in two on 12 January and was declared a total loss. She was refloated on 23 March and beached at Boulogne.

=== 4 January ===
List of shipwrecks: 4 January 1925
Ship	State	Description
Castlerock	United Kingdom	The cargo ship struck a breakwater at Fishguard, Pembrokeshire and was consequently beached at Goodwick Sands. She was refloated on 12 January.
Emmanuel	Greece	The cargo ship was driven ashore at St David's, Pembrokeshire and was wrecked. All 25 crew were rescued. She was refloated on 24 March.

=== 6 January ===
List of shipwrecks: 6 January 1925
Ship	State	Description
Kiang Wo	United Kingdom	The cargo ship ran aground in the Yangtze 70 nautical miles (130 km) upstream of Hankow, China. She was refloated on 12 January.
Taiyu Maru	Japan	The cargo ship collided with Yetorofu Maru (Japan) in the Straits of Shimonoseki and sank.

=== 8 January ===
List of shipwrecks: 8 January 1925
Ship	State	Description
Mercurius	Netherlands	The cargo ship ran aground on Pearl Rock, Gibraltar. Her crew were rescued. She broke in two on 11 January and was a total loss.
Riding	United Kingdom	The cargo ship ran aground on the south coast of Iceland. She was a total loss.

=== 10 January ===
List of shipwrecks: 10 January 1925
Ship	State	Description
Manuel Caragol	Uruguay	The sailing ship was abandoned in the Atlantic Ocean (48°05′N 67°40′W). She was set afire by her crew, who were rescued by Kenowis (United States).
Nystrand	Norway	The cargo ship ran aground on Lillegrunden, Great Belt. She was refloated on 16 January.

=== 12 January ===
List of shipwrecks: 12 January 1925
Ship	State	Description
Ceramic	United Kingdom	The ocean liner ran aground in the River Clyde at Glasgow. She was later refloated and drydocked.
Elli	United Kingdom	The cargo ship foundered in the Aegean Sea 20 nautical miles (37 km) off Astypalaia, Greece.

=== 13 January ===
List of shipwrecks: 13 January 1925
Ship	State	Description
USS S-19	United States Navy	S-19 aground at Chatham, Massachusetts The S-class submarine ran aground off Chatham, Massachusetts. She was later refloated and returned to service.

=== 14 January ===
List of shipwrecks: 14 January 1925
Ship	State	Description
Aladdin	Norway	The cargo ship sank off Silda, Norway.
Bidsie and Bell	United Kingdom	The schooner ran aground at Holyhead, Anglesey. Her crew were rescued.
Camborne	United Kingdom	The auxiliary schooner was driven ashore at Arthurstown, County Wexford, Ireland. She was refloated on 27 January.
Cardiff Hall	United Kingdom	The cargo ship was driven ashore at Seven Heads, County Cork, Ireland and was wrecked with the loss of all hands.

=== 18 January ===
List of shipwrecks: 18 January 1925
Ship	State	Description
Arnold	Sweden	The cargo ship ran aground on Soay, Skye, United Kingdom. She broke in two and was a total loss.
Raita	France	The sailing ship was wrecked at Carmannah whilst on a voyage from Port Gamble, Washington, United States to Papeete, Tahiti. All ten crew were rescued.

=== 19 January ===
List of shipwrecks: 19 January 1925
Ship	State	Description
Goodig	United Kingdom	The cargo ship ran aground at Vlissingen, Netherlands. She was refloated on 22 January.
Terrier	United Kingdom	The three-masted schooner came ashore at St. Ann's Head, Pembrokeshire and was wrecked. Her crew were rescued.

=== 20 January ===
List of shipwrecks: 20 January 1925
Ship	State	Description
Archangel	United Kingdom	The passenger ferry ran aground at Hook of Holland, Netherlands. Passengers were landed by three tugs.
HMS Monarch	Royal Navy	Washington Naval Treaty: The Orion-class battleship was sunk as a target in the Atlantic Ocean off the Isles of Scilly by HMS Carysfort, HMS Caledon, HMS Curacoa, HMS Calliope, HMS Hood, HMS Repulse, HMS Ramillies, HMS Revenge, HMS Resolution, HMS Royal Oak, HMS Royal Sovereign and HMS Vectis (all Royal Navy).
Redline No.1	United Kingdom	The coastal tanker foundered in the Bristol Channel with the loss of eight of her nine crew. The survivor was rescued by Thérese (France).

=== 21 January ===
List of shipwrecks: 21 January 1925
Ship	State	Description
Europe	France	The cargo liner came ashore at Pirio Press, Cotonou, French Dahomey. Her passengers were taken off by Scheldestroom (Netherlands). She was refloated on 25 January.

=== 23 January ===
List of shipwrecks: 23 January 1925
Ship	State	Description
Mars	France	The cargo ship struck rocks off the Jardin Lighthouse, Ille-et-Vilaine and was beached at Dinard. She was later refloated and taken to Saint-Malo.
Waldtrout Horn	Germany	The cargo ship foundered in the Atlantic Ocean (48°33′N 24°25′W) in a gale. Her crew had been taken off the day before by Silverway (United Kingdom).

=== 24 January ===
List of shipwrecks: 24 January 1925
Ship	State	Description
HMML 307	Royal Navy	The Motor Launch suffered an engine explosion and sank at Hankow, China.

=== 25 January ===
List of shipwrecks: 25 January 1925
Ship	State	Description
George Jr.	United States	During a voyage from Petersburg to Juneau, Territory of Alaska, the 27-gross register ton motor vessel sank in a snowstorm with high seas and strong winds in the Alexander Archipelago in Southeast Alaska between Taku Harbor and Gastineau Channel. All four men on board – three crewmen and a passenger – perished.
Speedway	United States	The auxiliary schooner caught fire in the Pacific Ocean off the Swiftsure Reef, British Columbia, Canada and was abandoned.

=== 26 January ===
List of shipwrecks: 26 January 1925
Ship	State	Description
Olive Branch	United Kingdom	The schooner struck a submerged object in the Bristol Channel and sprang a leak. An attempt was made to reach Milford Haven, Pembrokeshire but she foundered off Dale Point.

=== 28 January ===
List of shipwrecks: 28 January 1925
Ship	State	Description
Benvannoch	United Kingdom	The cargo ship ran aground in the Singapore Strait at Pulo Angup whilst on a voyage from Port Said, Egypt to Hakodate, Japan. She was refloated on 2 February.
Doon Glen	United Kingdom	The cargo ship sprang a leak and put into Larne, County Antrim. She was beached there the next day.

=== 29 January ===
List of shipwrecks: 29 January 1925
Ship	State	Description
Commack	United States	The schooner was driven ashore at False Hook, New Jersey. Some of her crew were taken off by a United States Coast Guard vessel. She was refloated on 1 February.
HMINS Elphinstone	Royal Indian Marine	The Anchusa-class sloop struck an uncharted rock off Castle Point, Tillanchong Island, Nicobar Islands, and sank. All 136 crew survived.
USS S-48	United States Navy	The S-class submarine ran aground off Jeffrey Point, New Hampshire. She was refloated a week later. Subsequently repaired and returned to service.

=== 30 January ===
List of shipwrecks: 30 January 1925
Ship	State	Description
Gladys	United Kingdom	The sailing ship came ashore and sank at Vlissingen, Netherlands.

== February ==
=== 1 February ===
List of shipwrecks: 1 February 1925
Ship	State	Description
Skjoldli	Norway	The cargo ship ran aground in Kyrkesund, Sweden and was a total loss.

=== 2 February ===
List of shipwrecks: 2 February 1925
Ship	State	Description
Chyko	United Kingdom	The coaster ran aground on the Fungu Miza Reef and was beached at Dar es Salaam, Tanganyika.
Sara	Italy	The cargo ship struck rocks in the Adriatic Sea off Fano and sank with the loss of one of her crew.

=== 3 February ===
List of shipwrecks: 3 February 1925
Ship	State	Description
Altai Maru	Japan	The cargo ship caught fire and was beached at Belawan, Dutch East Indies. She was refloated on 24 February.

=== 7 February ===
List of shipwrecks: 7 February 1925
Ship	State	Description
Unidentified launch	Imperial Japanese Navy	A steam launch belonging to the cruiser Izumo (Imperial Japanese Navy) was sunk in a collision with a tugboat owned by the Canadian Pacific Ocean Railroad at Vancouver, British Columbia, Canada. 11 crewmen were killed.

=== 9 February ===
List of shipwrecks: 9 February 1925
Ship	State	Description
Kilindili	India	The coaster sank on a voyage from Mangalore to Malepi with the loss of seventeen lives.
Tosa	Imperial Japanese Navy	Tosa sinking The incomplete Tosa-class battleship was scuttled in Saiki Bay in the Bungo Channel under the terms of the Washington Naval Treaty.

=== 10 February ===
List of shipwrecks: 10 February 1925
Ship	State	Description
Muriel	United Kingdom	The Thames barge foundered in the Thames Estuary off Canvey Island, Essex with the loss of one of her two crew.

=== 14 February ===
List of shipwrecks: 14 February 1925
Ship	State	Description
Sendeja	Spain	The cargo ship ran aground at Civitavecchia, Rome, Italy. She was refloated on 25 February.

=== 15 February ===
List of shipwrecks: 15 February 1925
Ship	State	Description
Hasselor	Denmark	The sand sucker collided with Moren (Denmark) at Copenhagen and sank.
Mansuria	Sweden	The cargo ship ran aground on Lillgrund in the Öresund. She was refloated on 18 February.

=== 16 February ===
List of shipwrecks: 16 February 1925
Ship	State	Description
Puren	Chile	The cargo ship foundered in the Pacific Ocean 30 nautical miles (56 km) north of Valparaíso.

=== 17 February ===
List of shipwrecks: 17 February 1925
Ship	State	Description
Asator	Belgium	The cargo ship sprang a leak and was abandoned in the Atlantic Ocean (49°00′N 03°20′W). She later sank, but her crew were rescued by El Kantara (France).

=== 21 February ===
List of shipwrecks: 21 February 1925
Ship	State	Description
Normanna	Norway	The cargo ship arrived at Tenerife, Canary Isles, Spain with her cargo on fire and was beached.

=== 22 February ===
List of shipwrecks: 22 February 1925
Ship	State	Description
Castlereagh	United Kingdom	The coaster passed Prawle Point, Devon bound for Shoreham-by-Sea, Sussex. No further trace, presumed foundered in the English Channel with the loss of all hands.

=== 23 February ===
List of shipwrecks: 23 February 1925
Ship	State	Description
Caithness	United Kingdom	The cargo ship ran aground in the Paraná River, Argentina. She was refloated on 8 March.

=== 24 February ===
List of shipwrecks: 24 February 1925
Ship	State	Description
Boshomaru	Japan	The training ship foundered off the coast of Japan with the loss of six lives.
Galdames	Spain	The cargo ship collided with the quayside at La Rochelle, Charente-Maritime, France and sank.
Koanmaru	Japan	The cargo ship foundered off the coast of Japan.

=== 25 February ===
List of shipwrecks: 25 February 1925
Ship	State	Description
Belita	Norway	The cargo ship sprang a leak and sank at New York, United States.
Cristina Rueda	Spain	The cargo ship sank in the Bay of Biscay 4 nautical miles (7.4 km) off La Rochelle, Charente-Maritime, France, with the loss of all hands. Seven lifeboatmen were also lost attempting a rescue. She broke up the next day in a gale and was a total loss.
USS Huron	United States Navy	The Pennsylvania-class cruiser ran aground off Palawayan Island, Netherlands East Indies. She was refloated the next day.
Panama	United States	During a voyage in Southeast Alaska from Santa Anna to Ketchikan with three crewmen and a cargo of 25 tons of fresh herring aboard, the 25-gross register ton, 50.1-foot (15.3 m) fishing vessel sank in three minutes in Clarence Strait in the Alexander Archipelago between Cape Camano and Guard Island after her seams opened.
Teesdale	United Kingdom	The cargo ship caught fire in the North Sea. She was abandoned 6 nautical miles (11 km) off the Dutch coast. All her crew were rescued by a Dutch pilot boat.
Winga	France	The cargo ship struck rocks off the Isle of Skye and was beached in Loch Scaur. She was refloated on 12 March.

=== 27 February ===
List of shipwrecks: 27 February 1925
Ship	State	Description
Montlaurier	Canada	The ocean liner developed a fault in her steering gear whilst on a voyage to Canada. She returned to Cobh, County Cork, Ireland where she was beached and her passengers were taken off. Subsequently refloated and towed to Liverpool, Lancashire for repairs.

=== 28 February ===
List of shipwrecks: 28 February 1925
Ship	State	Description
Hans Jensen	Denmark	The cargo ship ran aground in the Paraná River, Argentina. She was refloated on 9 March.
Villasandino	Spain	The cargo ship was abandoned in the Atlantic Ocean off Land's End, Cornwall, United Kingdom. Her crew were rescued by British Chancellor (United Kingdom). She came ashore at Bude.

== March ==
=== 1 March ===
List of shipwrecks: 1 March 1925
Ship	State	Description
James M. Hudson	United States	The barge, being towed by T. J. Hooper (United States), was lost two miles (3.2 km) south south east of the Boston Light. Lost with all four hands and the captain's daughter.

=== 4 March ===
List of shipwrecks: 4 March 1925
Ship	State	Description
Flevo	United Kingdom	The cargo ship caught fire in the Indian Ocean and was abandoned 40 nautical miles (74 km) off Tandjung Priok, Netherlands East Indies with the loss of nine of her crew. Although reported to have sunk, she was towed into Batavia later that day.
Ravenscar	United Kingdom	The cargo ship collided with Ingerfire (Norway) off Vlissingen, Netherlands and was beached at Sardyngeul. She was refloated on 1 April.

=== 5 March ===
List of shipwrecks: 5 March 1925
Ship	State	Description
Vera	United Kingdom	The 140-foot (43 m) steam trawler stranded at Myrdalssandur, Iceland, a Total Loss. Crew saved.

=== 8 March ===
List of shipwrecks: 8 March 1925
Ship	State	Description
Aalsum	Netherlands	The cargo ship collided with Dannedaike (United States) in the Atlantic Ocean 25 nautical miles (46 km) south of Nantucket, Massachusetts. Although abandoned by her crew, she was later reboarded.

=== 9 March ===
List of shipwrecks: 9 March 1925
Ship	State	Description
Schelde	Netherlands	The tug was driven onto the south breakwater at Hook of Holland, Netherlands whilst going to the assistance of Soerakarta (Netherlands). She sank with the loss of eight of her fifteen crew. The survivors were rescued by rocket apparatus.
Soerakarta	Netherlands	The cargo ship was driven onto the north breakwater at Hook of Holland. Lifeboats rescued 48 crew, leaving her officers on board. They were rescued the next day. Although salvage operations were reported to have been abandoned on 13 March, she was cut in two. A 350-foot (110 m) section of her 430-foot (130 m) length was refloated by 9 April and towed to Rotterdam. The bow section sank on 16 April and was a total loss.

=== 11 March ===
List of shipwrecks: 11 March 1925
Ship	State	Description
Phyllis	United Kingdom	The four-masted barque departed Adelaide, South Australia for the United Kingdom. Reported missing on 6 August.
Stella Maris	United Kingdom	The sealer was crushed by ice in Notre Dame Bay, Newfoundland. Her crew were rescued by Prospero (United Kingdom).

=== 12 March ===
List of shipwrecks: 12 March 1925
Ship	State	Description
Uwajima Maru	Japan	The passenger ship foundered off Kyushu with the loss of 102 of the 118 people on board.

=== 13 March ===
List of shipwrecks: 13 March 1925
Ship	State	Description
Anine	Denmark	The cargo ship passed Gibraltar bound for Civitavecchia, Italy. No further trace, presumed foundered in the Mediterranean Sea with the loss of all hands.
Phyllis Hudson	United Kingdom	The cargo ship ran aground on the Brake Sands, Thames Estuary. Her crew were rescued by the Ramsgate Lifeboat and she was subsequently towed into Ramsgate, Kent by Aid (United Kingdom).

=== 14 March ===
List of shipwrecks: 14 March 1925
Ship	State	Description
Kozan Maru No.1	Japan	The cargo ship departed Chichijima for Shimoda. No further trace.
Modesta	Norway	The cargo ship ran aground in the Paraná River, Argentina. She was refloated on 26 March.

=== 15 March ===
List of shipwrecks: 15 March 1925
Ship	State	Description
Erissos	Greece	The cargo ship ran aground in the Paraná River at Arroyos Secos, Santa Fe, Argentina.
Jameson	United Kingdom	The cargo ship ran aground in the Paraná River at Arroyos Secos.

=== 16 March ===
List of shipwrecks: 16 March 1925
Ship	State	Description
Josefita	Spain	The cargo ship was abandoned in the Atlantic Ocean (36°43′N 8°20′W). Her crew were rescued by Knut (Denmark).
Scampolo	Italy	The cargo ship was abandoned in the Tyrrhenian Sea 15 nautical miles (28 km) west of Capri.
Vulcano	Italy	The cargo ship ran aground in the Paraná River at Rosario, Argentina. She was refloated on 20 March.

=== 19 March ===
List of shipwrecks: 19 March 1925
Ship	State	Description
Bienville	United States	The cargo ship caught fire at New Orleans, Louisiana and was beached. She was refloated on 22 March. Her hull was intact but her superstructure was destroyed.

=== 20 March ===
List of shipwrecks: 20 March 1925
Ship	State	Description
Swona	Norway	The whaler foundered on a voyage from South Georgia to Cape Town, South Africa. Her crew were rescued.
Thyra	Sweden	The cargo ship collided with Ardmore (United States) in the Atlantic Ocean 125 nautical miles (232 km) south of Sandy Hook, New Jersey, United States and sank. Her crew survived.

=== 21 March ===
List of shipwrecks: 21 March 1925
Ship	State	Description
Cité de Verdun	France	The steam-trawler struck Rosevear an island in the Western Rocks, Isles of Scilly during a snowstorm. The crew of thirty landed, lit a fire and sent distress signals which were answered by the St Mary's lifeboat Elsie ( Royal National Lifeboat Institution). The nameboards of the trawler can still be seen in the Mermaid and Atlantic public houses on St Mary's.
City of Brisbane	Australia	The iron paddle steamer was scuttled off Sydney Heads on 21 March 1925.

=== 23 March ===
List of shipwrecks: 23 March 1925
Ship	State	Description
Notre Dame de Lourdes	France	The schooner foundered in the Atlantic Ocean (48°35′N 5°25′W). Some of her seven crew were rescued by Iroise (France) and others landed at Ouessant in a lifeboat.

=== 24 March ===
List of shipwrecks: 24 March 1925
Ship	State	Description
Guipuzcoa	Spain	The cargo ship ran aground at Les Baleines, Loire-Inférieure, France. Her crew were taken off by the tug Atlas (France) on 26 March and she was declared a total loss on 30 March.

=== 27 March ===
List of shipwrecks: 27 March 1925
Ship	State	Description
Ethel	United Kingdom	The coaster capsized and sank in Liverpool Bay. All seven crew were rescued by Harlaw Plain (United Kingdom).
Yetajima Maru	Japan	The cargo ship collided with Tsugaru Maru (Japan) at Kobe and sank.

=== 28 March ===
List of shipwrecks: 28 March 1925
Ship	State	Description
Aysgarth Force	United Kingdom	The cargo ship foundered in the North Sea off the Maas Lightship (Netherlands) with the loss of a crew member. Survivors were rescued by Maasdijk (Netherlands).

=== 30 March ===
List of shipwrecks: 30 March 1925
Ship	State	Description
Asturiano	Argentina	The cargo liner collided with Buenos Aires (Argentina) at Puerto San Julian and was beached.
Lavinia	United Kingdom	The coaster ran aground off Norderney, Germany. She was refloated on 5 April.

=== 31 March ===
List of shipwrecks: 31 March 1925
Ship	State	Description
Mazzini	Italy	The cargo ship ran aground on Graciosa, Azores, Portugal. She broke in two on 5 April and was a total loss.

== April ==
=== 2 April ===
List of shipwrecks: 2 April 1925
Ship	State	Description
Ferncliff	Norway	The cargo ship ran aground off Ras-al-Bir, Italian Somaliland (12°00′N 43°34′E). She was refloated on 6 April.
Kozan Maru	Japan	The cargo ship foundered off Idzu.

=== 3 April ===
List of shipwrecks: 3 April 1925
Ship	State	Description
Cisneros	United Kingdom	The cargo liner caught fire in the Bay of Biscay off the coast of Finistère, France, and was abandoned. She was declared a constructive total loss.

=== 4 April ===
List of shipwrecks: 4 April 1925
Ship	State	Description
Candiano	Italy	The cargo ship caught fire at Brindisi, Libya and was a total loss.

=== 5 April ===
List of shipwrecks: 5 April 1925
Ship	State	Description
Hachijo Maru	Japan	The cargo ship sank off Hachiji Island.

=== 7 April ===
List of shipwrecks: 7 April 1925
Ship	State	Description
Elizabeth Hyam	United Kingdom	The schooner sank at Ramsey, Isle of Man.

=== 10 April ===
List of shipwrecks: 10 April 1925
Ship	State	Description
Bresil	France	The cargo ship ran aground 30 nautical miles (56 km) of Cap St. James, French Indochina. She broke up and was a total loss.
Jonge Catharina	Netherlands	The cargo ship collided with Clan Monroe (United Kingdom) in the Scheldt and sank with the loss of fifteen of her 24 crew. Survivors were rescued by Clan Monroe and a tug.
Tannenfels	Germany	The cargo ship ran aground 10 nautical miles (19 km) west of Karachi, India and was severely damaged.

=== 12 April ===
List of shipwrecks: 12 April 1925
Ship	State	Description
Folden I	Norway	The cargo ship collided with Volos (Germany) and sank in the English Channel at a position between the Royal Sovereign Lightvessel (United Kingdom) and Dungeness, Kent, United Kingdom. Her crew were rescued by Volos.

=== 13 April ===
List of shipwrecks: 13 April 1925
Ship	State	Description
Challenge	United Kingdom	The Thames barge collided with Lisken (Norway) in the English Channel off Cherbourg, France, and sank with the loss of three of the four people on board.
Francesco	Italy	The schooner was driven ashore at Benghazi, Libya and was wrecked. Her crew survived.
Valrossa	Italy	The cargo ship caught fire at Philadelphia, Pennsylvania, United States and was beached.

=== 14 April ===
List of shipwrecks: 14 April 1925
Ship	State	Description
Marion	United Kingdom	The schooner ran aground on Splough Rock, off Greenore Point, County Louth, Ireland and was wrecked.
Montlaurier	United Kingdom	The ocean liner caught fire at Birkenhead, Cheshire whilst under repair and was severely damaged. She was subsequently repaired and returned to service in July 1925 as Montnairn.

=== 16 April ===
List of shipwrecks: 16 April 1925
Ship	State	Description
S.A.C.	Spain	The cargo ship collided with Millgate (United Kingdom) in the Mediterranean Sea off Cartagena, Murcia and sank. Her 28 crew were rescued by Millgate.

=== 17 April ===
List of shipwrecks: 17 April 1925
Ship	State	Description
Trehawke	United Kingdom	The cargo ship ran aground near Cape Upright, Chile and was abandoned. Her crew were rescued by Toluma (Norway).

=== 21 April ===
List of shipwrecks: 21 April 1925
Ship	State	Description
O-2	Imperial Japanese Navy	The Type U-43 submarine foundered off Japan in a storm. (Some sources claim O-2 was scrapped in 1922.)
Raifuku Maru	Japan	The cargo ship sank in a storm in the North Atlantic with the loss of all 38 crew.

=== 28 April ===
List of shipwrecks: 28 April 1925
Ship	State	Description
Innono	United States	The cargo ship collided with Isis (Germany) in the Scheldt at Antwerp, Belgium, and was beached.
Shima Maru	Japan	The cargo ship ran aground in the Yangtze, China. She was refloated on 7 May.

=== 29 April ===
List of shipwrecks: 29 April 1925
Ship	State	Description
Irma	United States	The schooner came ashore 14 nautical miles (26 km) north of Body's Island, North Carolina and was abandoned.

=== Unknown date ===
List of shipwrecks: Unknown date 1925
Ship	State	Description
HMS Dolphin	Royal Navy	The Dolphin-class gunvessel foundered in the Firth of Forth. She was refloated on 23 September.
Rhesus	United Kingdom	The cargo ship collided with Canton (Sweden) in the Great Bitter Lake, Suez Canal over the Easter weekend and was beached.

== May ==
=== 1 May ===
List of shipwrecks: 1 May 1925
Ship	State	Description
Azov	United Kingdom	The cargo ship ran aground at Cape Hogan, Nova Scotia, and was a total loss.
Moldegaard	Norway	The cargo ship ran aground at Pennant Point, Nova Scotia, and was wrecked.

=== 2 May ===
List of shipwrecks: 2 May 1925
Ship	State	Description
Kelly Island	United States	The barge capsized in Lake Erie near Point Pelee when crewmen, without orders, removed a 16-inch (410 mm) suction hose and plate flooding the barge. Nine crewmen killed, seven rescued by the tug Flossie B. (United States).

=== 8 May ===
List of shipwrecks: 1 May 1925
Ship	State	Description
M.E. Norman	United States	The sternwheel steamboat capsized and sank in the Mississippi River near Cow Island Bend with the loss of 23 lives. Thirty-two people were saved.

=== 9 May ===
List of shipwrecks: 9 May 1925
Ship	State	Description
USCGC AB-3	United States Coast Guard	The United States Coast Guard cutter, formerly the patrol boat USS Cossack (United States Navy), was destroyed by fire.
Gladys E. Bullen		The schooner came ashore on the west coast of Miquelon and was wrecked.
Hans Jensen	Denmark	The cargo ship was wrecked on the coast of Nova Scotia.
Yutaka Maru	Japan	The passenger ship came ashore near Sasebo, Nagasaki. Her passengers were taken off.

=== 10 May ===
List of shipwrecks: 10 May 1925
Ship	State	Description
Glenluce	United Kingdom	The cargo liner ran aground at Cairnbulg Briggs, Aberdeenshire. She was refloated on 20 May.
Mohican	United States	The cargo ship burned and sank off Cape Canaveral, Florida. Wreck eventually dispersed with explosives by the US Coast Guard.
Sakurajima Maru	Japan	The cargo ship collided with Taiko Maru No.2 (Japan) off Shimonoseki and was beached.

=== 11 May ===
List of shipwrecks: 11 May 1925
Ship	State	Description
Orion	Sweden	The schooner collided with Seemoos (Germany) in the Baltic Sea off Ystad and sank with the loss of three crew.

=== 12 May ===
List of shipwrecks: 12 May 1925
Ship	State	Description
Morican	United States	The cargo ship caught fire at Jacksonville, Florida, and was beached.

=== 14 May ===
List of shipwrecks: 14 May 1925
Ship	State	Description
Rytoner	United Kingdom	The coaster was rammed and sunk in the English Channel off Beachy Head, East Sussex, by Lyngern (Sweden). Her crew were rescued by Lyngern.

=== 15 May ===
List of shipwrecks: 15 May 1925
Ship	State	Description
Corcrest	United Kingdom	The cargo ship collided with Chevington (United Kingdom) in the River Thames and was beached. She was refloated later that day.
Pennyworth	United Kingdom	The cargo ship ran aground in the River Neva at Leningrad, Soviet Union. She was refloated on 19 May.

=== 18 May ===
List of shipwrecks: 18 May 1925
Ship	State	Description
Dunard	United Kingdom	The cargo ship ran aground in the Bay of Biscay 3 nautical miles (5.6 km) off Roscoff, Finistère, France. Her crew were rescued. She later capsized and was a total loss.
Wm. P. Fiske	United States	The tow steamer capsized and sank during the night in the Cumberland River just above Lock No.2. The crew was surprised in their cabins, three crew and the wife of the fireman drowned, five crew survived. Later raised.

=== 19 May ===
List of shipwrecks: 19 May 1925
Ship	State	Description
Margaret Spencer	United States	The schooner came ashore at the Oregon Inlet and was wrecked.
Spain Maru	Japan	The cargo ship ran aground at Cape Miyagi (38°19′N 141°33′E). She broke in two on 12 June and was a total loss.

=== 20 May ===
List of shipwrecks: 20 May 1925
Ship	State	Description
Vis	United States	During a gale, the 17-gross register ton, 41-foot (12 m) fishing vessel struck rocks and became stranded at Long Island in Kasaan Bay on the coast of Southeast Alaska. After Louisiana (United States) pulled Vis off the rocks, Vis sank in deep water in Kasaan Bay. Her two-man crew survived.

=== 21 May ===
List of shipwrecks: 21 May 1925
Ship	State	Description
Imerethie II	France	The cargo ship ran aground at San Stefano Point, Turkey. She was refloated on 25 May.

=== 22 May ===
List of shipwrecks: 22 May 1925
Ship	State	Description
An Lan	United Kingdom	The tanker was wrecked near Chunking, China.
Berlin	Denmark	The cargo ship struck a rock off Corrobdo, A Coruña, Spain and was beached. She was refloated on 26 May.
County of Cardigan	United Kingdom	The cargo ship ran aground at Cape Cée, Corcubión, Spain. She was declared a total loss on 26 May.

=== 23 May ===
List of shipwrecks: 23 May 1925
Ship	State	Description
Blus	Norway	The cargo ship ran aground in Canelinas Bay, Spain and was a total loss.
Border Glen	United Kingdom	The coaster foundered in the North Sea 4 nautical miles (7.4 km) south south west of Findochty, Morayshire. All five crew survived.
Kilelmi	Turkey	The coaster foundered in the Bosporus with the loss of 44 of the 49 people on board.
Sceptre	United Kingdom	The cargo ship ran aground at Cap L'Agulhas, South Africa. She broke her back on 27 May and was a total loss.

=== 24 May ===
List of shipwrecks: 24 May 1925
Ship	State	Description
Cyrenia	United Kingdom	The cargo ship ran aground at Whanganui, North Island, New Zealand. She broke in two on 28 May. Cyrenia was subsequently scrapped in situ.
Ebro	Norway	The cargo ship ran aground at Puerto Plata, Dominican Republic. She was refloated on 28 May.
Lesbian	United Kingdom	The cargo ship ran aground at Kephez, Turkey. She was refloated on 27 May.

=== 25 May ===
List of shipwrecks: 25 May 1925
Ship	State	Description
Fiona	United Kingdom	The coaster ran aground on Trinity Ledge, Nova Scotia. She refloated, capsized and sank. Her crew survived.
Young America	United States	The 34-gross register ton, 51-foot (16 m) fishing vessel was destroyed by a fire at Sitka, Territory of Alaska, that began with a gasoline explosion that occurred just after she finished taking on fuel. There was no loss of life.

=== 26 May ===
List of shipwrecks: 26 May 1925
Ship	State	Description
Ekaterina Inglessi	Greece	The cargo ship was abandoned in the Mediterranean Sea (34°34′N 27°52′E). Her crew were rescued by Herefordshire (United Kingdom). She was towed into Port Said, Egypt by HMS Delhi (Royal Navy).
Morowitz	Hungary	The cargo ship ran aground at La Plata, Argentina. She was refloated on 5 June.

=== 27 May ===
List of shipwrecks: 27 May 1925
Ship	State	Description
Hans	Sweden	The auxiliary schooner struck a mine in the Baltic Sea off Gotland and sank with the loss of seven of her eight crew.
Joffre	United Kingdom	The tug ran aground on the Bolt Tail Rocks, Devon. Eleven crew were rescued by rocket apparatus.
Ludlow	United States	The schooner was destroyed by fire at Gulfport, Mississippi.

=== 29 May ===
List of shipwrecks: 29 May 1925
Ship	State	Description
Barbara	United States	The 29-gross register ton, 50-foot (15.2 m) motor vessel was wrecked on a rock off Shipwreck Point (54°53′53″N 132°29′30″W) in Southeast Alaska after her gasoline engine broke down. Her crew survived and spent the day on the rock before the mail boat Carmen (United States) sighted and rescued them.
Lundy Light	United Kingdom	The cargo ship ran aground on Martín García Island, Argentina. She was refloated on 1 June.
Reliant	Ireland	The salvage vessel foundered in the Atlantic Ocean 400 nautical miles (740 km) west of Tory Island, County Donegal.

=== 31 May ===
List of shipwrecks: 31 May 1925
Ship	State	Description
Florence Swyres	United Kingdom	The schooner sprang a leak and foundered in the Strait of Gibraltar off Tarifa, Andalusia, Spain.

== June ==
=== 1 June ===
List of shipwrecks: 1 June 1925
Ship	State	Description
Fair City	United Kingdom	The cargo ship struck the quayside at Dundee, Forfarshire and was beached severely damaged at the bow.

=== 3 June ===
List of shipwrecks: 3 June 1925
Ship	State	Description
Bombay Maru	Japan	The cargo ship ran aground at Notoro, Karafuto. She was refloated on 15 July.

=== 5 June ===
List of shipwrecks: 5 June 1925
Ship	State	Description
Duxbury	United States	Carrying a 30-ton cargo of general merchandise, the 38-gross register ton motor vessel was crushed in ice and lost in the Beaufort Sea approximately 0.5 nautical miles (0.9 km; 0.6 mi) northeast of Cape Halkett (70°48′10″N 152°11′05″W) on the north coast of the Territory of Alaska. Her crew of six survived.

=== 6 June ===
List of shipwrecks: 6 June 1925
Ship	State	Description
Africanic	Sweden	The cargo ship collided with Northlea (United Kingdom) in the Atlantic Ocean off Cape Toriñana, Spain (43°04′N 90°25′W) and sank. Her crew were rescued by Nord (France).
Union Gujera	Spain	The cargo ship ran aground at Gijón, Asturias and was wrecked.

=== 7 June ===
List of shipwrecks: 7 June 1925
Ship	State	Description
Essu	United States	The 9-gross register ton, 32-foot (9.8 m) fishing vessel burned and sank without loss of life while moored at the wharf at Port Alexander, Territory of Alaska. She later was salvaged and returned to service.

=== 10 June ===
List of shipwrecks: 10 June 1925
Ship	State	Description
Demosthenes	Greece	The cargo ship ran aground in the Comoros Islands. She was abandoned as a total loss, her crew were rescued by General Foch (flag unknown).
Leodium	Belgium	The cargo ship ran aground in the Paraná River at Rosario, Santa Fe, Argentina. She was refloated on 27 December.

=== 11 June ===
List of shipwrecks: 11 June 1925
Ship	State	Description
Aebo	Denmark	The three-masted schooner came ashore at Terceira Island, Azores, Portugal and was wrecked.
West Saginaw	United States	The Design 1013 cargo ship struck a submerged object in the Atlantic Ocean and was beached at Nantucket, Massachusetts. She was refloated the next day.

=== 12 June ===
List of shipwrecks: 12 June 1925
Ship	State	Description
Aikaterini M. Goulandris	Greece	The cargo ship ran aground at Maryport, Cumberland. She was refloated on 13 June and was then beached.
Equity	United Kingdom	The coaster collided with Rena (United Kingdom) in the North Sea off the Would Lightship (United Kingdom) and was beached at Horsey, Norfolk.
Europe	France	The Boulogne steam-trawler struck Rosevear, an island in the Western Rocks, Isles of Scilly in fog. As the tide rose the trawler floated off the rocks and made for Dunkirk with slight damage.

=== 13 June ===
List of shipwrecks: 13 June 1925
Ship	State	Description
Norseman	United Kingdom	The cargo ship collided with Burnside (United Kingdom) in the North Sea off Great Yarmouth, Norfolk and sank with the loss of two crew. The survivors were rescued by Burnside.

=== 14 June ===
List of shipwrecks: 14 June 1925
Ship	State	Description
Lilyada	Italy	The cargo ship collided with Cabo Mendor (Spain) in the Atlantic Ocean (38°55′N 9°35′W) and sank. Her crew were rescued by Cabo Mendor.

=== 15 June ===
List of shipwrecks: 15 June 1925
Ship	State	Description
Virginius	United States	While under tow by Katherine D (United States) from Port Moller to Ketchikan, Territory of Alaska, the 35-gross register ton, 56.4-foot (17.2 m) motor fishing schooner's towline parted in high winds and heavy seas and she sank in the Bering Sea at 54°55′N 165°50′W. No one was aboard Virginius and she was carrying no cargo.

=== 16 June ===
List of shipwrecks: 16 June 1925
Ship	State	Description
Corvallis	United States	The retired cargo ship, portraying the fictional ocean liner Mandalay, was deliberately blown up by First National Pictures in the North Atlantic Ocean 45 nautical miles (83 km; 52 mi) east of Harvey Cedars, New Jersey, during filming of the 1925 movie The Half-Way Girl. Her forward section sank in 140 feet (43 m) of water, but her stern remained afloat after the explosion and the United States Coast Guard had to sink it.
Oakwood	United States	The cargo ship ran aground in Lake Erie. She was refloated on 30 June or 8 July, according to conflicting reports.

=== 18 June ===
List of shipwrecks: 18 June 1925
Ship	State	Description
Chelanthos	Greece	The cargo ship ran aground in the Paraná River, Argentina.

=== 19 June ===
List of shipwrecks: 19 June 1925
Ship	State	Description
Ioannis D	Greece	The cargo ship ran aground near Cape St. Vincent, Portugal. She was a total loss.
Mimi	Germany	The cargo ship ran aground in the Paraná River, Argentina. She was refloated on 2 September.
Waimate	Italy	The cargo ship ran aground 5 nautical miles (9.3 km) north east of Cape St. Vincent. She was abandoned on 22 June.

=== 20 June ===
List of shipwrecks: 20 June 1925
Ship	State	Description
Samoa	United Kingdom	The three-masted auxiliary schooner was driven ashore at Nassau, Bahamas and was wrecked.
Valencia	Spain	The coaster was rammed and sunk by Alvarez Sala (Spain) at Valencia and sank. Her crew survived.

=== 24 June ===
List of shipwrecks: 24 June 1925
Ship	State	Description
Edendale	United Kingdom	The cargo ship ran aground off Belitung, Netherlands East Indies. She was refloated on 29 June.
Goshu Maru	Japan	The cargo ship came ashore 260 nautical miles (480 km) north of Vladivostok, Soviet Union. Although declared a total loss, she was refloated on 29 July.

=== 26 June ===
List of shipwrecks: 26 June 1925
Ship	State	Description
Fushiki Maru	Japan	The cargo ship came ashore at Shiritokosaki, Hokkaidō and was wrecked.

=== 27 June ===
List of shipwrecks: 27 June 1925
Ship	State	Description
Boulinier	France	The schooner came ashore at Fort-de-France, Martinique and was a total loss.
Ocean King	United Kingdom	The tug was struck by Marloch (United Kingdom) at Quebec City, Canada and sank with the loss of all hands.

=== 28 June ===
List of shipwrecks: 28 June 1925
Ship	State	Description
Wales Maru	Japan	The cargo ship ran aground in the Banka Strait. She was refloated on 6 July.
West Hesseltine	United States	The Design 1013 ship ran aground on Maio, Cape Verde Islands. Most of her passengers and crew were taken off in early July by Sagres (United States). She was refloated on 2 October.

=== 29 June ===
List of shipwrecks: 29 June 1925
Ship	State	Description
Bartolo	Spain	The cargo ship collided with Rose Schiaffino (France) in the Strait of Gibraltar and sank.
Rex	United States	The schooner was rammed and sunk in the Atlantic Ocean 300 nautical miles (560 km) off Halifax, Nova Scotia, Canada by Aurania (United Kingdom) with the loss of fifteen of her 24 crew. Survivors were rescued by Aurania.

=== 30 June ===
List of shipwrecks: 30 June 1925
Ship	State	Description
Tonshin Maru	Japan	The cargo ship ran aground on Sakhalin and was a total loss.

== July ==
=== 3 July ===
List of shipwrecks: 3 July 1925
Ship	State	Description
Ville d'Isigny	France	The cargo ship sank at Brest, Finistère.

=== 5 July ===
List of shipwrecks: 5 July 1925
Ship	State	Description
Herculese	United Kingdom	The tug was struck by Akabo (United Kingdom) at Lagos, Nigeria and sank with the loss of six crew.

=== 6 July ===
List of shipwrecks: 6 July 1925
Ship	State	Description
Pinafore Park swan boat	Canada	A swan boat carrying 24 people including 21 children capsized at Pinafore Park in St. Thomas killing seven children and one out of the two adults on board.

=== 10 July ===
List of shipwrecks: 10 July 1925
Ship	State	Description
Halgan	France	The cargo ship ran aground at Pernambuco, Brazil. She was refloated on 30 August.
Thomas P. Beal	United States	The cargo ship struck rocks in the East River, New York and was beached. She was refloated the next day.

=== 11 July ===
List of shipwrecks: 11 July 1925
Ship	State	Description
Loongwo	United Kingdom	The cargo ship struck rocks in the Yangtze 250 nautical miles (460 km) downstream of Hankow, China and was beached. She was refloated the next day.
Singapore Maru	Japan	The Daifuku Maru No. 1-class cargo ship ran aground 30 miles (48 km) east of Perim, Yemen in the Red Sea. She was pulled off on 17 July by the salvage vessel Meyun after jettisoning most of her cargo, some of which was retrieved.

=== 13 July ===
List of shipwrecks: 13 July 1925
Ship	State	Description
Esquilino	Italy	The cargo ship ran aground on the Shumna Reef off Massowah, Italian Somaliland. She was refloated on 26 July.

=== 14 July ===
List of shipwrecks: 14 July 1925
Ship	State	Description
Hebbedale	United Kingdom	The cargo ship ran aground in the River Plate, South America. She was refloated on 28 August.
Roxanna Frances	United States	The schooner was in collision with Ellaston (United Kingdom) at Chesapeake, Ohio and sank.

=== 15 July ===
List of shipwrecks: 15 July 1925
Ship	State	Description
Luisa	Chile	The cargo ship ran aground south of Tacahualco. She was refloated on 20 July.

=== 17 July ===
List of shipwrecks: 17 July 1925
Ship	State	Description
Refloater	United Kingdom	The salvage vessel collided with HMS Tring (Royal Navy) at Harwich, Essex and was beached. She was refloated on 30 July.

=== 19 July ===
List of shipwrecks: 19 July 1925
Ship	State	Description
Egremont Castle	United Kingdom	The cargo ship ran aground on the Tub-Bataka Reef, Philippines. She slipped off the reef and sank on 26 July.
West Cohas	United States	The Design 1013 cargo ship ran aground on Sable Island, Nova Scotia, Canada.

=== 20 July ===
List of shipwrecks: 20 July 1925
Ship	State	Description
Aghios Spyridon	Greece	The cargo ship ran aground in the Paraná River, Argentina. She was refloated on 25 July.

=== 21 July ===
List of shipwrecks: 21 July 1925
Ship	State	Description
Shirakumo	Imperial Japanese Navy	The decommissioned Shirakumo-class destroyer was sunk as a target in the Bungo Channel off Himeshima, Japan.

=== 22 July ===
List of shipwrecks: 22 July 1925
Ship	State	Description
Cavour	United Kingdom	The cargo ship ran aground of the Ibicuy Islands, Argentina. She was refloated on 25 July.

=== 23 July ===
List of shipwrecks: 23 July 1925
Ship	State	Description
Bayeskimo	United Kingdom	The cargo ship foundered in the Atlantic Ocean (59°15′N 67°15′W). Her crew were rescued by Nascopie (United Kingdom).
Campeiro	Brazil	The cargo ship suffered a failure of her steering gear and came ashore on the coast of Rio Grande do Sul. She was refloated on 1 September.
Ram	United States	The 14-gross register ton, 41.8-foot (12.7 m) motor cargo vessel was wrecked on the Siberian coast of the Soviet Union about 20 nautical miles (37 km; 23 mi) southwest of East Cape (now Cape Dezhnev) after her gasoline engine failed and she was blown ashore. Her crew of four survived.

=== 24 July ===
List of shipwrecks: 24 July 1925
Ship	State	Description
Yewdale	United Kingdom	The cargo ship was driven ashore at Goswick, Northumberland and was wrecked. Her crew survived.

=== 25 July ===
List of shipwrecks: 25 July 1925
Ship	State	Description
Gezina	Norway	The cargo ship ran aground at Dennis Head, North Ronaldsay, Orkney Islands, United Kingdom. She was refloated on 28 July.

=== 27 July ===
List of shipwrecks: 27 July 1925
Ship	State	Description
Jolly Charles	United Kingdom	The coaster ran aground at Penmaenmawr, Caernarfonshire. She was refloated on 4 August.

=== 28 July ===
List of shipwrecks: 28 July 1925
Ship	State	Description
Condor	Chile	The tug foundered in Valparaíso Bay.
Kyodo Maru No.22	Japan	The cargo ship was wrecked on Barren Island, in the Yangtze Estuary. Some of her crew survived.

=== 30 July ===
List of shipwrecks: 30 July 1925
Ship	State	Description
Ingrid	Sweden	The tanker was severely damaged by fire at Constanţa, Romania.

=== 31 July ===
List of shipwrecks: 31 July 1925
Ship	State	Description
Havur	Norway	The cargo ship ran aground in the White Sea at Three Islands, Soviet Union. She was refloated on 4 August.

== August ==
=== 1 August ===
List of shipwrecks: 1 August 1925
Ship	State	Description
Georges	United Kingdom	The cargo ship struck a wreck off Patras, Greece and was beached in Molivo Bay.

=== 2 August ===
List of shipwrecks: 2 August 1925
Ship	State	Description
Alexandre	Belgium	The cargo ship collided with Yang Tse (France) in the Scheldt and sank at Drempel de Parel.
Dreamer	United States	The 23-ton motor vessel was destroyed by fire off Gravina Island opposite Peninsula Point (55.3833°N 131.7333°W) on Revillagigedo Island in the Alexander Archipelago in Southeast Alaska. The only person aboard survived.

=== 3 August ===
List of shipwrecks: 3 August 1925
Ship	State	Description
Attika	Greece	The cargo ship sank at Piraeus.
Thomas and Arthur	United Kingdom	The Thames barge sank in the River Thames at Battersea, London.

=== 5 August ===
List of shipwrecks: 5 August 1925
Ship	State	Description
O-2	Imperial Japanese Navy	The Type U 43 submarine foundered in a storm during a voyage from Yokosuka to Kure, Japan.
Taihoku Maru	Japan	The cargo ship ran aground at Monbetsu, Hokkaidō, Japan. She was refloated on 14 August.

=== 6 August ===
List of shipwrecks: 6 August 1925
Ship	State	Description
Sebastiano Veniero	Italian Royal Navy	The Provana-class submarine sank in the Mediterranean Sea after colliding with the steamer Capena (Italy) off Cape Passero, Sicily.

=== 7 August ===
List of shipwrecks: 7 August 1925
Ship	State	Description
Alfonso	Italy	The sailing ship sprang a leak and foundered in the Mediterranean Sea off Hammamet, Tunisia. Her crew were rescued.
Montrose	United Kingdom	The ocean liner ran aground in the Saint Lawrence River, Canada. She was refloated on 10 August and drydocked for repairs to her rudder and port propeller.
St. Abbs Head	United Kingdom	The cargo ship ran aground north east of the Gunfleet Lighthouse, in the North Sea off the coast of Essex. She was refloated on 11 August.

=== 9 August ===
List of shipwrecks: 9 August 1925
Ship	State	Description
Yue Ying Wa	United Kingdom	The cargo ship foundered in a cyclone whilst on a voyage from Hoihow, China to Hong Kong.

=== 11 August ===
List of shipwrecks: 11 August 1925
Ship	State	Description
Aksala	United States	After her overheated galley stove started a fire that went out of control, the 13-net ton motor vessel was beached and abandoned in Skowl Passage inside Skowl Island (55°25′N 132°16′W) in the Alexander Archipelago in Southeast Alaska. Her crew of five survived, but she became a total loss.
Hustler	United Kingdom	The tug was in collision with the steamship Kaikyu Maru (Japan) at Vancouver, British Columbia, Canada, and sank.

=== 13 August ===
List of shipwrecks: 13 August 1925
Ship	State	Description
Emden	Germany	The cargo ship ran aground in the Boca Jambell Gulf, off the coast of Ecuador. She was refloated on 18 August.

=== 14 August ===
List of shipwrecks: 14 August 1925
Ship	State	Description
Eolo	Spain	The cargo ship ran aground at Kettleness Point, Yorkshire, United Kingdom. She was refloated on 25 August.
St. Marc	France	The cargo ship foundered in the Bay of Biscay off Ouessant, Finistère. Thirteen crew were rescued.

=== 15 August ===
List of shipwrecks: 15 August 1925
Ship	State	Description
Peggy	United States	The 16-gross register ton, 42-foot (12.8 m) or 44-foot (13.4 m) fishing vessel sank at Limestone Point (55°56′50″N 133°36′50″W) in Southeast Alaska. Her crew of four survived.

=== 16 August ===
List of shipwrecks: 16 August 1925
Ship	State	Description
Ionion	Greece	The cargo ship ran aground at Buitra Point, near Cape Toriñana, Spain and was a total loss.

=== 17 August ===
List of shipwrecks: 17 August 1925
Ship	State	Description
Caudebec	France	The ferry collided with Borthwick (United Kingdom) in the Seine at Rouen, Seine-Inférieure and was beached.
Ella	Denmark	The schooner sprang a leak and sank in the Baltic Sea off Skanör, Scania, Sweden. Her crew were rescued.

=== 21 August ===
List of shipwrecks: 21 August 1925
Ship	State	Description
Pursuit	United Kingdom	The schooner collided with the ketch Boy Will (France) in Bigbury Bay. Both vessels were severely damaged and were beached at Salcombe, Devon where they broke up.

=== 23 August ===
List of shipwrecks: 23 August 1925
Ship	State	Description
Therimal	Finland	The barque collided with the fishing vessel Christina Catarina (Netherlands) in the North Sea (approximately 55°N 4°E) and sank with the loss of her captain. Survivors were rescued by Christina Catarina.
1605	China	The fishing junk was in collision with Talthybius (United Kingdom) off Waglan Island, Hong Kong and sank. She was fishing at night with no lights and no blame was laid on Talthybius.

=== 24 August ===
List of shipwrecks: 24 August 1925
Ship	State	Description
Southland	United States	The cargo ship was destroyed by fire in Lake Pontchartrain, Louisiana.

=== 26 August ===
List of shipwrecks: 26 August 1925
Ship	State	Description
Esther	Sweden	The schooner collided with Maolner (Sweden) off Malmö and sank. Her crew were rescued by Maolner.
President Garfield	United Kingdom	The ocean liner ran aground at Nantucket, Massachusetts. She was refloated the next day.

=== 28 August ===
List of shipwrecks: 28 August 1925
Ship	State	Description
Nantais	France	The cargo ship ran aground 2 nautical miles (3.7 km) off La Jument, Ouessant, Finistère and was wrecked. Her crew survived.

=== Unknown date ===
List of shipwrecks: Unknown date 1925
Ship	State	Description
Bari	Regia Marina	The Pillau-class cruiser ran aground off Palermo, Sicily. She was refloated on 20 September.
Brulin	Canada	The lake freighter ran aground at the head of the Morrisburg Canal in Morrisburg, Ontario, Canada. She was refloated, repaired, and returned to service.
Elna	Finland	The barque foundered in the Baltic Sea north of Gotland, Sweden. Nine crew were rescued by Amisia (Germany).

== September ==
=== 1 September ===
List of shipwrecks: 1 September 1925
Ship	State	Description
Colonial	United States	The passenger ship was destroyed by fire at Cleveland, Ohio with the loss of three crew.

=== 2 September ===
List of shipwrecks: 2 September 1925
Ship	State	Description
HMCS Armentières	Royal Canadian Navy	The Battle-class trawler sank in the Pipestem Inlet, Barkley Sound. She was later salvaged, repaired and returned to service.

=== 3 September ===
List of shipwrecks: 3 September 1925
Ship	State	Description
Keren	Italy	The cargo ship ran aground at Ceuta, Spain. She was refloated on 8 September.

=== 4 September ===
List of shipwrecks: 4 September 1925
Ship	State	Description
Pennant	United Kingdom	The coaster collided with Acasta (United Kingdom) in the River Thames near Gravesend, Kent and sank with the loss of two of the fourteen people on board. Survivors were rescued by Acasta.

=== 5 September ===
List of shipwrecks: 5 September 1925
Ship	State	Description
Eldridge	United States	The cargo ship ran aground on the Ioula Ledge, Philippines. She was refloated on 10 September.

=== 8 September ===
List of shipwrecks: 8 September 1925
Ship	State	Description
Alcores	United Kingdom	The cargo ship sprang a leak and was beached at Dunfanaghy, County Londonderry. Her crew were taken off on 10 September and the ship was further damaged in a gale.
Bentem Maru No.3	Japan	The cargo ship foundered in a typhoon at Kavafuto.

=== 10 September ===
List of shipwrecks: 10 September 1925
Ship	State	Description
Kimigayo Maru	Japan	The passenger ship was driven ashore at Quelpart, Korea. All on board were rescued.

=== 14 September ===
List of shipwrecks: 14 September 1925
Ship	State	Description
Chita Maru	Japan	The cargo ship collided with Muroran Maru No.6 (Japan) off Wakamatsu and sank.

=== 15 September ===
List of shipwrecks: 15 September 1925
Ship	State	Description
Flora	Chile	The barque caught fire in the Atlantic Ocean north west of the Falkland Islands (50°17′30″S 61°42′00″W). She was taken to Comodoro Rivadavia, Argentina, where she was abandoned on 2 October.
Mavis	United Kingdom	The Thames barge was in collision with another vessel in the River Thames at Blackwall, London and sank.

=== 16 September ===
List of shipwrecks: 16 September 1925
Ship	State	Description
Alwine	Germany	The auxiliary sailing ship came ashore on Bornholm, Denmark. Her crew were rescued. She was later refloated and taken to Rønne.

=== 19 September ===
List of shipwrecks: 19 September 1925
Ship	State	Description
Surabaya Maru	Japan	The cargo ship ran aground on the Meridian Reef, Borneo. She was refloated on 22 September but stranded again.
Tomashima Maru	Japan	The cargo ship foundered in the South China Sea west of Formosa with the loss of all hands.

=== 21 September ===
List of shipwrecks: 21 September 1925
Ship	State	Description
Agdenes	Norway	The cargo ship collided with Songelv (Norway) in the North Sea off Haugesund, Norway and sank with the loss of all hands.
Benjamin A. van Brunt	United States	The four-masted schooner collided with a United States Navy warship in the Atlantic Ocean off Norfolk, Virginia and sank. Survivors were rescued by USS Milwaukee (United States Navy).
Leeds City	United Kingdom	The cargo ship struck a reef off Bawean, Netherlands East Indies and sank. Her crew were rescued.

=== 23 September ===
List of shipwrecks: 23 September 1925
Ship	State	Description
Ansaldo Terzo	Italy	The tanker ran aground at Faraman. She was refloated on 26 September.
Mercedes	Chile	The coaster foundered in the Pacific Ocean whilst on a voyage from Coronel to Valparaíso with the loss of all hands.

=== 24 September ===
List of shipwrecks: 24 September 1925
Ship	State	Description
Millais	United Kingdom	The cargo ship ran aground in the Paraná River, Argentina. She was refloated on 27 September.

=== 25 September ===
List of shipwrecks: 25 September 1925
Ship	State	Description
Ariel	United States	The 26-gross register ton motor vessel was wrecked on the west-central coast of the Territory of Alaska 14 nautical miles (26 km; 16 mi) southeast of Point Spencer (65°17′N 165°50′W). Her crew of seven survived, but she became a total loss.
Dieuze	Canada	The cargo ship was destroyed by fire at Pictou, Nova Scotia, Canada.
USS S-51	United States Navy	The minesweeper USS Falcon (United States Navy) assisting in the salvage of USS S-51. The S-class submarine was rammed accidentally by the steamer City of Rome (United States) in the Atlantic Ocean off the coast of Rhode Island 14 nautical miles (26 km; 16 mi) east of Block Island and sank immediately in 135 feet (41 m) of water with the loss of 33 members of her 36-man crew at 41°14′30″N 71°16′16″W. She was raised on 5 July 1926 and scrapped in 1930.

=== 28 September ===
List of shipwrecks: 28 September 1925
Ship	State	Description
Salmo	United States	During a voyage in the waters of the Territory of Alaska from Kenai to Seldovia and intermediate ports with six passengers, three crewmen, and a cargo of 1 1/2 tons of miscellaneous merchandise aboard, the 14-gross register ton, 36-foot (11 m) fishing vessel was destroyed in Cook Inlet at the mouth of the Kasilof River by a fire that began with a gasoline explosion aft. All on board were rescued by a watchman from a nearby cannery in a small boat.

=== 29 September ===
List of shipwrecks: 29 September 1925
Ship	State	Description
Bacicin Serra	Italy	The cargo ship sprang a leak, caught fire and foundered in the Mediterranean Sea 25 nautical miles (46 km) off Gozo, Malta. Her crew survived
Ysselstroom	Netherlands	The cargo ship struck a rock and foundered in the Atlantic Ocean off Sinoe, Liberia (4°45′N 8°44′W). Her crew were rescued by Elisabethville (Belgium).

== October ==
=== 2 October ===
List of shipwrecks: 2 October 1925
Ship	State	Description
Atala	France	The cargo ship struck rocks off La Rocque, Jersey, Channel Islands and sank. All fifteen crew survived.
Glendevon	United Kingdom	The Thames barge was in collision with a steamship in the River Thames at East Greenwich, London and sank.

=== 3 October ===
List of shipwrecks: 3 October 1925
Ship	State	Description
Inger	United States	The 7-net register ton fishing vessel caught fire in Tongass Narrows when her gasoline engine backfired and was beached on Gravina Island in the Gravina Islands of the Alexander Archipelago in Southeast Alaska when the fire went out of control. Her crew of two survived, but the fire destroyed her on the beach.
Magnetic	United Kingdom	The passenger tender was beached at Liverpool after a fire broke out on board. She was later refloated, repaired, and returned to service.

=== 4 October ===
List of shipwrecks: 4 October 1925
Ship	State	Description
Algus	flag unknown	The cargo ship came ashore at Vaasa, Finland and was wrecked with the loss of a crew member.
Jane	United Kingdom	The coaster struck the Swilley Rocks in the Menai Strait. She was refloated but subsequently foundered off Garth Point, Bangor, Caernarfonshire.
Kiyo Maru No.2	Japan	The cargo ship foundered in the East China Sea off Shakotan, Hokkaidō.
S2	Finnish Navy	The S-class torpedo boat sank during a storm in the Bothnian Sea off Reposaari, Finland, with the loss of her entire crew of 53.

=== 6 October ===
List of shipwrecks: 6 October 1925
Ship	State	Description
Ellerdale	United Kingdom	The cargo ship was beached at St. Anthony, Newfoundland.
Esperansa	Finland	The schooner came ashore at Lysefyrt, Latvia and was wrecked with the loss of two crew.

=== 8 October ===
List of shipwrecks: 8 October 1925
Ship	State	Description
Margarita	Greece	The cargo ship foundered in the Indian Ocean 20 nautical miles (37 km) off the mouth of the Great Fish River, South Africa with the loss of all hands.

=== 9 October ===
List of shipwrecks: 9 October 1925
Ship	State	Description
Normann II	United Kingdom	The whaler foundered in the Caribbean Sea 10 nautical miles (19 km) off Saint Lucia. Her crew survived.
Undine	Germany	The auxiliary sailing ship capsized in the Baltic Sea off Memel, East Prussia. Her crew survived.

=== 10 October ===
List of shipwrecks: 10 October 1925
Ship	State	Description
Pizzaro	United Kingdom	The cargo ship caught fire and capsized at Liverpool, Lancashire. She was refloated on 25 October.

=== 13 October ===
List of shipwrecks: 13 October 1925
Ship	State	Description
Cochinchine	France	The concrete ship sprang a leak and sank at Saigon, French Indochina.

=== 14 October ===
List of shipwrecks: 14 October 1925
Ship	State	Description
Emily	United Kingdom	The schooner was abandoned in the Atlantic Ocean off Bermuda. Her crew were rescued by Capsa (United Kingdom).
Songelv	Norway	The cargo ship was beached at Rørvik, Norway. She was refloated on 17 October.

=== 15 October ===
List of shipwrecks: 15 October 1925
Ship	State	Description
Derville	United Kingdom	The coaster departed St. Anthony, Newfoundland for Málaga, Spain. No further trace, presumed foundered in the Atlantic Ocean with the loss of all hands.
Eemdijk	Netherlands	The cargo liner ran aground on the Race Rocks in the Strait of Juan de Fuca. She was refloated and beached on Bentinck Island, British Columbia, Canada. She was refloated on 19 October.
Flora	Chile	The barque was shelled and sunk in the Atlantic Ocean (45°15′S 66°15′W) by Patria (Argentine Navy).

=== 16 October ===
List of shipwrecks: 16 October 1925
Ship	State	Description
Blokshiv No. 1	Imperial Russian Navy	The ironclad, used as a storeship, was driven ashore at Kronstadt. She was refloated in 1927, repaired and returned to service.
Sliny	Soviet Navy	The destroyer was driven ashore at Kronstadt. She was scrapped in December.
Ussuriets	Soviet Navy	The Vsadnik-class destroyer was driven ashore and wrecked at Kronstadt.

=== 18 October ===
List of shipwrecks: 18 October 1925
Ship	State	Description
Comanche	United States	The ocean liner caught fire in the Atlantic Ocean 6 nautical miles (11 km) off Mayport, Florida with the loss of ten of the 166 people on board. Survivors were rescued by the tanker Reaper and the pilot boat Mota (both United States). She was towed into Jacksonville, where she was beached in an extensively damaged condition, a total loss.

=== 19 October ===
List of shipwrecks: 19 October 1925
Ship	State	Description
Bito	United Kingdom	The cargo ship ran aground in the Paraná River, Argentina. She was refloated on 26 October.
Portgwarra	United Kingdom	The cargo ship ran aground in the Paraná River. She was refloated on 29 October.
Stockwell	United Kingdom	The cargo ship caught fire at Oran, Algeria and was scuttled. She was refloated on 24 October.

=== 21 October ===
List of shipwrecks: 21 October 1925
Ship	State	Description
Evald	Sweden	The 100.4-foot (30.6 m), 155-ton steam trawler was sunk in collision near the Skaw with the barque Plus (Finland).
Ignazio Florio	Italy	The cargo ship suffered a failure of her steering gear and was abandoned in the Atlantic Ocean (49°50′N 37°46′W). Her crew were rescued by President Harding (United States).

=== 22 October ===
List of shipwrecks: 22 October 1925
Ship	State	Description
Bordelaise	France	The schooner sprang a leak in the North Sea and sank. Her crew were rescued by the trawler Tonno (Italy).
Rosalie Hull	United States	The four-masted schooner came ashore at Key West, Florida and was wrecked. Her crew were rescued.

=== 23 October ===
List of shipwrecks: 23 October 1925
Ship	State	Description
Ibuki Maru	Japan	The cargo ship ran aground at Nemuro, Hokkaidō. She broke in two on 26 October and was a total loss.

=== 24 October ===
List of shipwrecks: 24 October 1925
Ship	State	Description
Nancy Lee	Dominion of Newfoundland	The schooner sprang a leak and was abandoned in the Atlantic Ocean (48°12′N 32°51′W). Her crew were rescued by Ben Vorlich (United Kingdom).
Shonga	United Kingdom	The cargo ship ran aground in the Cawthorne Channel, Bonny, Nigeria. She was refloated on 28 October.

=== 26 October ===
List of shipwrecks: 26 October 1925
Ship	State	Description
Alma Guy	United Kingdom	The schooner came ashore at Bonavista, Dominion of Newfoundland and was wrecked.
Apollon	France	The cargo ship caught fire at Beirut, Lebanon. She was shelled and sunk as she was carrying dynamite and petrol. Her crew survived.
Elven	Norway	The cargo ship suffered a failure of her steering gear in the Atlantic Ocean. She was consequently abandoned 49°20′N 41°00′W). Her crew were rescued by American Trader (United States).
Galtymore	United Kingdom	The cargo ship ran aground at Philadelphia, Pennsylvania. She was refloated on 29 October.
Havelland	Germany	The cargo ship ran aground at Yokohama, Japan. She was refloated on 30 October.
J. C. May	United Kingdom	The schooner was driven ashore on Codroy Island, Newfoundland and was wrecked.
Mabel and Carrie	United Kingdom	The schooner was driven ashore at Fermeuse, Newfoundland and was wrecked.
Moon	United Kingdom	The cargo ship struck the quayside at Sydney, Nova Scotia, Canada and was beached.

=== 27 October ===
List of shipwrecks: 27 October 1925
Ship	State	Description
Maria	Germany	The cargo ship came ashore at Skælskør, Zealand, Denmark and was wrecked.

=== 28 October ===
List of shipwrecks: 28 October 1925
Ship	State	Description
Hubert Mack	United Kingdom	The schooner came ashore at Fortune, Dominion of Newfoundland and was wrecked.

=== 30 October ===
List of shipwrecks: 30 October 1925
Ship	State	Description
Hamburg	Germany	The barque ran aground in the Irish Sea off Dún Laoghaire, County Dublin, Ireland. Her crew were rescued. She was refloated on 20 November.
Paul	Germany	The schooner ran aground in Carmarthen Bay and was wrecked. All seventeen people on board were rescued.

=== Unknown date ===
List of shipwrecks: Unknown date October 1925
Ship	State	Description
USS R-8	United States Navy	The R-class submarine collided with the minesweeper USS Widgeon (United States Navy), losing her periscopes and suffering the destruction of her bridge and damage to her radio antenna supports. She was repaired and returned to service.

== November ==
=== 1 November ===
List of shipwrecks: 1 November 1925
Ship	State	Description
Cairnavon	United Kingdom	The cargo shpip ran aground off Buchan Ness, Boddam, Aberdeenshire. She broke her back and was a total loss. All 48 crew were rescued.
Eva	Denmark	The schooner foundered in the Atlantic Ocean. Her crew were rescued by Idaho (United Kingdom).
Kingsdon	United Kingdom	The cargo ship caught fire at Oran. Algeria and was beached. She was refloated the next day.

=== 2 November ===
List of shipwrecks: 2 November 1925
Ship	State	Description
Württemberg	Germany	The ocean liner ran aground in the Río Grande do Sul, Brazil. She was refloated on 6 November.

=== 3 November ===
List of shipwrecks: 3 November 1925
Ship	State	Description
Algiers	United States	The cargo ship sprang a leak, caught fire and was abandoned in the Atlantic Ocean (37°35′N 69°23′W) whilst under tow from the United States to Italy for scrapping.

=== 5 November ===
List of shipwrecks: 5 November 1925
Ship	State	Description
J. L. Crane	United States	The barge sank in a gale and heavy seas when she lost her towline while towed by Herman H. Hettler (United States) near Crisp Point in Lake Superior. Lost with all seven hands.
Paul	Germany	Paul The sailing ship was driven ashore and wrecked at Cefn Sidan, Carmarthenshire, United Kingdom.

=== 6 November ===
List of shipwrecks: 6 November 1925
Ship	State	Description
Irena	United Kingdom	The coaster departed Granville, Manche, France for Liverpool, Lancashire. No further trace, presumed to have foundered with the loss of all hands.

=== 9 November ===
List of shipwrecks: 9 November 1925
Ship	State	Description
Merwede	Netherlands	The cargo ship ran aground at Gravelines, Nord, France. She was refloated on 13 November.
Virginia	United States	The four-masted schooner came ashore at Arecibo, Puerto Rico. Her crew were rescued.

=== 11 November ===
List of shipwrecks: 11 November 1925
Ship	State	Description
Carmello Polizzi	Italy	The cargo ship sprang a leak and was beached at Vigo, Galicia, Spain.
Ruth	Denmark	The cargo ship sprang a leak and was beached at Skagen. She was refloated on 21 November.

=== 12 November ===
List of shipwrecks: 12 November 1925
Ship	State	Description
Hedge Fence Light Vessel	United States Coast Guard	The lightship was rammed and sunk off the coast of Massachusetts by M. C. Holm (Denmark).
HMS M1	Royal Navy	The M-class submarine collided with Vidar (Sweden) in the English Channel (49°59′N 3°56′W) and sank with the loss of all 69 crew.

=== 15 November ===
List of shipwrecks: 15 November 1925
Ship	State	Description
Anna O'Conner	United States	The canal barge, towed by Barryton (United States), broke loose in a gale and was wrecked on the breakwater at Buffalo, New York. Three barges were wrecked in total, with four crew were killed between them.
Concordia	Denmark	The schooner ran aground in Liverpool Bay and was abandoned. Her crew were rescued by the Crosby Lightship (United Kingdom): She was refloated the next day and beached at Tranmere, Cheshire severely damaged.
Jerry B. Petrie	United States	The canal barge, towed by Barryton (United States), broke loose in a gale and was wrecked on the breakwater at Buffalo, New York. Between three barges wrecked, four crew were killed.
Sherman V. Petrie	United States	The canal barge, towed by Barryton (United States), broke loose in a gale and was wrecked on the breakwater at Buffalo, New York. Between three barges wrecked, four crew were killed.

=== 16 November ===
List of shipwrecks: 16 November 1925
Ship	State	Description
USCGC CG-114	United States Coast Guard	The cutter was sunk in collision with a United States Navy vessel off Atlantic City, New Jersey.
Fernando	United Kingdom	The cargo ship ran aground on Guardiani, Greece. She was refloated on 20 November.
Obotrita	Germany	Original caption: Obotrite ashore at Ostende. Three masted barque on the sands before breaking up; spectators on the beach. The barque was driven ashore at Ostend, West Flanders, Belgium and was subsequently wrecked.
Veidirjalla	Iceland	The auxiliary sailing vessel was wrecked on the south coast of Iceland.

=== 17 November ===
List of shipwrecks: 17 November 1925
Ship	State	Description
Don Jose	United States	The cargo ship came ashore at Bitokakku, near Keelung, Formosa and was wrecked. Her crew were rescued.
Marathon	United States	The 25-gross register ton motor vessel was wrecked at Kodiak, Territory of Alaska, when she dragged her anchor during a gale. Her crew of two survived.
Pleiades	United Kingdom	The schooner came ashore on Belldowns Island, Newfoundland and was wrecked.

=== 18 November ===
List of shipwrecks: 18 November 1925
Ship	State	Description
Clan Mackay	United Kingdom	The cargo ship caught fire at Tilbury, Essex. She was a constructive total loss.
Lenape	United States	The passenger/cargo ship caught fire off the Delaware Capes, beached in Delaware Bay. The vessel was later scrapped. All passengers and crew were rescued. She was a total loss.

=== 19 November ===
List of shipwrecks: 19 November 1925
Ship	State	Description
Beulah Mae	United Kingdom	The schooner came ashore at Burnt Point, Newfoundland and was abandoned. She refloated and drifted out to sea.
Groix	France	The cargo ship collided with Yorkshire (United Kingdom) in the Elbe and was beached.
Mabel E. Gunn	United Kingdom	The schooner was destroyed by fire at a port in the Turks Islands.
Ryuho Maru	Japan	The cargo ship collided with an Imperial Japanese Navy destroyer at Shimonoseki, Japan, and sank.

=== 20 November ===
List of shipwrecks: 20 November 1925
Ship	State	Description
Ernest Hugo Stinnes II	Germany	The cargo ship ran aground on Långholmen, Sweden and was a total loss.
Wagrien	Danzig	The cargo ship ran aground at Simrishamn, Skåne County, Sweden. She was refloated on 23 November.
Yoshinoyama Maru	Japan	The cargo ship struck a rock off Wanaki and was beached.

=== 21 November ===
List of shipwrecks: 21 November 1925
Ship	State	Description
Horace M. Bickford	United States	The schooner foundered in the Gulf of Mexico (25°23′N 85°20′W). Her crew were rescued by Olean (United States).
Rio Sella	Spain	The auxiliary schooner sank at Pontevedra, Galicia.

=== 22 November ===
List of shipwrecks: 22 November 1925
Ship	State	Description
Santa Teresina	Italy	The cargo ship foundered in the Adriatic Sea. Her crew were rescued by Levnet (United Kingdom).
Wakanoura Maru	Japan	The cargo ship collided with Meiko Maru (Japan) during a typhoon at Kushiro and was beached. She was refloated on 29 November.

=== 23 November ===
List of shipwrecks: 23 November 1925
Ship	State	Description
Adriana	Chile	The cargo ship came ashore at Caniçal, Madeira, Portugal and was wrecked.
Lapwing	United Kingdom	The coaster sank at Dunoon, Argyllshire.

=== 24 November ===
List of shipwrecks: 24 November 1925
Ship	State	Description
Galleon	United Kingdom	The coaster departed Blyth, Northumberland for London. Presumed foundered in the North Sea with the loss of all hands.

=== 25 November ===
List of shipwrecks: 25 November 1925
Ship	State	Description
Mahone	United Kingdom	The cargo ship came ashore at Codroy, Newfoundland. She was declared a total loss on 2 December.
Santon	United Kingdom	The sailing ship came ashore at Donna Nook, Lincolnshire. Her crew were rescued.
Whinstone	United Kingdom	The cargo ship came ashore at Donna Nook. She refloated but subsequently foundered off Saltfleet, Lincolnshire.

=== 26 November ===
List of shipwrecks: 26 November 1925
Ship	State	Description
Cornelis	Netherlands	The tug was driven ashore at Delfzijl, Groningen. Her crew were rescued.
Ellen Larsen	Germany	The cargo ship was driven ashore on Terschelling, Netherlands. Her crew were rescued. She was refloated on 9 December.

=== 27 November ===
List of shipwrecks: 27 November 1925
Ship	State	Description
La Palma	Spain	The cargo ship ran aground at Arrecife, Canary Islands. She was refloated on 14 December.
Sutton	United Kingdom	The coaster departed Aberystwyth, Cardiganshire for Antwerp, Belgium. Believed foundered in Cardigan Bay with the loss of all hands. Wreckage from the ship washed up at Penbryn on 1 December.
Valsesia	Italy	The cargo ship ran aground in the Paraná River, at Point Indio, Argentina. She was refloated on 22 December.

=== 28 November ===
List of shipwrecks: 28 November 1925
Ship	State	Description
Competitor	United Kingdom	The cargo ship issued an SOS in the Indian Ocean 75 nautical miles (139 km) south west of Algoa Bay, South Africa. Believed foundered with the loss of all hands.

=== 29 November ===
List of shipwrecks: 29 November 1925
Ship	State	Description
John C. Meyer	United States	The four-masted barquentine came ashore on Libby Island, Maine and was wrecked.
Vestland	Denmark	The auxiliary three-masted schooner ran aground off Zoutelande, Netherlands with the loss of a crew member.

=== 30 November ===
List of shipwrecks: 30 November 1925
Ship	State	Description
Marionga Mari	Greece	The cargo ship ran aground at Piraeus. She was refloated on 8 December.

=== Unknown date ===
List of shipwrecks: Unknown date November 1925
Ship	State	Description
Cameronia	United Kingdom	The ocean liner collided with the steamer Hauk (Norway).

== December ==
=== 1 December ===
List of shipwrecks: 1 December 1925
Ship	State	Description
Alexander	United States	The 13-gross register ton vessel was wrecked in a storm at Seldovia, Territory of Alaska. Her two crewmen survived.
Cotopaxi	United States	The cargo ship issued a distress signal whilst on a voyage from Charleston, South Carolina to Havana, Cuba. Believed to have foundered on this date with the loss of all 32 crew. In 1985 an unknown shipwreck was found off St Augustine, Florida; in 2020 it was identified as the remains of the SS Cotopaxi
Marion N. Cobb	United States	The schooner was abandoned in the Gulf of Mexico at approximately 29°N 87°W. Her crew were rescued by the fishing vessel Mary A. Gleason (United States).

=== 3 December ===
List of shipwrecks: 3 December 1925
Ship	State	Description
Dimitrios Nomicos	Greece	The coaster foundered in the Tyrrhenian Sea off Vulcano, Italy.
Halco	United States	The coaster came ashore at Aberdeen, Washington and was wrecked.

=== 4 December ===
List of shipwrecks: 4 December 1925
Ship	State	Description
Delhi	United Kingdom	The brig was dismasted and sprang a leak in the Andaman Sea and was abandoned. Her crew were rescued by Masirah (United Kingdom).
Gwalia	United States	The tugboat sprang a leak during a storm and sank in the Gulf of Mexico 85 miles (137 km) northwest of mouth of Tampa Bay, Florida.

=== 5 December ===
List of shipwrecks: 5 December 1925
Ship	State	Description
Sebb	United Kingdom	The coaster sank at Lagavulin, Islay.

=== 6 December ===
List of shipwrecks: 6 December 1925
Ship	State	Description
Ashton	United Kingdom	The coaster was rammed and sunk by Federal (United States) in the Scheldt with the loss of four of the ten people on board.
Chatton	United Kingdom	The cargo ship ran aground in the Paraná River, Argentina. She was refloated on 15 December.
Mary Watkinson	United Kingdom	The three-masted schooner came ashore south of Flamborough Head, Yorkshire. Her crew were rescued by the Bridlington Lifeboat. She was refloated on 15 December.

=== 7 December ===
List of shipwrecks: 7 December 1925
Ship	State	Description
Airedale	United Kingdom	The cargo ship ran aground in the Saint Lawrence River, Quebec, Canada. She was refloated on 14 December.
Palatino	Italy	The cargo ship ran aground in the Adriatic Sea whilst on a voyage from Mali Lošinj to Zadar, Yugoslavia. She was refloated on 15 December.

=== 8 December ===
List of shipwrecks: 8 December 1925
Ship	State	Description
Montclair	United States	The 23-ton motor vessel dragged her anchor during a gale and was wrecked on the beach in a cove on the south shore of Etolin Island in the Alexander Archipelago in Southeast Alaska. Her crew of three survived.

=== 9 December ===
List of shipwrecks: 9 December 1925
Ship	State	Description
Belgium Maru	Japan	The passenger/cargo ship ran aground at the entrance to Samana Bay, Dominican Republic. She was refloated on 12 December without damage.
Ben Blanche	Isle of Man	The coaster was holed and consequently beached at Derbyhaven.
Mercur	Finland	The auxiliary schooner came ashore at Husby, Norway and was wrecked.

=== 10 December ===
List of shipwrecks: 10 December 1925
Ship	State	Description
Araya Mendi	Spain	The cargo ship ran aground and sank off Ceuta.
Bevero	Norway	The cargo ship sank in Grønsund, Denmark.

=== 11 December ===
List of shipwrecks: 11 December 1925
Ship	State	Description
Dora	Germany	The cargo ship ran aground 40 nautical miles (74 km) north of Gothenburg, Sweden. Her crew were rescued.
Headlight	United Kingdom	The cargo ship arrived at Larne, County Antrim with a fire in her cargo and was beached. She was refloated later that day.
Pamir	United States	The tanker was abandoned in the Caribbean Sea with the loss of nine crew. She was subsequently discovered derelict 17 nautical miles (31 km) north west of Maracaibo, Venezuela. Pamir later came ashore on San Carlos Island. She was declared a total loss.

=== 12 December ===
List of shipwrecks: 12 December 1925
Ship	State	Description
Emilia	Italy	The sailing ship collided with Texas Maru (Japan) in the Mediterranean Sea (44°04′N 9°25′E) and sank with the loss of two crew.
Thomas Fooks	United Kingdom	The cargo ship ran aground in the Bosporus and was a constructive total loss.

=== 13 December ===
List of shipwrecks: 13 December 1925
Ship	State	Description
Berta	Sweden	The cargo ship was destroyed by fire at Styrso.
Desirade	France	The passenger ship ran aground in the Paraná River, Argentina. Her passengers were taken off. She was refloated the next day.
Vedette	Honduras	The passenger ship ran aground at Cape Engaño, Dominican Republic. She was a total loss. Some of her 825 passengers were landed, others were transferred to Belgium Maru (Japan).

=== 14 December ===
List of shipwrecks: 14 December 1925
Ship	State	Description
Lushby	United Kingdom	The 133.9-foot (40.8 m), 275-ton steam trawler, a former Castle-class naval trawler, was wrecked on the south side of Tory Island, County Donegal, Ireland.

=== 15 December ===
List of shipwrecks: 15 December 1925
Ship	State	Description
USS Curlew	United States Navy	The Lapwing-class minesweeper ran aground at Point Mosquito, Panama and was wrecked.

=== 16 December ===
List of shipwrecks: 16 December 1925
Ship	State	Description
Miyo Maru	Japan	The coaster came ashore at Hakodate and was wrecked.

=== 17 December ===
List of shipwrecks: 17 December 1925
Ship	State	Description
Harparkes	United Kingdom	The coaster struck rocks off "Gorsegain" and was beached.
Inga Kunstmann	Germany	The coaster collided with Rhodesia (Denmark) at Kiel, Schleswig-Holstein and sank. Her crew were rescued.

=== 18 December ===
List of shipwrecks: 18 December 1925
Ship	State	Description
Archangelos	Greece	The cargo ship collided with Danubian (United Kingdom) in the Danube at Galaţi, Romania and ran aground. She was refloated on 20 December.
Busen VII	Norway	The whaler ran aground on the Melenara Reef, off the Canary Islands and was wrecked.
John Morrison	United Kingdom	The barquentine sprang a leak and was abandoned off Wicklow Head, Ireland.

=== 19 December ===
List of shipwrecks: 19 December 1925
Ship	State	Description
Lushby	United Kingdom	The sold off Castle class trawler stranded at Tory Island, County Donegal, Ireland and was lost.

=== 20 December ===
List of shipwrecks: 20 December 1925
Ship	State	Description
Amble	United Kingdom	The cargo ship came ashore at Alnmouth, Northumberland. She was refloated on 30 December and beached.
Marina	Italy	The cargo ship sprang a leak and was abandoned in the Atlantic Ocean (39°35′N 36°20′W). Seventeen of her 35 crew were rescued by C.I.P. (France).
Wearsider	United Kingdom	The cargo ship foundered in the North Sea 7 nautical miles (13 km) east of Coquet Island, Northumberland.

=== 21 December ===
List of shipwrecks: 21 December 1925
Ship	State	Description
Ataka Maru	Japan	The cargo ship ran aground on Russky Island, Soviet Union. She was expected to remain ashore for several months.
Chiyoda Maru	Japan	The cargo ship foundered off Hakodate with the loss of all but one of her crew.

=== 22 December ===
List of shipwrecks: 22 December 1925
Ship	State	Description
Lily	Finland	The cargo ship ran aground on Öland, Sweden. She was refloated on 27 December but sank the next day whilst under tow. Her crew were rescued.

=== 23 December ===
List of shipwrecks: 23 December 1925
Ship	State	Description
Masaki Maru	Japan	The cargo ship foundered off Hakodate.
Tomifuku Maru	Japan	The cargo ship foundered off Hakodate.

=== 24 December ===
List of shipwrecks: 24 December 1925
Ship	State	Description
Arthur D. Storet	United Kingdom	The schooner was driven ashore at Greenspond, Newfoundland and was wrecked.

=== 25 December ===
List of shipwrecks: 25 December 1925
Ship	State	Description
Fortune	France	The tug was abandoned in the Indian Ocean (approximately 17°S 152°W).

=== 27 December ===
List of shipwrecks: 27 December 1925
Ship	State	Description
Cowichan	United Kingdom	The passenger ship collided with Lady Cynthia (United Kingdom) off the coast of British Columbia, Canada and sank. All 45 people on board were rescued by Lady Cynthia.
Edward J. Lawrence	United States	The retired 320-foot (98 m), 3,350-gross register ton six-masted schooner burned and sank in 10 feet (3.0 m) of water in the harbor at Portland, Maine, between Diamond Island and Fort Gorges at 43°40′08″N 070°13′08″W.

=== 28 December ===
List of shipwrecks: 28 December 1925
Ship	State	Description
Oceana	Hungary	The cargo ship collided with Rinda (Norway) in the Scheldt and was beached. She was later refloated.

=== 29 December ===
List of shipwrecks: 29 December 1925
Ship	State	Description
Harriet	United Kingdom	The schooner came ashore at Esposende, Portugal and was wrecked with the loss of one of her five crew.
Tyne Maru	Japan	The cargo ship collided with Harada Maru (Japan) off Shimonoseki and was beached.

=== 30 December ===
List of shipwrecks: 30 December 1925
Ship	State	Description
Covadonga	Spain	The cargo ship foundered at Gijón.

=== 31 December ===
List of shipwrecks: 31 December 1925
Ship	State	Description
Atlantic	United States	The four-masted schooner came ashore at Guárico Point, Cuba. Her crew were rescued.
Lady McCullum	United Kingdom	The passenger ship struck a rock and foundered in the Indian Ocean off Poolavi Point, Ceylon with the loss of four lives.

=== Unknown date ===
List of shipwrecks: Unknown date 1925
Ship	State	Description
Poseidon	Germany	The cargo ship foundered in the Baltic Sea off Gotland, Sweden. All fourteen crew were rescued by three people drowned whilst attempting the rescued.
Trieux	France	The schooner was abandoned in the Atlantic Ocean off Porto, Portugal. Her seven crew were rescued by Nestlea (United Kingdom) and landed at Falmouth, Cornwall on 26 December.

== Unknown date ==
List of shipwrecks: Unknown date 1925
Ship	State	Description
Berg No. 1	United States	The barge reportedly was wrecked at Cape Saint Elias on the south-central coast of the Territory of Alaska sometime in 1925, but the report may be in error and actually refer to a scow of the same name lost there in May 1935.
Celtic	United Kingdom	The ocean liner collided with the vessel Hampshire Coast (United Kingdom) in the Mersey in England.
Columbus	United States	The 44-ton barge was wrecked and sank on the Yukon River in the Territory of Alaska.
Creteforest	United Kingdom	The 180-foot (55 m) concrete barge was scuttled in the North Sea off Blyth.
Croix	France	The cargo ship foundered in the North Sea off Hook of Holland, the Netherlands. A box containing the ship's papers washed up at Havre des Pas on Jersey in the Channel Islands in May.
James B. Wood	United States	The schooner became a total loss at Teller, Territory of Alaska.
USFS Merganser	United States Bureau of Fisheries	The fishery patrol boat ran aground on Unimak Island in the Aleutian Islands without loss of life. She was discovered 10 days later by the cutter USCGC Haida ( United States Coast Guard), which pulled her free. She had suffered only minor damage.
