= 1925 Atlantic hurricane season =

- Season summary map

Seasonal boundaries
- First system formed: August 18, 1925
- Last system dissipated: December 1, 1925

Strongest storm
- Name: One
  - Maximum winds: 80 mph (130 km/h) (1-minute sustained)
  - Lowest pressure: 994 mbar (hPa; 29.35 inHg)

Seasonal statistics
- Total depressions: 5
- Total storms: 4
- Hurricanes: 1
- Total fatalities: ≥59 total
- Total damage: At least $1.6 million (1925 USD)

Related articles
- 1925 Pacific hurricane season; 1920-1937 Pacific typhoon seasons; 1920s North Indian Ocean cyclone seasons

The 1925 Atlantic hurricane season was the second least active Atlantic hurricane season on record in terms of accumulated cyclone energy. The season featured four tropical cyclones forming. Only one of them was a hurricane. The first storm developed on August 18, and the last dissipated on December 1. The season began at a late date, more than two months after the season began. The official start of the season is generally considered to be June 1 with the end being October 31; however, the final storm of the season formed nearly a month after the official end. Due to increased activity over the following decades, the official end of the hurricane season was shifted to November 30.

The final two storms of the season impacted several areas, with the final storm affecting areas from Cuba to Rhode Island. The third storm caused little or no damage along the Texas coastline with gale-force winds being recorded only along the coast. The last storm caused severe damage along the beaches of the Florida Peninsula, with damages estimated in the millions along with four fatalities near Tampa. At least $600,000 was lost in damages dealt to the citrus industry and several maritime incidents resulted in over 55 fatalities.

The season's activity was reflected with an accumulated cyclone energy (ACE) rating of 7, one of the lowest totals ever and far below the 1921–1930 average of 76.6. ACE is a metric used to express the energy used by a tropical cyclone during its lifetime. Therefore, a storm with a longer duration will have high values of ACE. It is only calculated at six-hour increments in which specific tropical and subtropical systems are either at or above sustained wind speeds of 39 mph (63 km/h), which is the threshold for tropical storm intensity. Thus, tropical depressions are not included here.

== Systems ==
=== Hurricane One ===
- Category 1 hurricane (SSHWS)
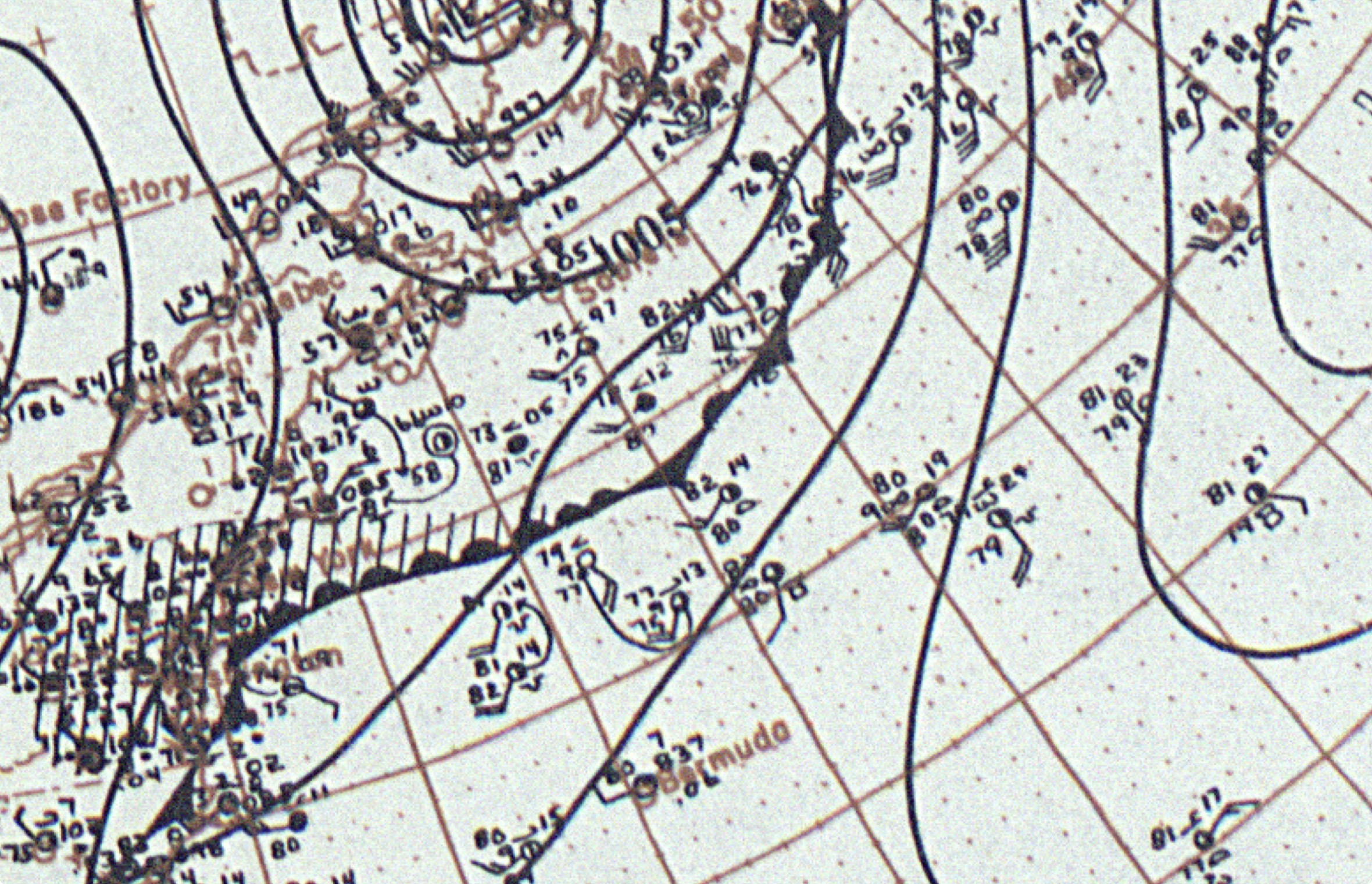
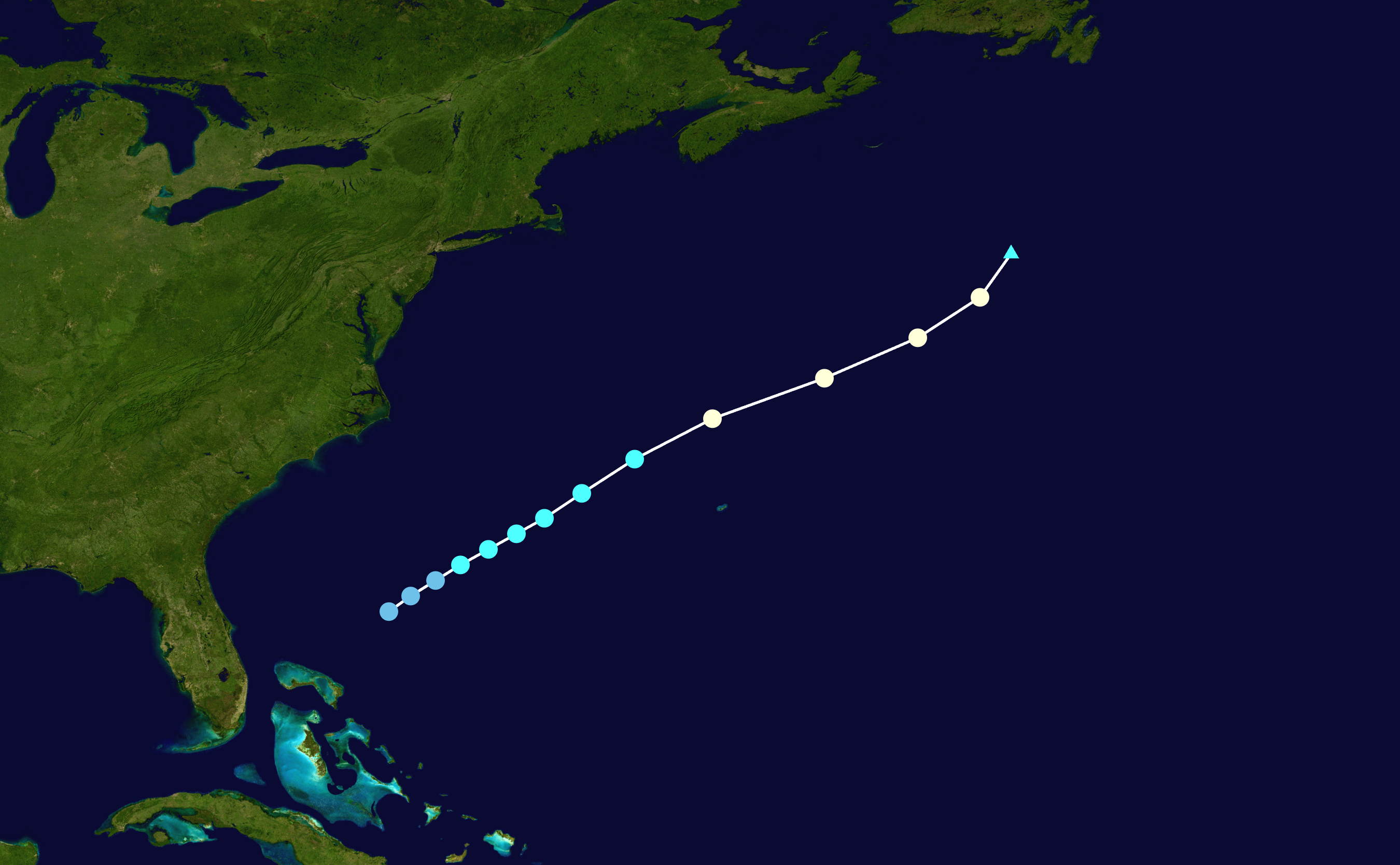
- Duration: August 18 – August 21
- Peak intensity: 80 mph (130 km/h) (1-min); <994 mbar (hPa)

The first indications of a tropical cyclone developing were on August 17. A ship in the vicinity of the developing system reported winds of 40 mph (64 km/h) over 78 °F (26 °C) waters. Around 0000 UTC the next day, the system was classified as a modern-day tropical depression with sustained winds estimated at 30 mph (48 km/h). Roughly 18 hours later, the depression strengthened into a tropical storm, the first of the season while located to the north-northeast of the Bahamas. Gradual intensification took place throughout most of the storm's life as it traveled towards the northeast until becoming a hurricane around 0600 UTC on August 20. About 30 minutes later, a ship recorded winds of 45 mph (72 km/h) and a pressure of 993.6 mbar (hPa), the lowest pressure recorded in relation to the small storm. Shortly after, the storm reached its peak intensity with winds of 80 mph (130 km/h). Increasing in forward motion, the storm became extratropical early on August 21 after turning towards the north.

=== Tropical Storm Two ===
- Tropical storm (SSHWS)
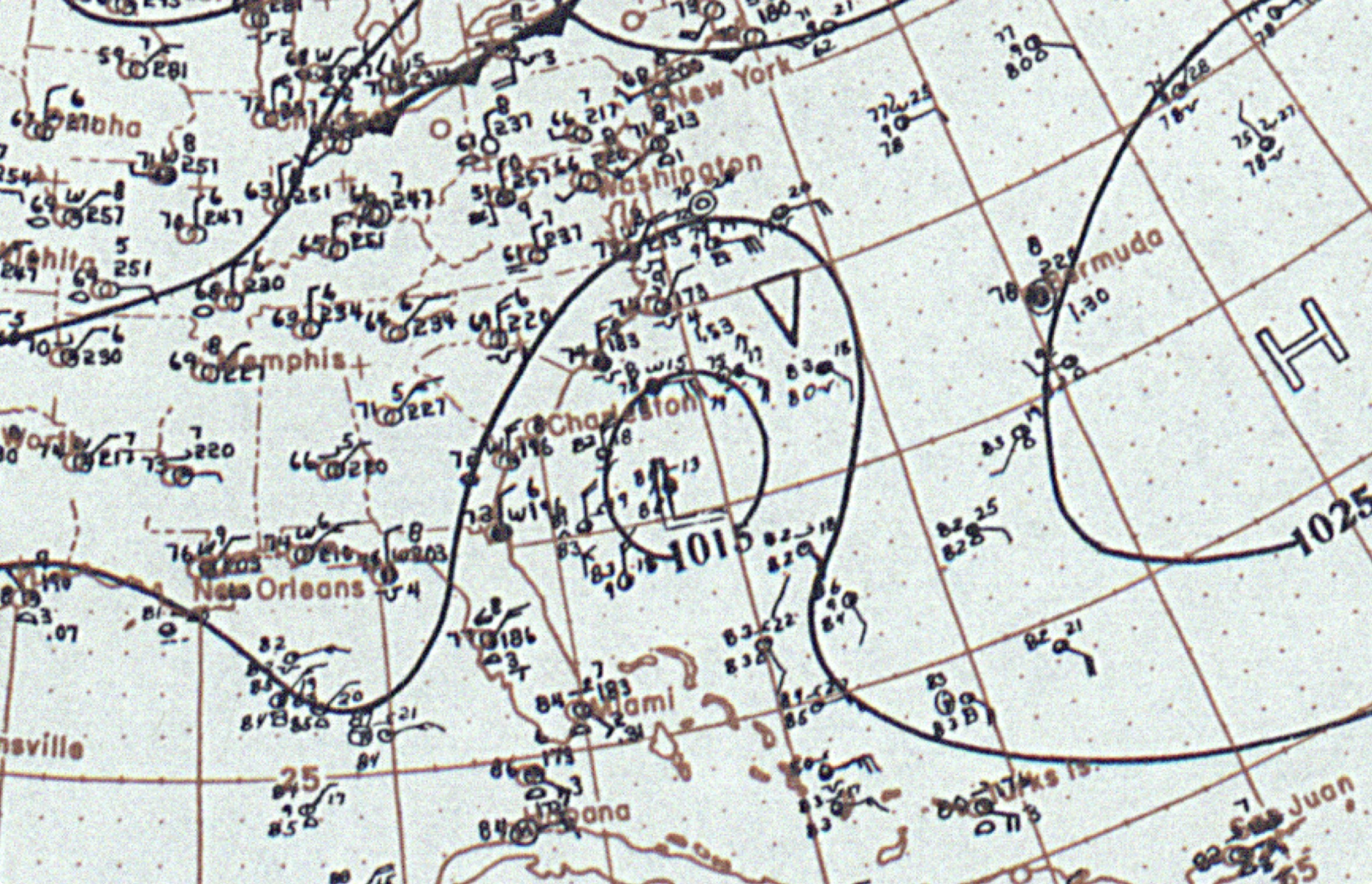
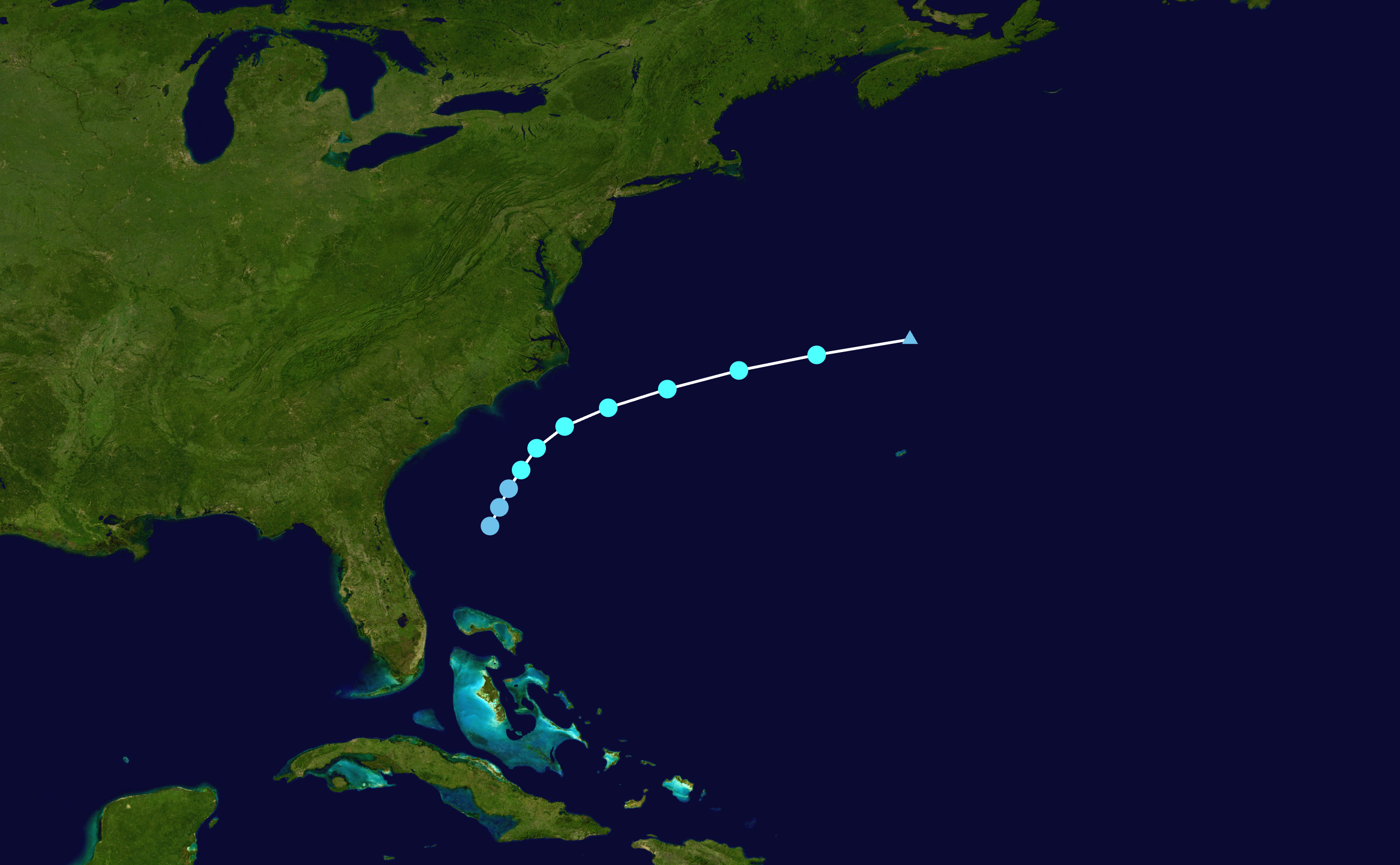
- Duration: August 25 – August 27
- Peak intensity: 40 mph (65 km/h) (1-min); <1009 mbar (hPa)

The second storm of the season was first identified on August 25 to the east of Florida as a tropical depression. Around this time, several ships were reporting winds up to 25 mph (40 km/h) in the vicinity of the system. Traveling towards the northeast, the storm gradually intensified, attainting tropical storm status around 0600 UTC the next day. Several hours later, a ship recorded a pressure of 1010 mbar (hPa) while located in the vicinity of the system. The storm turned towards the west-northwest later that day and forward motion began to increase.

Early on August 27, the storm weakened below tropical storm status and transitioned into an extratropical cyclone while moving over cooler waters. The system dissipated shortly after over open waters. Although the storm remained over water for the duration of its existence, the outer reaches of the system brought rain and light winds to Georgia, Florida, and the Carolinas. In Jacksonville, Florida, the storm produced 0.47 in (12 mm) of rain on August 25. Between August 26 and 27, Cape Hatteras received 2.06 in (52 mm) of rain from the storm.

=== Tropical Storm Three ===
- Tropical storm (SSHWS)
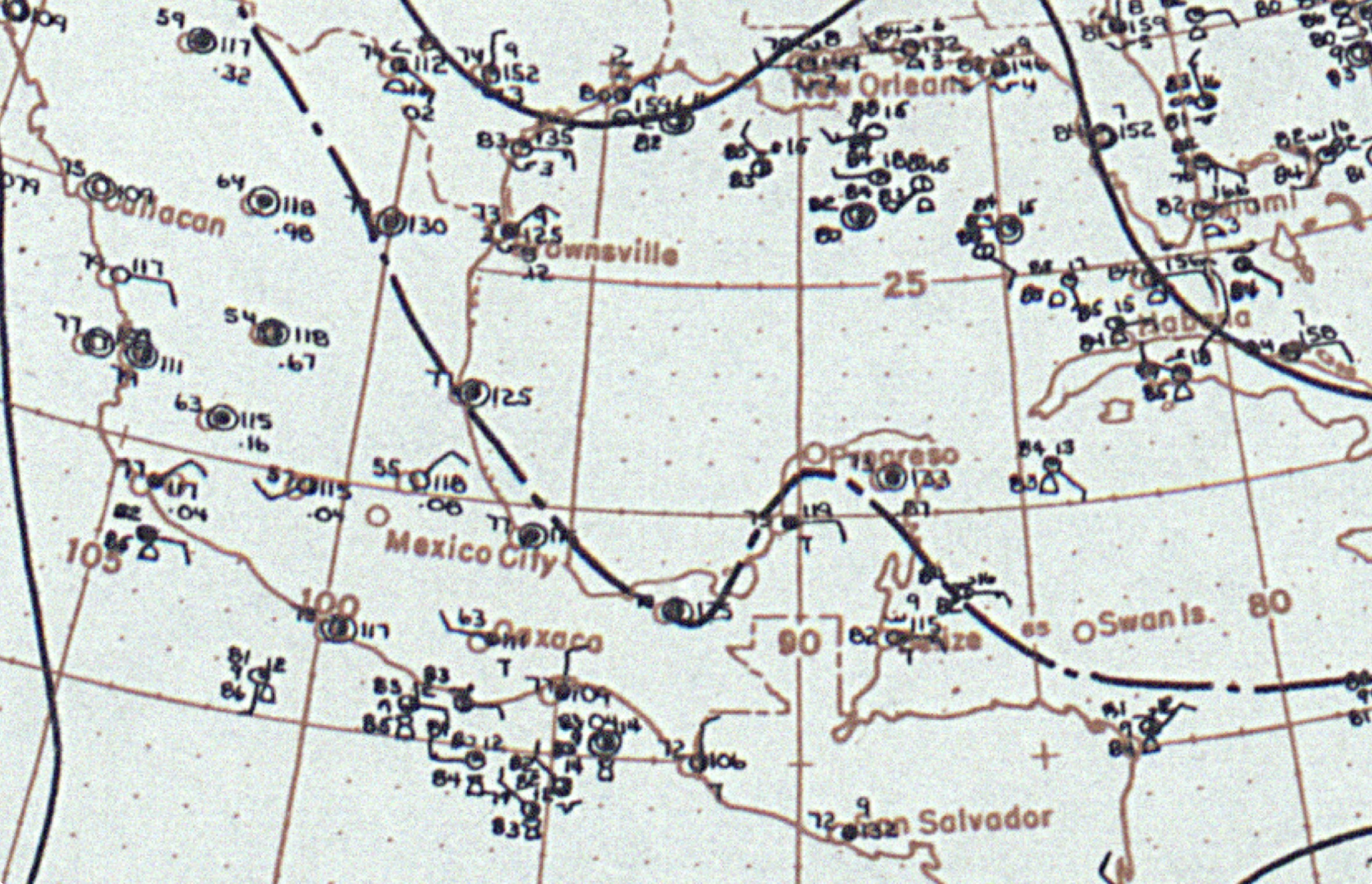
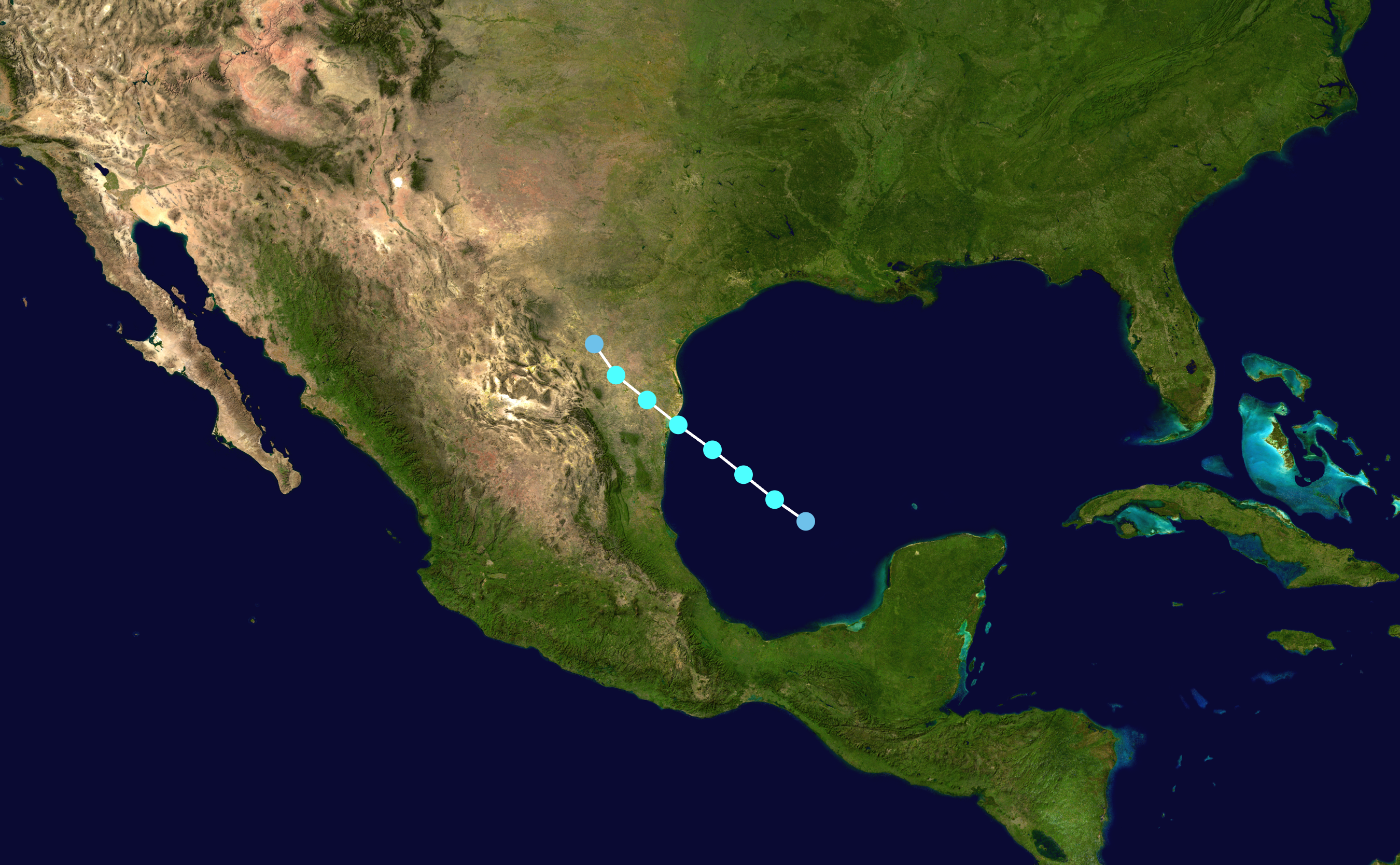
- Duration: September 6 – September 7
- Peak intensity: 50 mph (85 km/h) (1-min); <1002 mbar (hPa)

The third storm of the season was first identified as tropical depression off the northwestern coast of the Yucatan Peninsula early on September 6. The system moved at a steady pace to the northwest towards the Rio Grande Valley. Shortly after forming, the depression strengthened into a tropical storm. At this time, a ship in the vicinity of the storm recorded a pressure of 1012 mbar (hPa). By 1800 UTC that day, the storm reached its peak intensity with winds of 50 mph (80 km/h). Around 9 pm CST (0300 UTC on September 7) that night, storm warnings were issued for areas between Brownsville and Corpus Christi, Texas. These warnings were later expanded to include the entire Texas coastline.

The storm made landfall in northern Mexico, just south of the Texas border, shortly after the warnings were extended. Around the time the storm made landfall, a pressure of 1002 mbar (hPa) was recorded in Brownsville, Texas. The storm dissipated later that day over southwestern Texas. No known damage was caused as a result of this storm and storm-force winds were only recorded over a small area on the Texas coastline. The storm produced minor rainfall over south Texas with Brownsville recording 0.56 in (14 mm) and Corpus Christi recording 0.95 in (24.1 in). Winds up to 43 mph (69 km/h) were reported in Brownsville around 1 am CST (0800 UTC) on September 7.

=== Tropical depression ===
In late September, a low-pressure area detached from a dissipating frontal system and gradually organized into a tropical system over warm sea surface temperatures in the central Atlantic. A tropical depression formed by late on September 29. However, the depression transitioned into an extratropical cyclone on October 1 as it merged with another frontal system.

=== Tropical Storm Four ===
- Tropical storm (SSHWS)
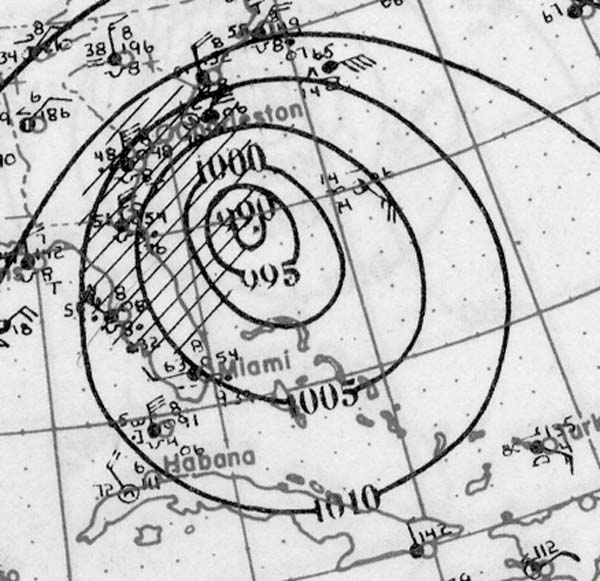
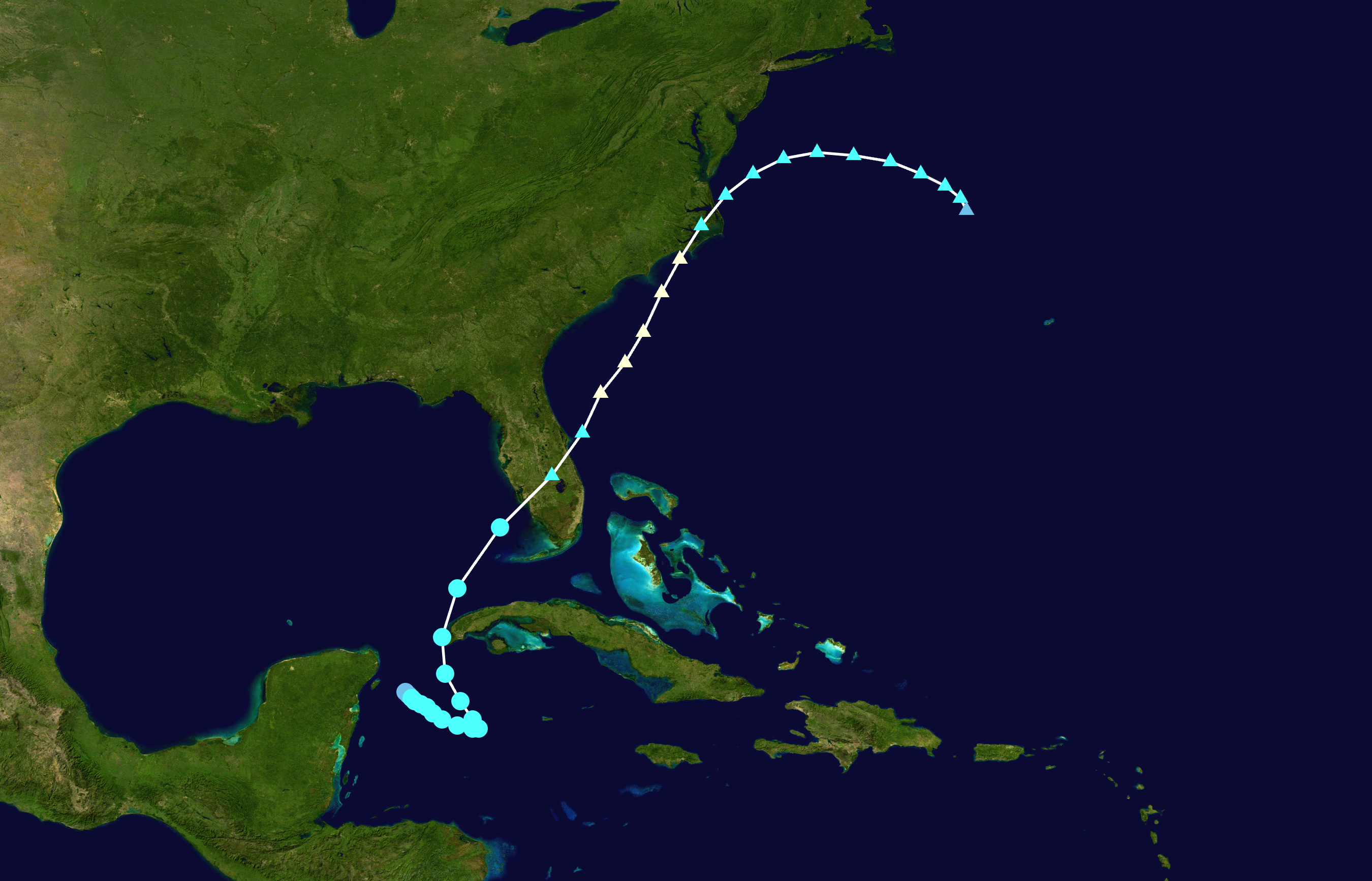
- Duration: November 27 – December 1
- Peak intensity: 65 mph (100 km/h) (1-min); <996 mbar (hPa)

A tropical depression developed near the Yucatan Peninsula early on November 27. The depression drifted southeastward and gradually strengthened into a tropical storm. Once in the gulf, it accelerated and intensified to winds of 65 mph (105 km/h). Early on December 1, the storm made landfall near Fort Myers, Florida, at the same intensity. The system weakened and soon became extratropical. The extratropical cyclone emerged over the eastern Atlantic several hours later and regained hurricane-force winds. By 0000 UTC, the extratropical system peaked with winds of 90 mph (140 km/h) and a minimum pressure of 980 mbar (29 inHg). Around this time, the U. S. S. Patoka, which was in the vicinity of the storm, recorded a pressure of 978.5 mbar (28.90 inHg). The northeastward movement slowed shortly after crossing Florida. Around 2300 UTC, it made landfall between Wilmington and Cape Hatteras with winds equivalent to a minimal hurricane. Shortly after landfall, maximum sustained winds in the storm dropped below 75 mph (121 km/h). A strong area of high pressure located over the Canadian Maritimes caused the system to turn east-southeastward. On December 5, the storm weakened further to the equivalent of a tropical depression as the system began to move towards the south. The remnants of the storm continued eastward, passing several hundred miles north of Bermuda later that day. The cyclone was reported near the Azores on December 9, before finally merging with another cyclone over the North Atlantic.

The storm caused significant property and crop damage along the Gulf Coast of Florida. Trees, power lines, and telegraph wires were uprooted or knocked down by high winds along the Suwannee River. Structures which were previously considered to be safe from storms, being over 100 ft (30 m) inland, sustained significant damage from what was likely storm surge. The beaches along the Atlantic coast also sustained considerable damages from the storm. Four people were killed near Tampa in two separate incidents. The first occurred when a house collapsed on three men, pinning them to the ground. The second incident occurred after a woman ran outside her home and was struck by a tree limb. In North Carolina, heavy rains and strong winds were reported along the coast. Near record high water rises were recorded around Wilmington. Cape Hatteras was temporarily isolated from the surrounding areas as the high winds from the storm knocked down power lines throughout the area. Several buildings along the coast and numerous boats sustained considerable damage. Property loses were estimated in the millions, with $1 million in Jacksonville alone. Damages to the citrus industry were also significant, with total losses exceeding $600,000. In addition to the severe impacts on land, numerous shipping incidents resulted in several deaths. A schooner carrying seven people sunk with no survivors. A tug boat sank off the coast of Mobile, Alabama, while towing a lumber barge, the fate of the crew is unknown. A ship named the American SS Cotopaxi sank between Charleston, South Carolina and the northern coast of Cuba; all 30 crew members drowned. A ship carrying about 2,000 cases of liquor with a crew of six sank near Daytona Beach. Near Savannah, Georgia, a yacht sank, drowning 12 crew members. At least 55 deaths occurred at sea.

== See also ==
- 1900–1940 South Pacific cyclone seasons
- 1900–1950 South-West Indian Ocean cyclone seasons
- 1920s Australian region cyclone seasons
