= SS Demosthenes =

SS Demosthenes can refer to:

- SS Demosthenes (1911), a UK ocean liner built in 1911 and scrapped in 1931
- USS William Isom (ID-1555), an oil tanker built in the USA in 1917, renamed Demosthenes and registered in Panama in 1948; she was scrapped in 1955
