= Obotrita =

German barque

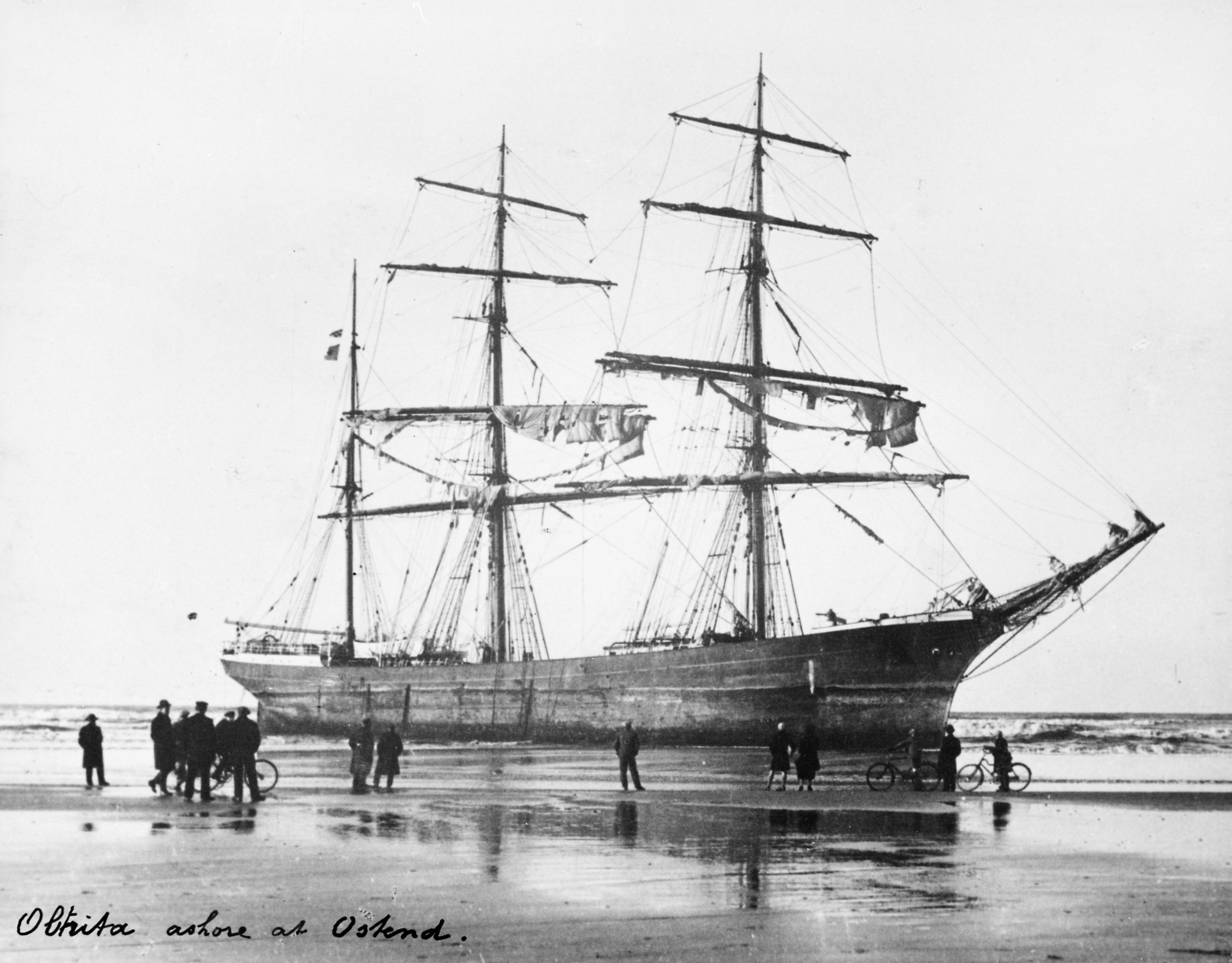
Obotrita beached

Obotrita was a German barque, built in 1892 in Helsingør (Denmark). She had a tonnage of 1477 GRT (Gross register tonnage) and 1394 NRT (Net register tonnage) and belonged to the Eug Celler company in Hamburg. Her former name was Favorita. On November 16, 1925, the barque beached near Ostend, Belgium.

Names:

- Favorita
- Obotrita
