= SS Cotopaxi =

American bulk carrier sunk in 1925

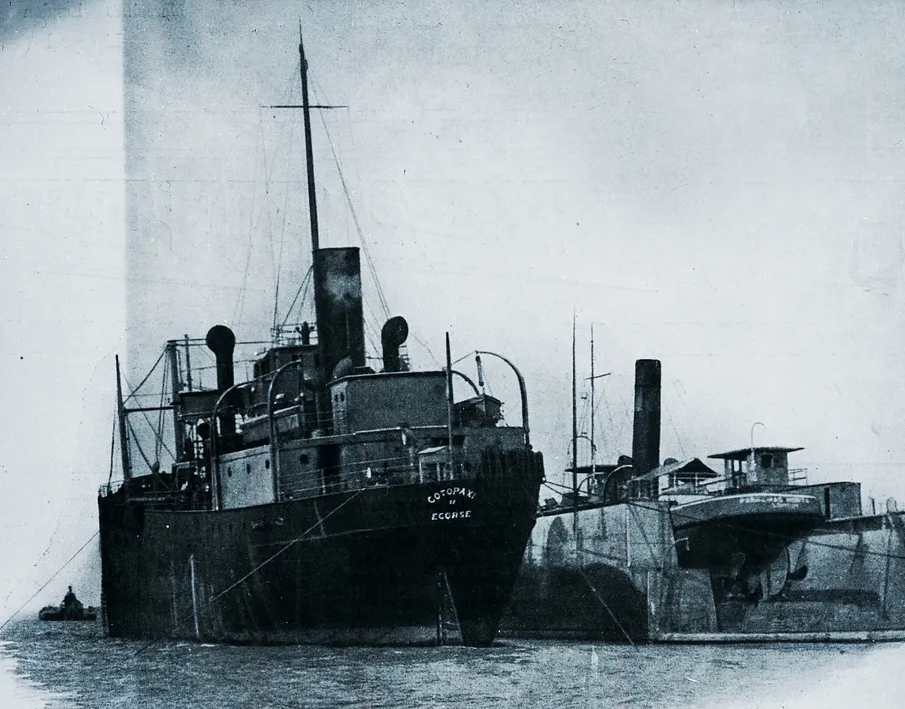
- The Cotopaxi in Pará, Brazil, 1919

History

United States
- Name: Cotopaxi
- Namesake: Cotopaxi volcano
- Owner: USSB (1918); Clinchfield Navigation Co. (1919–1925)
- Ordered: 5 March 1918
- Builder: Great Lakes Engineering Works, Ecorse
- Cost: US$827,648.48
- Yard number: 209
- Laid down: 29 August 1918
- Launched: 15 November 1918
- Commissioned: 30 November 1918
- Home port: New York
- Identification: US Official Number: 217270; Call sign: LNWH
- Fate: Foundered off Jacksonville, Florida, December 1925

General characteristics
- Type: Design 1060 ship
- Tonnage: 2,351 GRT; 1,433 NRT; 4,062 DWT
- Length: 253 ft 0 in (77.11 m) registered length
- Beam: 43 ft 8 in (13.31 m)
- Depth: 25 ft 6 in (7.77 m)
- Installed power: 211 Nhp; 1,350 ihp (1,010 kW); 2 x Scotch marine boilers
- Propulsion: Great Lakes Engineering Works 3-cylinder triple expansion
- Speed: 9.0 knots (16.7 km/h; 10.4 mph)
- Crew: 30-32

SS Cotopaxi was an Emergency Fleet Corporation (EFC) Design 1060 bulk carrier built for the United States Shipping Board (USSB) under the World War I emergency shipbuilding program. The ship, launched 15 November 1918, was named after the Cotopaxi stratovolcano of Ecuador. The ship arrived in Boston, 22 December 1918, to begin operations for the USSB, through 23 December 1919, when Cotopaxi was delivered to the Clinchfield Navigation Company under terms of sale.

During operation for the USSB the ship suffered serious damage in a grounding on the coast of Brazil, and later, operating for Clinchfield Navigation, was involved in a collision with a tug in Havana, Cuba, resulting in the tug being sunk. She and a crew of thirty-two vanished in December 1925, while en route from Charleston, South Carolina, to Havana, with a cargo of coal.

The wreck was discovered in the 1980s, but not identified until January 2020.

== Description ==
Cotopaxi was one of seventeen EFC Design 1060 4,200 DWT, 2,351 GRT steam-powered "Laker" type bulk carrier ships built for the USSB by the Great Lakes Engineering Works (GLEW), River Rouge Yard, Ecorse, Michigan, as hull number 209. The design was unique to GLEW (Note: The twenty-four 1060 ships were built at one of the two yards. Seven were built at the Ashtabula Yards, Ashtabula, Ohio, with the remaining seventeen ships built at the River Rouge Yards, Ecorse.) with deckhouse and engines aft (a design commonly termed a "Stemwinder") with four cargo hatches forward served by two masts. (Note: The reference, EFC Design 1060: Illustrations has inboard profile, plan and photographs of sister ships.)

Cotopaxi, official number (Note: The number assigned as the United States unique identifier for commercial vessels prior to the adoption of the IMO number system introduced in 1987, and mandatory 1 January 1996, by international treaty.) 217270, signal letters LNWH, was 253.4 ft (77.2 m) registered length, 43.7 ft (13.3 m) beam with a depth of 25.1 ft (7.7 m). The keel was laid 29 August 1918, with launch on 15 November, and delivery to the USSB on 30 November 1918. The Design 1060 ships were propelled by one triple expansion engine of 1,350 indicated horsepower (1,010 kW) with steam power from two coal fired Scotch marine boilers. The ship was completed at a cost of $827,648.48 (equivalent to $17,702,000 in 2025).

== Operation ==
After arrival in Boston, on 22 December 1918, the ship was allocated to a USSB operator serving routes from U.S. ports to the East coast of South America. On 16 June 1919, while on a voyage from Philadelphia to Salvador, Brazil, Cotopaxi ran aground in the Braganca Channel, Pará, Brazil. After jettisoning some 400 tons of coal the ship limped into port on 19 June, badly damaged, including damage to the engines. Repairs cost nearly $200,000 (equivalent to about $3,700,000 in 2025).

On 23 December 1919, Cotopaxi was delivered to the Clinchfield Navigation Company under terms of a sale at a price of $375,000, with $93,750 to be paid cash, with $281,250 to be paid in three installments of $93,750, on promissory notes secured by mortgage on the ship due on 22 December 1920, 1921, and 1922. In 1920, the ship entered Havana Harbor, on a voyage from Charleston, South Carolina, with a cargo of coal and collided with the Ward Line tug Saturno. Cotopaxi was not seriously damaged but the tug sank. A case resulting from the accident was on appeal determined to be the equal fault of both vessels and damages were thus allocated.

== Final voyage ==
On 29 November 1925, Cotopaxi departed Charleston, for Havana, under Captain W. J. Meyer, with a cargo of coal and a crew of thirty-two. On 1 December, Cotopaxi radioed a distress call reporting that the ship was listing and taking on water during a tropical storm. The ship was officially listed as overdue on 31 December.

== Wreck ==
The wreck of Cotopaxi lies 35 nmi (65 km; 40 mi) off St. Augustine, Florida. She was discovered in the 1980s, but could not be identified, and subsequently dubbed the "Bear Wreck". Cotopaxi was identified in January 2020, based on fifteen years of investigation by marine biologist Michael Barnette.

== Similar fate for sister ships ==
Cotopaxi was one of three of the seventeen Design 1060 ships built at the River Rouge Yard lost and initially listed as missing. Coushatta (hull 216, ON 217728), renamed John Tracy, was listed as missing on a voyage from Norfolk, Virginia, to Boston, January 1927. The ship is now listed among the collier wrecks of Stellwagen Bank National Marine Sanctuary where ships with coal cargoes are second only to fishing vessels as victims of disaster. Coverun (hull 221, ON 218005), after being renamed Mahukona, and then sold and operating as Santa Clara, under the Brazilian flag, was listed as missing southwest of Bermuda, February 1941, while on a voyage from Newport News to Rio de Janeiro. Several were lost due to wartime action, with others lost to other causes. Corydon (hull 206, ON 217236) foundered in the Bahama Channel during a hurricane in September 1919. Cottonwood (hull 211, ON 217423), renamed Stanburn, foundered October 1946, after striking a submerged object.

One of the ships, Covena (hull 220, ON 217810), became notable as the unique (Note: The other nine port repair ships were conversions from Navy Maritime Commission type N3-M-A1 vessels.) U.S. Army Port Repair ship Junior N. Van Noy. That ship was first of the port repair ships to sail for Europe where it engaged in repairs at Cherbourg, France.

== In fiction ==
In the 1977 film Close Encounters of the Third Kind, Cotopaxi is connected to the legend of the Bermuda Triangle, and is discovered in the Gobi Desert, presumably set there by extraterrestrial forces.
