= List of tallest lighthouses in the United States =

The height of existing lighthouses is expressed in two measures: the height of the tower itself, and the distance from the focal plane (that is, the center) of the light source to the water. The latter can be much greater than the former if the light stands on a promontory.

Several structures which have functioned as lighthouses exceed the height of any entry in this list, among them the Statue of Liberty at 305 feet (93 m) and Perry's Victory and International Peace Memorial at 352 feet (107 m). These are not listed because they were not constructed as lighthouses per se.

== Tallest lighthouses ==
| Height | Lighthouse | State | Reference |
|---|---|---|---|
| 210 feet (64 m) | Cape Hatteras Light | North Carolina | |
| 191 feet (58 m) | Cape Charles Light | Virginia | |
| 175 feet (53 m) | Ponce de Leon Inlet Light | Florida | |
| 171 feet (52 m) | Absecon Light | New Jersey | |
| 169 feet (52 m) | Cape Lookout Light | North Carolina | |
| 168 feet (51 m) | Fire Island Light | New York | |
| 165 feet (50 m) | St. Augustine Light | Florida | |
| 164 feet (50 m) | Cape Henry Light | Virginia | |
| 163 feet (50 m) | Barnegat Light | New Jersey | |
| 162 feet (49 m) | Navassa Island Light | Navassa Island | |
| 161 feet (49 m) | Morris Island Light | South Carolina | |
| 158 feet (48 m) | Currituck Beach Light | North Carolina | |
| 158 feet (48 m) | Bodie Island Light | North Carolina | |
| 157 feet (48 m) | Cape May Light | New Jersey | |
| 157 feet (48 m) | Dry Tortugas Light | Florida | |
| 151 feet (46 m) | Cape Canaveral Light | Florida | |
| 150 feet (46 m) | Pensacola Light | Florida | |
| 150 feet (46 m) | Cape Romain Lighthouses | South Carolina | |
| 148 feet (45 m) | Oak Island Light | North Carolina | |
| 144 feet (44 m) | Tybee Island Light | Georgia | |
| 142 feet (43 m) | Hillsboro Inlet Light | Florida | |
| 142 feet (43 m) | Assateague Light | Virginia | |
| 140 feet (43 m) | Charleston Light | South Carolina | |
| 138 feet (42 m) | Moloka'i Light | Hawaii | |
| 137 feet (42 m) | Rock of Ages Light | Michigan | |
| 136 feet (41 m) | Hunting Island Light | South Carolina | |
| 133 feet (41 m) | Boon Island Light | Maine | |
| 131 feet (40 m) | Sand Island Light | Alabama | |
| 124 feet (38 m) | Cape Ann Light | Massachusetts | |
| 121 feet (37 m) | White Shoal Light | Michigan | |
| 120 feet (37 m) | Sand Key Light | Florida | |
| 120 feet (37 m) | Mobile Point Light | Alabama | |
| 119 feet (36 m) | Petit Manan Light | Maine | |
| 116 feet (35 m) | Point Bolivar Light | Texas | |
| 115 feet (35 m) | Point Arena Light | California | |
| 115 feet (35 m) | Pigeon Point Light | California | |
| 113 feet (34 m) | Grosse Point Light | Illinois | |
| 112 feet (34 m) | Big Sable Point Light | Michigan | |
| 111 feet (34 m) | Rawley Point Light | Wisconsin | |
| 110 feet (34 m) | Montauk Point Light | New York | |
| 110 feet (34 m) | Stannard Rock Light | Michigan | |
| 109 feet (33 m) | Presque Isle Light | Michigan | |
| 108 feet (33 m) | Wind Point Light | Wisconsin | |
| 108 feet (33 m) | Jupiter Inlet Light | Florida | |
| 107 feet (33 m) | Little Sable Point | Michigan | |
| 107 feet (33 m) | Grays Harbor Light | Washington | |
| 105 feet (32 m) | Craighill Channel Lower Range Rear Light | Maryland | |
| 104 feet (32 m) | St. Simons Island Light | Georgia | |
| 104 feet (32 m) | Summersville Lake | West Virginia | |
| 100 feet (30 m) | Marcus Hook Light | Delaware | |
| 100 feet (30 m) | Bald Head Light | North Carolina | |
| 99 feet (30 m) | South Manitou Island Light | Michigan | |
| 99 feet (30 m) | Grosse Ile North | Michigan | |
| 98 feet (30 m) | Sanibel Island Light | Florida | |
| 98 feet (30 m) | Sturgeon Bay Canal Light | Wisconsin | |
| 95 feet (29 m) | Cape Florida Light | Florida | |
| 94 feet (29 m) | Destruction Island Light | Washington | |
| 93 feet (28 m) | Yaquina Head Light | Oregon | |
| 93 feet (28 m) | Spectacle Reef Light | Michigan | |
| 91 feet (28 m) | Sand Hills Light | Michigan | |
| 90 feet (27 m) | St. George Reef Light | California | |
| 90 feet (27 m) | Harbour Town Light | South Carolina | |
| 89 feet (27 m) | Pointe aux Barques Light | Michigan | |
| 89 feet (27 m) | New London Harbor Light | Connecticut | |
| 89 feet (27 m) | Cana Island Light | Wisconsin | |
| 87 feet (27 m) | Au Sable Light | Michigan | |
| 86 feet (26 m) | Key West Light | Florida | |
| 85 feet (26 m) | Fort Gratiot Light | Michigan | |
| 84 feet (26 m) | Alcatraz Island Light | California | |
| 81 feet (25 m) | St. Johns River Light | Florida | |
| 80 feet (24 m) | Portland Head Light | Maine | |
| 80 feet (24 m) | Manitou Island Light | Michigan | |
| 78 feet (24 m) | Whitefish Point Light | Michigan | |
| 78 feet (24 m) | Seul Choix Light | Michigan | |
| 77 feet (23 m) | Gray's Reef Light | Michigan | |
| 76 feet (23 m) | Waugoshance Light | Michigan | |
| 76 feet (23 m) | Middle Island Light | Michigan | |
| 76 feet (23 m) | Cape Decision Light | Alaska | |
| 75 feet (23 m) | Ocracoke Light | North Carolina | |
| 75 feet (23 m) | St. Martin Island Light | Michigan | |
| 74 feet (23 m) | Piedras Blancas Light | California | |
| 71 feet (22 m) | Sturgeon Point Light | Michigan | |
| 71 feet (22 m) | St. Helena Island Light | Michigan | |
| 70 feet (21 m) | Poverty Island Light | Michigan | |
| 70 feet (21 m) | New Point Loma lighthouse | California | |
| 70 feet (21 m) | Minneapolis Shoal Light | Michigan | |
| 69 feet (21 m) | Los Angeles Harbor Light | California | |
| 68 feet (21 m) | Five Finger Islands Light | Alaska | |
| 67 feet (20 m) | Tawas Point Light | Michigan | |
| 67 feet (20 m) | Point Vicente Light | California | |
| 67 feet (20 m) | Frankfort Light | Michigan | |
| 67 feet (20 m) | Cape Hinchinbrook Light | Alaska | |
| 67 feet (20 m) | Marblehead Light | Ohio | |
| 66 feet (20 m) | Tree Point Light | Alaska | |
| 66 feet (20 m) | St. Johns Light | Florida | |
| 66 feet (20 m) | Highland Light | Massachusetts | |
| 65 feet (20 m) | Rock Harbor Light | Michigan | |
| 65 feet (20 m) | Point Iroquois Light | Michigan | |
| 65 feet (20 m) | North Head Light | Washington | |
| 65 feet (20 m) | Cedar River Light | Michigan | |
| 65 feet (20 m) | Cape Flattery Light | Washington | |
| 65 feet (20 m) | Big Bay Point Light | Michigan | |
| 63 feet (19 m) | North Manitou Shoal Light | Michigan | |
| 63 feet (19 m) | New Dungeness Light | Washington | |
| 63 feet (19 m) | DeTour Reef Light | Michigan | |
| 62 feet (19 m) | Tillamook Light | Oregon | |
| 62 feet (19 m) | Thunder Bay Island | Michigan | |
| 62 feet (19 m) | Ludington Light | Michigan | |
| 62 feet (19 m) | Grand Marais Harbor | Michigan | |
| 62 feet (19 m) | Grand Island Harbor | Michigan | |
| 62 feet (19 m) | Copper Harbor Light | Michigan | |
| 61 feet (19 m) | Umpqua River Light | Oregon | |
| 61 feet (19 m) | Mary Island Light | Alaska | |
| 61 feet (19 m) | Isle Royale Light | Michigan | |
| 61 feet (19 m) | Dunkirk Lighthouse | New York | |
| 60 feet (18 m) | Port Austin Lighthouse | Michigan | |
| 60 feet (18 m) | Poe Reef Light | Michigan | |
| 59 feet (18 m) | Cape Blanco Lighthouse | Oregon | |
| 59 feet (18 m) | Port Sanilac Light | Michigan | |
| 59 feet (18 m) | Lansing Shoals Light | Michigan | |
| 58 feet (18 m) | Old Point Comfort Light | Virginia | |
| 58 feet (18 m) | New Point Comfort Light | Virginia | |
| 58 feet (18 m) | Munising Light | Michigan | |
| 58 feet (18 m) | Ile Aux Galets Light | Michigan | |
| 58 feet (18 m) | Crisp Point Light | Michigan | |
| 58 feet (18 m) | Amelia Island Light | Florida | |
| 57 feet (17 m) | St. Joseph Inner | Michigan | |
| 57 feet (17 m) | Round Island Light | Michigan | |
| 56 feet (17 m) | Old Mackinac Point Light | Michigan | |
| 56 feet (17 m) | Eldred Rock Light | Alaska | |
| 56 feet (17 m) | Charlevoix South Pier Light | Michigan | |
| 55 feet (17 m) | Fourteen Mile Point Light | Michigan | |
| 55 feet (17 m) | Cape St. Elias Light | Alaska | |
| 54 feet (16 m) | Split Rock Lighthouse | Minnesota | |
| 54 feet (16 m) | Mobile Middle Bay Light | Alabama | |
| 53 feet (16 m) | St. Joseph Outer | Michigan | |
| 53 feet (16 m) | Squaw Island Light | Michigan | |
| 53 feet (16 m) | Muskegon South | Michigan | |
| 53 feet (16 m) | Cape Disappointment Light | Washington | |
| 52 feet (16 m) | Orient Point Light | New York | |
| 52 feet (16 m) | Point No Point Light (Maryland) | Maryland | |
| 52 feet (16 m) | Point Conception Light | California | |
| 52 feet (16 m) | Martin Reef Light | Michigan | |
| 52 feet (16 m) | Forty Mile Point Light | Michigan | |
| 51 feet (16 m) | Sentinel Island Light | Alaska | |
| 51 feet (16 m) | Sandy Point Shoal Light | Maryland | |
| 51 feet (16 m) | Portage River | Michigan | |
| 51 feet (16 m) | Little Traverse Light | Michigan | |
| 51 feet (16 m) | Grand Haven South Inner | Michigan | |
| 50 feet (15 m) | Harbor Beach Light | Michigan | |
| 49 feet (15 m) | Bar Point Shoal Light | Michigan | |
| 48 feet (15 m) | Point Sur Light | California | |
| 48 feet (15 m) | Point Hueneme Light | California | |
| 48 feet (15 m) | East Brother Island | California | |
| 47 feet (14 m) | Point Cabrillo Light | California | |
| 47 feet (14 m) | Grand Traverse Light | Michigan | |
| 46 feet (14 m) | Saugerties Light | New York | |
| 46 feet (14 m) | Point Wilson Light | Washington | |
| 46 feet (14 m) | Old Point Loma lighthouse | California | |
| 46 feet (14 m) | Gull Rock Light | Michigan | |
| 46 feet (14 m) | Drum Point Light | Maryland | |
| 46 feet (14 m) | Charity Island Light | Michigan | |
| 46 feet (14 m) | Beaver Island Head | Michigan | |
| 45 feet (14 m) | Windmill Point Light | Michigan | |
| 45 feet (14 m) | Ontonagon Light | Michigan | |
| 45 feet (14 m) | Beavertail Light | Rhode Island | |
| 45 feet (14 m) | Battery Island Light | California | |
| 45 feet (14 m) | Race Point Light | Massachusetts | |
| 44 feet (13 m) | Cape Arago Light | Oregon | |
| 44 feet (13 m) | South Fox Island Light | Michigan | |
| 44 feet (13 m) | Sand Point Light | Michigan | |
| 44 feet (13 m) | Passage Island Light | Michigan | |
| 44 feet (13 m) | Bete Grise | Michigan | |
| 44 feet (13 m) | Manistee | Michigan | |
| 44 feet (13 m) | Eagle Harbor Light | Michigan | |
| 44 feet (13 m) | Cheboygan River Light | Michigan | |
| 44 feet (13 m) | Bois Blanc Island | Michigan | |
| 43 feet (13 m) | Thomas Point Shoal Light | Maryland | |
| 43 feet (13 m) | Point Pinos Light | California | |
| 43 feet (13 m) | Grand Marais Harbor Outer | Michigan | |
| 43 feet (13 m) | Cape Mendocino Light | California | |
| 42 feet (13 m) | Huntington Harbor Light | New York | |
| 41 feet (12 m) | Farallon Island Light | California | |
| 41 feet (12 m) | Beaver Island Harbor Light | Michigan | |
| 41 feet (12 m) | Cape Neddick Light | Maine | |
| 40 feet (12 m) | St. Clair Flats South Light | Michigan | |
| 40 feet (12 m) | San Luis Obispo Light | California | |
| 40 feet (12 m) | Round Island Passage Light | Michigan | |
| 40 feet (12 m) | Peninsula Point Light | Michigan | |
| 40 feet (12 m) | Marquette Harbor Light | Michigan | |
| 40 feet (12 m) | Granite Island Light | Michigan | |
| 40 feet (12 m) | Grand Island North Light | Michigan | |
| 40 feet (12 m) | Anacapa Island Light | California | |
| 39 feet (12 m) | Presque Isle Light (Old) | Michigan | |
| 39 feet (12 m) | Huron Island Light | Michigan | |
| 39 feet (12 m) | Grand Island East Channel Light | Michigan | |
| 39 feet (12 m) | Wood End Light | Massachusetts | |
| 38 feet (12 m) | Long Point Light | Massachusetts | |
| 38 feet (12 m) | White River Light | Michigan | |
| 38 feet (12 m) | McGulpin's Point Light | Michigan | |
| 38 feet (12 m) | Lime Kiln Light | Washington | |
| 38 feet (12 m) | Cove Point Light | Maryland | |
| 37 feet (11 m) | Point Betsie Light | Michigan | |
| 37 feet (11 m) | Alki Point Light | Washington | |
| 36 feet (11 m) | Saginaw River Rear Range Light | Michigan | |
| 36 feet (11 m) | Mission Point Light | Michigan | |
| 36 feet (11 m) | Marquette Breakwater Outer Light | Michigan | |
| 36 feet (11 m) | Grand Haven South Pierhead Entrance Light | Michigan | |
| 36 feet (11 m) | Fourteen Foot Shoal Light | Michigan | |
| 36 feet (11 m) | Concord Point Light | Maryland | |
| 35 feet (11 m) | Patos Island Light | Washington | |
| 35 feet (11 m) | Point Reyes Light | California | |
| 35 feet (11 m) | Table Bluff Light | California | |
| 35 feet (11 m) | South Haven South Pier Light | Michigan | |
| 35 feet (11 m) | Sharps Island Light | Maryland | |
| 35 feet (11 m) | Round Island Light | Michigan | |
| 35 feet (11 m) | Manistique East Breakwater Light | Michigan | |
| 35 feet (11 m) | Cape Sarichef Light | Alaska | |
| 34 feet (10 m) | Menominee North Pier Light | Michigan | |
| 34 feet (10 m) | Copper Harbor Rear Range Light | Michigan | |
| 34 feet (10 m) | Burrows Island Light | Washington | |
| 34 feet (10 m) | Alpena Light | Michigan | |
| 34 feet (10 m) | Cape Meares Lighthouse | Oregon | |
| 33 feet (10 m) | Point Bonita Light | California | |
| 33 feet (10 m) | Pipe Island Light | Michigan | |
| 33 feet (10 m) | Ontonagon Harbor West Pierhead Light | Michigan | |
| 33 feet (10 m) | Munising Rear Range Light | Michigan | |
| 33 feet (10 m) | Cheboygan Crib Light | Michigan | |
| 32 feet (9.8 m) | Holland Harbor Light | Michigan | |
| 31 feet (9.4 m) | Marshall Point Light | Maine | |
| 31 feet (9.4 m) | Keweenaw Waterway Lower Entrance Light | Michigan | |
| 30 feet (9.1 m) | Presque Isle Harbor Breakwater Light | Michigan | |
| 30 feet (9.1 m) | Point No Point Light | Washington | |
| 30 feet (9.1 m) | Point Montara Light | California | |
| 30 feet (9.1 m) | Point Fermin Light | California | |
| 30 feet (9.1 m) | Owls Head Light | Maine | |
| 30 feet (9.1 m) | Mukilteo Light | Washington | |
| 30 feet (9.1 m) | Guard Island Light | Alaska | |
| 30 feet (9.1 m) | Admiralty Head Light | Washington | |
| 28 feet (8.5 m) | Muskegon Pier Light | Michigan | |
| 27 feet (8.2 m) | Punta Gorda Light | California | |
| 27 feet (8.2 m) | Fort Point Light | California | |
| 25 feet (7.6 m) | Yerba Buena Island | California | |
| 25 feet (7.6 m) | Trinidad Head Light | California | |
| 25 feet (7.6 m) | Point Retreat Light | Alaska | |
| 25 feet (7.6 m) | Cape Spencer Light | Alaska | |
| 24 feet (7.3 m) | Eagle River Light | Michigan | |
| 23 feet (7.0 m) | West Point Light | Washington | |
| 23 feet (7.0 m) | Cedar Key Light | Florida | |
| 21 feet (6.4 m) | Copper Harbor Front Range Light | Michigan | |
| 20 feet (6.1 m) | Lime Point Light | California | |
| 20 feet (6.1 m) | Bush Point Light | Washington | |
| 16 feet (4.9 m) | St. Clair Flats South Channel Front Range Light | Michigan | |

== Highest focal plane ==
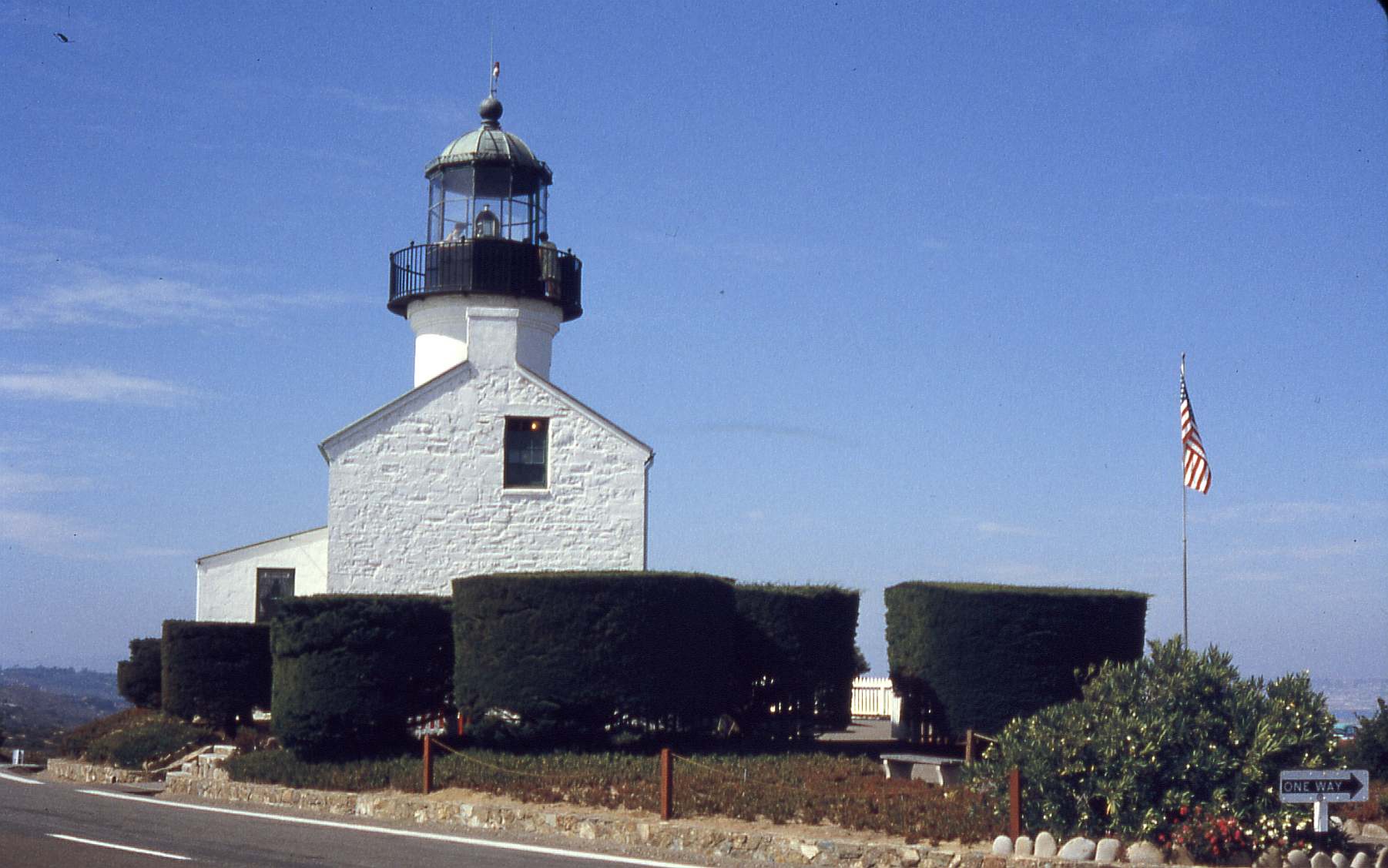
Old Point Loma Light

1. 462 feet (141 m) - Old Point Loma lighthouse, California
2. 422 feet (129 m) - Cape Mendocino Light, California
3. 420 feet (128 m) - Makapuu Point Light, Hawaii
4. 395 feet (120 m) - Navassa Island Light, Navassa Island
5. 358 feet (109 m) - Farallon Island Light, California
6. 294 feet (90 m) - Point Reyes Light, California
7. 278 feet (76 m) - Marcus Hook Range Rear Light, Delaware
8. 277 feet (84 m) - Anacapa Island Light, California
9. 273 feet (83 m) - Point Sur Light, California
10. 258 feet (79 m) - Block Island Southeast Light, Rhode Island (since its move to higher ground)
11. 235 feet (71 m) - Cape Hinchinbrook Light, Alaska
12. 214 feet (65 m) - Alcatraz Island Light, California
13. 213 feet (65 m) - Molokaʻi Light, Hawaii
14. 196 feet (60 m) - Trinidad Head Light, California
15. 192 feet (59 m) - Cape Hatteras Light, North Carolina
16. 191 feet (58 m) - Pensacola Lighthouse, Florida
17. 185 feet (56 m) - Point Vicente Light, California
18. 183 feet (56 m) - Highland (Cape Cod) Light, Massachusetts
19. 180 feet (55 m) - Cape Charles Light, Cape Charles, Virginia
20. 180 feet (55 m) - Fire Island Light, New York
21. 180 feet (55 m) - Seguin Light, Maine
22. 178 feet (54 m) - Monhegan Island Light, Maine
23. 176 feet (54 m) - Table Bluff Light, California
24. 170 feet (52 m) - Cape Sarichef Light, Alaska
25. 169 feet (51 m) - Oak Island Light, North Carolina
26. 168 feet (51 m) - Montauk Point Light, New York
27. 166 feet (51 m) - Cape Ann Light, Massachusetts
28. 165 feet (50 m) - Barnegat Light, New Jersey
29. 163 feet (50 m) - Charleston Light, South Carolina
30. 161 feet (49 m) - St. Augustine Light, Florida
31. 159 feet (48 m) - Ponce de Leon Inlet Light, Florida
32. 155 feet (47 m) - Point Arena Light, California
33. 154 feet (43 m) - Assateague Light, Virginia
34. 151 feet (46 m) - Dry Tortugas Light, Florida
35. 148 feet (45 m) - Pigeon Point Light, California
36. 146 feet (45 m) - Jupiter Inlet Light, Florida
37. 144 feet (44 m) - St. George Reef Light, California
38. 142 feet (43 m) - Piedras Blancas Light, California
39. 140 feet (43 m) - Point Bonita Light, California
40. 137 feet (42 m) - Boon Island Light, Maine
41. 137 feet (42 m) - Cape Canaveral, Florida
42. 134 feet (41 m) - Dice Head Light, Maine
43. 130 feet (40 m) - Rock of Ages Light, Michigan
44. 125 feet (38 m) - White Shoal Light, Michigan
45. 125 feet (38 m) - Mobile Point Light, Alabama
46. 123 feet (38 m) - Petit Manan Light, Maine
47. 120 feet (37 m) - Sand Key Light, Florida
48. 119 feet (36 m) - Grosse Point Light, Illinois
49. 116 feet (35 m) - San Luis Obispo Light, California
50. 111 feet (34 m) - Wind Point Light, Wisconsin
51. 110 feet (34 m) - Fort Point Light, California
52. 110 feet (30 m) - Bald Head Light, North Carolina
53. 113 feet (34 m) - Rawley Point Light, Wisconsin
54. 106 feet (32 m) - Eagle Island Light, Maine
55. 105 feet (35 m) - Cape Spencer Light, Alaska
56. 105 feet (32 m) - Baker Island Light, Maine
57. 105 feet (32 m) - Sturgeon Bay Canal Light, Wisconsin
58. 102 feet (31 m) - Sanibel Island Light, Florida
59. 101 feet (31 m) - St. Croix River Light, Maine
60. 101 feet (22 m) - Portland Head Light, Maine
61. 100 feet (30 m) - Point Fermin Light, California
62. 100 feet (30 m) - Owls Head Light, Maine
63. 100 feet (30 m) - Key West Light, Florida
64. 96 feet (29 m) - Cape Decision Light, Alaska
65. 95 feet (29 m) - Yerba Buena Island, California
66. 92 feet (28 m) - Heron Neck Light, Maine
67. 91 feet (28 m) - Libby Island Light, Maine
68. 91 feet (28 m) - Eldred Rock Light, Alaska
69. 90 feet (27 m) - Old Cape Henry Light, Virginia
70. 89 feet (27 m) - Point Pinos Light, California
71. 89 feet (27 m) - Cana Island Light, Wisconsin
72. 88 feet (27 m) - Point Loma Light (new), California
73. 86 feet (26 m) - Tree Point Light, Alaska
74. 86 feet (26 m) - Sentinel Island Light, Alaska
75. 85 feet (26 m) - Cape St. Elias Light, Alaska
76. 84 feet (26 m) - Point Cabrillo Light, California
77. 81 feet (25 m) - Five Finger Islands Light, Alaska
78. 77 feet (23 m) - Battery Island Light, California
79. 76 feet (23 m) - Mary Island Light, Alaska
80. 75 feet (23 m) - Whitehead Light, Maine
81. 75 feet (23 m) - Punta Gorda Light, California
82. 75 feet (23 m) - Mount Desert Light, Maine
83. 75 feet (23 m) - Cedar Key Light, Florida
84. 75 feet (23 m) - Burnt Coat Harbor Light, Maine
85. 73 feet (22 m) - Los Angeles Harbor Light, California
86. 72 feet (22 m) - Moose Peak Light, Maine
87. 70 feet (21 m) - Point Montara Light, California
88. 67 feet (20 m) - Great Duck Island Light, Maine
89. 67 feet (20 m) - Race Point Light, Massachusetts
90. 65 feet (20 m) - Two Bush Island Light, Maine
91. 64 feet (20 m) - Egg Rock Light, Maine
92. 63 feet (19 m) - Point Retreat Light, Alaska
93. 61 feet (19 m) - East Brother Island Light, California
94. 59 feet (18 m) - The Cuckolds Light, Maine
95. 57 feet (17 m) - Franklin Island Light, Maine
96. 56 feet (17 m) - Little River Light, Maine
97. 56 feet (17 m) - Carquinez Strait Light, California
98. 54 feet (16 m) - Saddleback Ledge Light, Maine
99. 54 feet (16 m) - Mobile Middle Bay Light, Alabama
100. 53 feet (16 m) - Lubec Channel Light, Maine
101. 52 feet (16 m) - Southampton Shoal Light, California
102. 52 feet (16 m) - Pond Island Light, Maine
103. 52 feet (16 m) - Point Hueneme Light, California
104. 52 feet (16 m) - Deer Island Thorofare Light, Maine
105. 52 feet (16 m) - Curtis Island Light, Maine
106. 45 feet (14 m) - Wood End Light, Massachusetts
107. 43 feet (13 m) - Hendricks Head Light, Maine
108. 42 feet (13 m) - Prospect Harbor Point Light, Maine
109. 41 feet (13 m) - Perkins Island Light, Maine
110. 39 feet (12 m) - Grindel Point Light, Maine
111. 39 feet (12 m) - Browns Head Light, Maine
112. 37 feet (11 m) - Crabtree Ledge Light, Maine
113. 36 feet (11 m) - Long Point Light, Massachusetts
114. 36 feet (11 m) - Ram Island Light, Maine
115. 33 feet (10 m) - Lime Point Light, California
116. 33 feet (10 m) - Doubling Point Rear Range Light, Maine
117. 33 feet (10 m) - Bear Island Light, Maine
118. 25 feet (8 m) - Squirrel Point Light, Maine
119. 25 feet (8 m) - Blue Hill Bay Light, Maine
120. 23 feet (7 m) - Guard Island Light, Alaska
121. 23 feet (7 m) - Doubling Point Light, Maine
