= List of lighthouses in Alaska =

This is a list of all lighthouses in the U.S. state of Alaska as identified by the United States Coast Guard. There are eleven active lights in the state; the other five have been replaced by automated skeleton towers.

The history of Alaskan lighthouses predates the Seward purchase: the Russians erected a light at Sitka, in Baranof Castle (located on Castle Hill); this light was found unnecessary by the Lighthouse Service and discontinued, but was taken over by the army and maintained by them until 1877. The first American lighthouses in the state were erected in 1902 but most early lights were rebuilt before 1940 in a distinctive Art Deco style; the only surviving building from the earlier group is the Eldred Rock Light. The last constructed were replacements for the lights on Unimak Island in 1950.

Alaska has the northernmost and westernmost lighthouses in the United States, and some of the most isolated as well. Keepers at the Cape Sarichef and Scotch Cap Lights on Unimak Island in the Aleutians were not permitted to bring their families to the station, and served four years before getting an entire year of leave; Cape Sarichef received no supplies from August 1912 to June 1913, and both lights shut down in the winter due to sea ice. Scotch Cap was also the site of the worst lighthouse disaster in US history, when it was destroyed by a tsunami in the 1946 Aleutian Islands earthquake, killing all five coastguardmen stationed there.

If not otherwise noted, focal height and coordinates are taken from the United States Coast Guard Light List, while location and dates of activation, automation, and deactivation are taken from the United States Coast Guard Historical information site for lighthouses.

Name	Image	Location	Coordinates	Year first lit	Automated	Year deactivated	Current Lens	Focal Height
Cape Decision Light				1932	1974	Active	DCB-24	96 ft (29 m)
Cape Hinchinbrook Light				1910 (First); 1934 (Current)	1974	Active	VRB-25	235 ft (72 m)
Cape Sarichef Light				1904 (First); 1950 (Last)	1979	1979 (Demolished in 1999)	None	177 ft (54 m)
Cape Spencer Light				1925	1974	Active	Unknown	105 ft (32 m)
Cape St. Elias Light				1916	1974	Active	VRB-25	85 ft (26 m)
Eldred Rock Light				1906	1973	Active	250mm	91 ft (28 m)
Fairway Island Light				1904	Never	Unknown (Est: 1917–1925)	None	41 ft (12 m)
Five Finger Islands Light				1902 (First); 1935 (Current)	1984	Active	Unknown	81 ft (25 m)
Guard Island Light				1904 (First); 1924 (Current)	1969	Active	Unknown	74 ft (23 m)
Lincoln Rock Light				1903 (First); 1944 (Last)	Never	1968 (Demolished)	None	58 ft (18 m)
Mary Island Light				1903 (First); 1937 (Current)	1969	Active	250mm	76 ft (23 m)
Point Retreat Light				1904 (First); 1923 (Current)	1973	Active	300mm	63 ft (19 m)
Point Sherman Light				1904 (First); 1981 (Current)	1911	Active	Unknown	20 ft (6.1 m)
Scotch Cap Light				1903 (First); 1950 (Last)	1971	1977	None	116 ft (35 m)
Sentinel Island Light				1902 (First); 1935 (Current)	1966	Active	Unknown	86 ft (26 m)
Tree Point Light				1904 (First); 1935 (Current)	1969	Active	VRB-25	86 ft (26 m)
