= Gravina Islands =

Island group off the southeastern coast of Alaska, United States

Coordinates: 55°10′N 131°35′W

The Gravina Islands are a group of islands that are a part of the Alexander Archipelago in southeast Alaska. The islands are bounded by the Clarence Strait on the west and the Revillagigedo Channel on the east.

The largest islands in the group are Gravina Island, Annette Island, Duke Island, and Mary Island.

The Spanish explorer Jacinto Caamaño named the Gravina Islands group in 1792, in honor of Federico Carlos Gravina y Nápoli.
