= Shinnecock Light =

Lighthouse in New York, United States

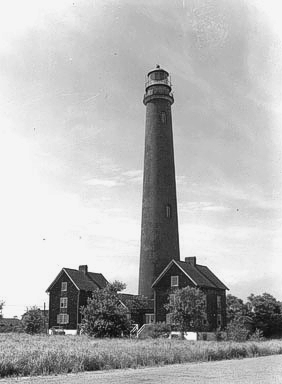
- 1948, just before it was demolished
- Location: Shinnecock Bay, south side of Long Island, New York
- Coordinates: 40°51′2″N 72°30′15″W

Tower
- Construction: Brick
- Height: 168 feet (51 m)
- Shape: Conical
- Markings: Red brick
- Fog signal: none

Light
- First lit: 1858
- Deactivated: 1931, demolished 1948
- Lens: 1st order Fresnel lens
- Characteristic: Fixed White (1901)

Shinnecock Light was a lighthouse on the south side of Long Island, New York. The name comes from the Shinnecock Indian Nation.

The original red brick tower was built in 1858. It was 168 feet (51 m) tall and had a 1st order Fresnel lens, itself almost 12 feet (3.7 m) tall. If it were still standing it would be one of the ten tallest lighthouses in the US. It was discontinued in 1931 in favor of a skeleton tower and demolished by the Coast Guard in 1948. Some time later the Coast Guard built a communication tower on the site and moved the light to the height of 75 feet (23 m) on that tower.
