= Peril Strait =

Strait in the Alexander Archipelago in Alaska

Coordinates: 57°31′52″N 135°16′14″W

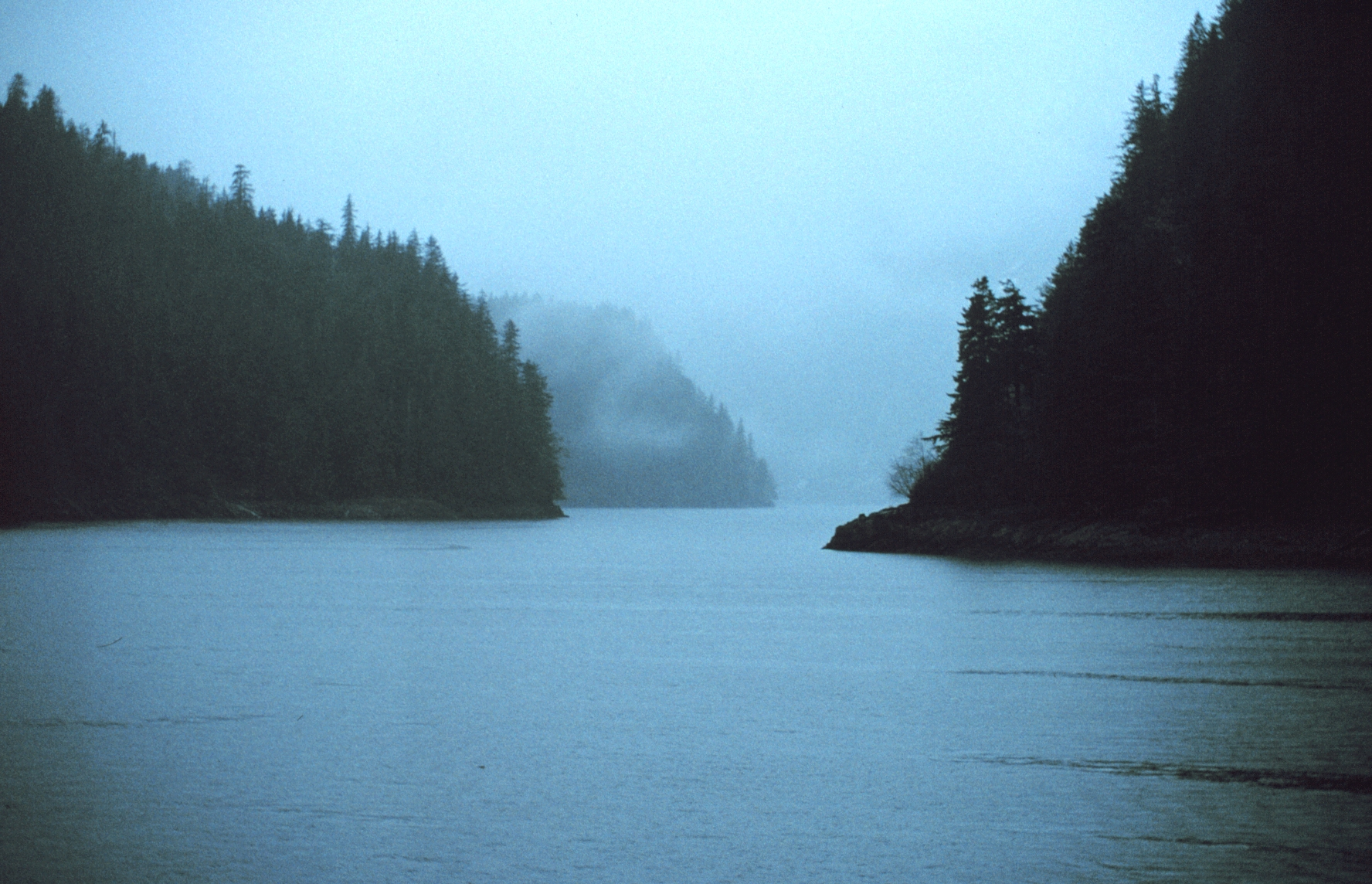
A misty Peril Strait

Peril Strait or Shee Káx’ is a strait in the Alexander Archipelago in southeastern Alaska. It is between Chichagof Island to its north and Baranof Island and Catherine Island to its south. The strait is 80 km (50 mi) long and reaches from Salisbury Sound on the west to the Chatham Strait on the east. It is entirely within the limits of the City and Borough of Sitka.

== Name ==
Shee Káx’ comes from “Shee” which is the original name of Baranof Island. Káx’ is “above”, a locative description.

The strait was named Proliv Pogibshy by Russians because of a fatal incident during a fur seal hunting expedition led by Alexander Baranof in 1799. According to V. F. Lisianski, Baranof employed Native Aleut hunters, ate poisonous shellfish from the strait, which resulted in approximately one hundred and fifty deaths. Beyond the strait are the points Poison Cove and Deadman's Reach, also named for the incident. Peril Strait is the United States Coast and Geodetic Survey translation of Proliv Pogibshiy.

This name Haat xhishxhaak is actually used in reference to Sergius Narrows, as well as any area with rapids or whirlpools. "Haat" is tide, rapids, whirlpool, back-eddy.

The name of Peril Strait is Shee Kax', "Shee" being the name of Baranof Island and kax' meaning "on top of".

Hoonah Sound is called Shee Kaax Yik (Up and Offset From Shee [Baranof Island]).

== Navigation ==
On May 10, 2004, the AMHS vessel M/V LeConte grounded on Cozian Reef in Peril Strait. There were no major injuries, and after an extensive salvage process, the LeConte was escorted to Ketchikan for successful repairs. The cause of the grounding was determined to be operator error, not tidal currents.

The Fairway Island Light, located on the eastern entrance to Peril Strait, was an important aid-to-navigation in the early 20th century.
