= Tongass Narrows =

Channel in southeastern Alaska, United States

Coordinates: 55.32333°N 131.61611°W

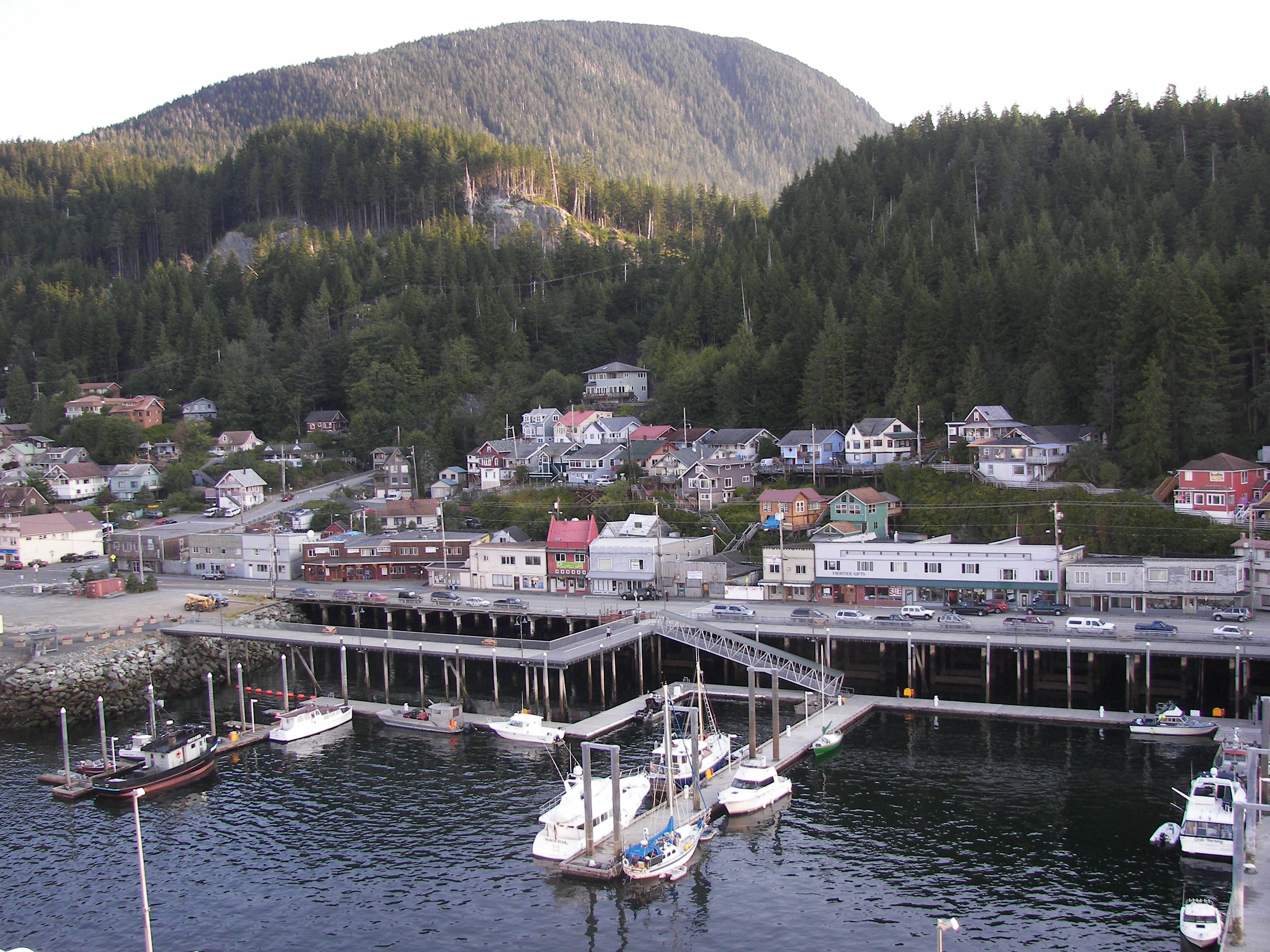
Ketchikan, Alaska seen from Tongass Narrows in August 2009

Tongass Narrows is a Y-shaped channel, part of Southeast Alaska's Inside Passage. The waterway forms part of the Alaska Marine Highway and as such, is used by charter, commercial fishing, and recreational vessels, as well as commercial freight barges and tanks, kayaks and passenger ferries. A proposal to build the Gravina Island Bridge across the Tongass Narrows was shelved due to a national-level controversy over the "bridge to nowhere".

== Geography ==
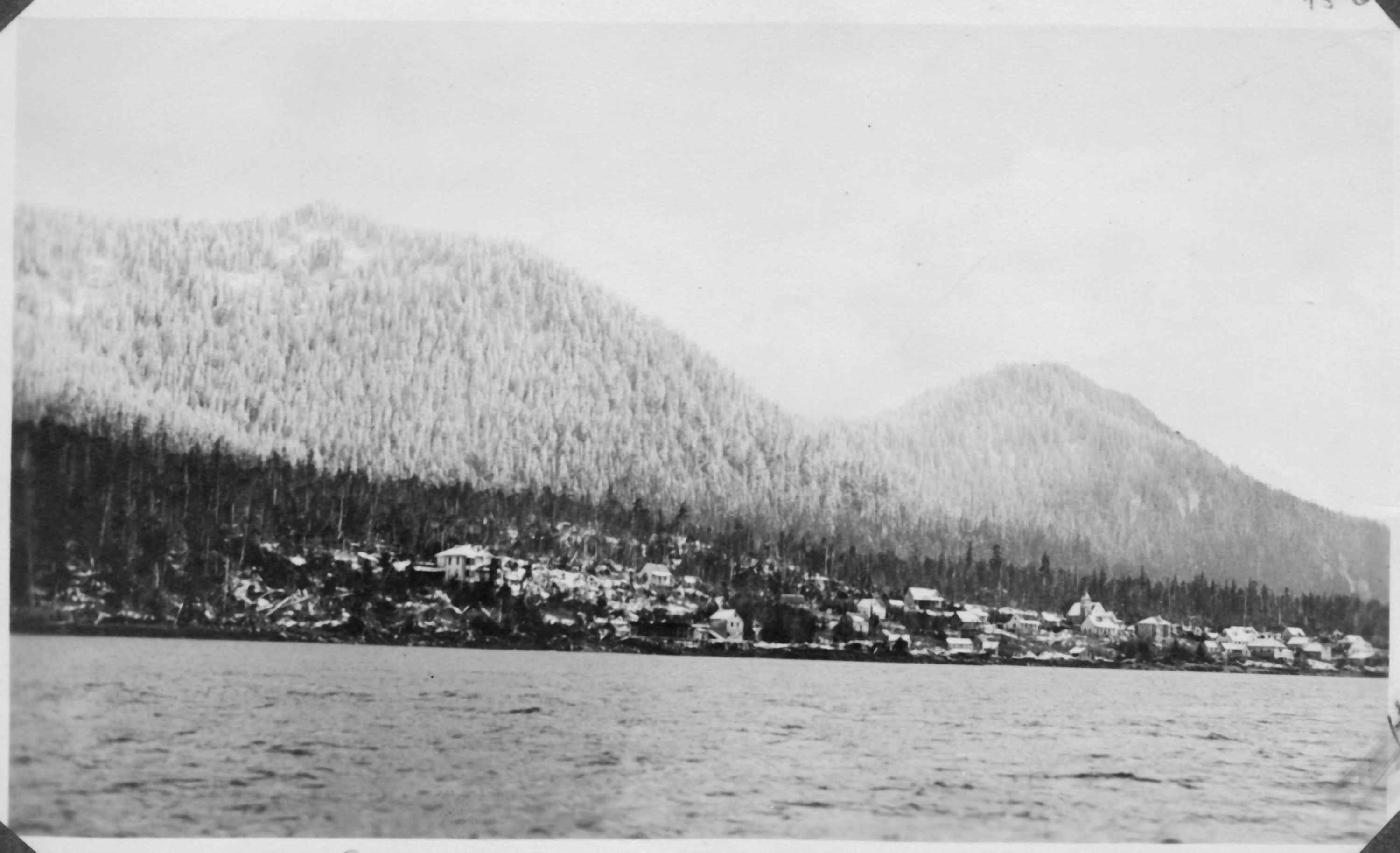
Saxman, Alaska as seen from Tongass Narrows in March 1917

Tongass Narrows is defined as the water body that extends from the Revillagigedo Channel to the Gravina Island in Clarence Strait. It is shaped as a "Y", split into two channels by Pennock Island. At its northern end is Clarence Strait. In the southeast it extends from Nichols Passage to Guard Island. The eastern side is bounded by Revillagigedo Island and the west by Gravina Island.

The eastern side of the narrows includes the cities of Saxman and Ketchikan. Ketchikan International Airport is located on Gravina Island. The channel extends in a generally northwest direction for about 14 miles (23 km). About 0.625 miles (1.0 km) westward of East Clump islet, the width of Tongass Narrows is 0.125 miles (200 m), the shoal water on the north side extending out 900 feet (270 m) from the high-water mark. In mid-channel, the depth is from 15 to 26 fathoms (27–48 metres (89–157 ft)). The north shore of Tongass Narrows is steep and heavily wooded. The south shores are low, flat, and wooded, with occasional open ground for 1–2 miles (1.6–3.2 km) back, where the land rises to the California Ridge.

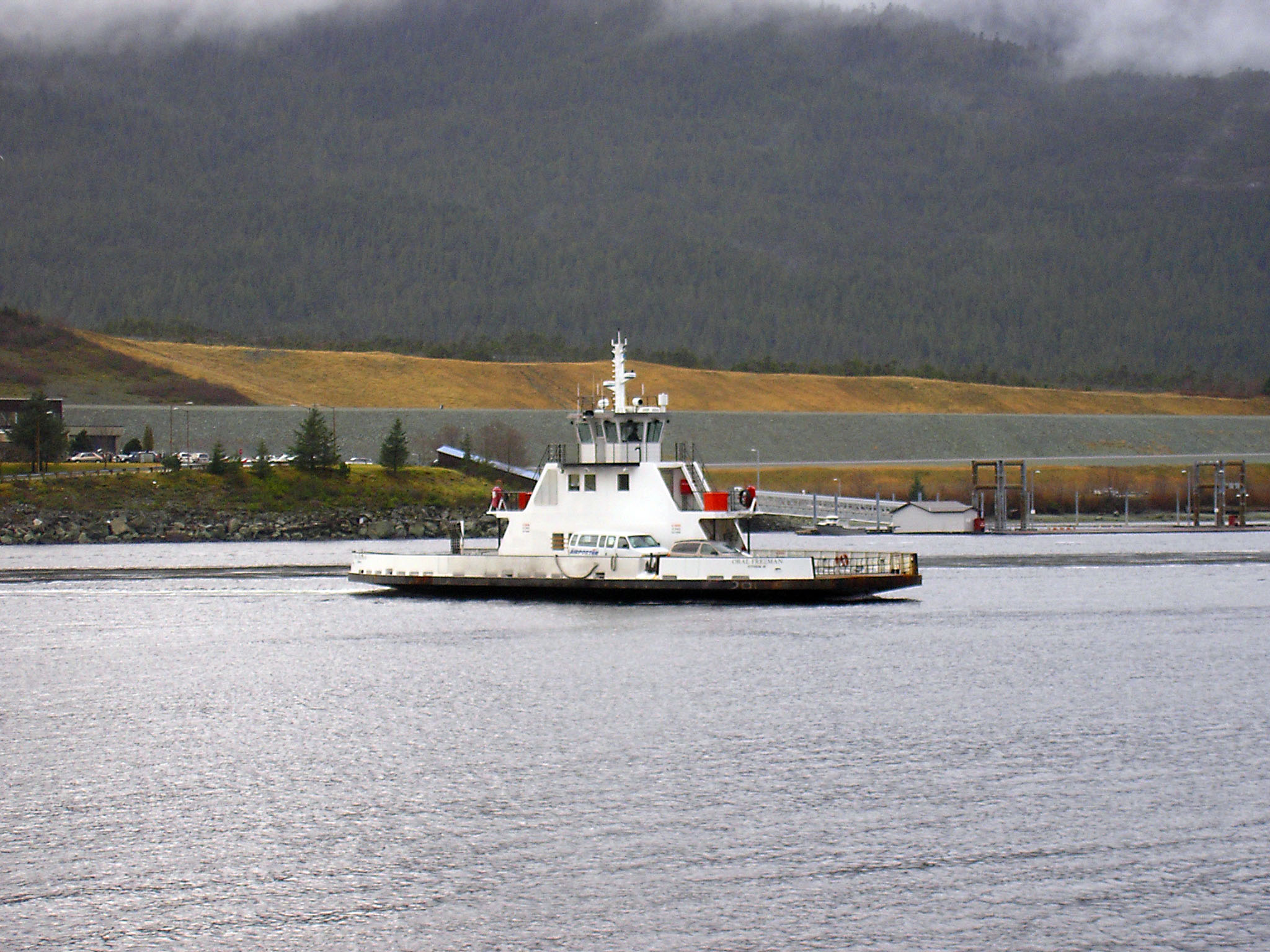
The Ketchikan and Gravina Island Ferry along the Tongass Narrows in November 2005

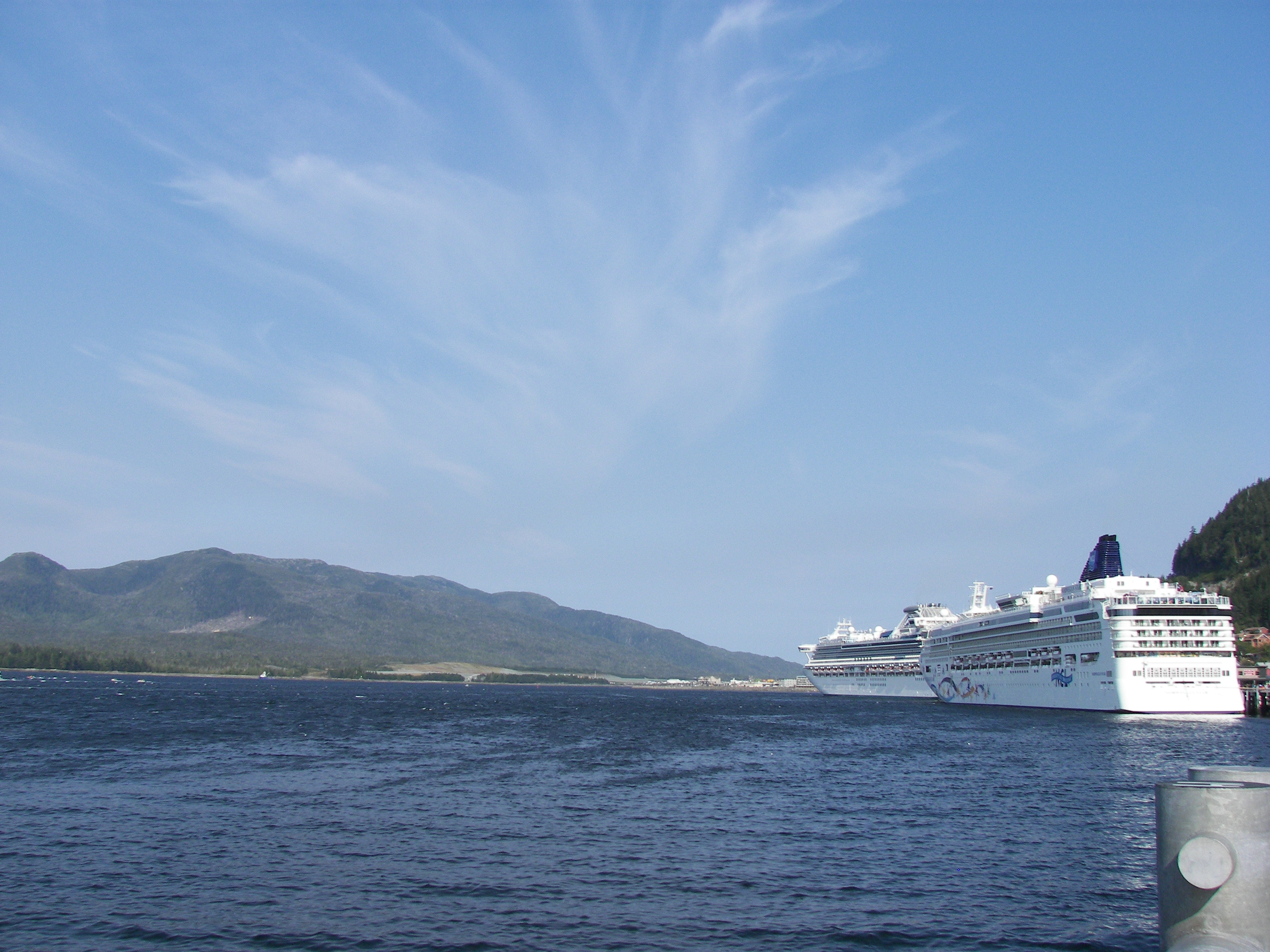
Norwegian Star outside Ketchikan, Alaska on the Tongass Narrows in August 2009

The Tongass Narrows is part of the Alaska Marine Highway system. Many types of vessels operate on the channel, such as charter, commercial fishing, and recreational vessels, as well as commercial freight barges and tanks, kayaks and passenger ferries. There is also extensive floatplane traffic on the Narrows, as Ketchikan is the regional center for air transportation to isolated communities. Maritime restrictions are most prevalent around Clam Cove (West Channel), Idaho Rock to the Coast Guard Base (East Channel), and Danger Island to Bar Harbor (North Channel).

The geological formation of "green stone schist, Paleozoic" is noted on the narrows near Ketchikan on its eastern side and also on the Gravina Island.

== Fauna ==
Some of the marine fauna noted in the Tongass are whales, sea lions, and herring in large numbers apart from salmon fishing near Ketchikan. Occasionally black bears have been seen foraging in garbage bins in the town.

== Gravina Island Bridge proposal ==
The Gravina Island Bridge proposal, was a plan to build a highway bridge across the Tongass Narrows from Revillagigedo Island to Gravina Island. It became the subject of national controversy as critics called the plan a "bridge to nowhere" while attacking its proposed cost of $320 million. The bridge, which would have replaced a ferry that connects Ketchikan to its major airport, has not been built.

== Events ==
One of the marine events held here by the Ketchikan Yacht Club in summer season every Wednesday night and on occasions during weekends is the sailboat regatta. The Christmas Boat Parade and the Pennock Island Swim also known as The Pennock Island Challenge are two other notable events. A fireworks display is held in a defined safety zone at the site of the barge.
