= Frederick Sound =

Passage of water in Alaska, United States

Coordinates: 57°10′36″N 133°54′23″W

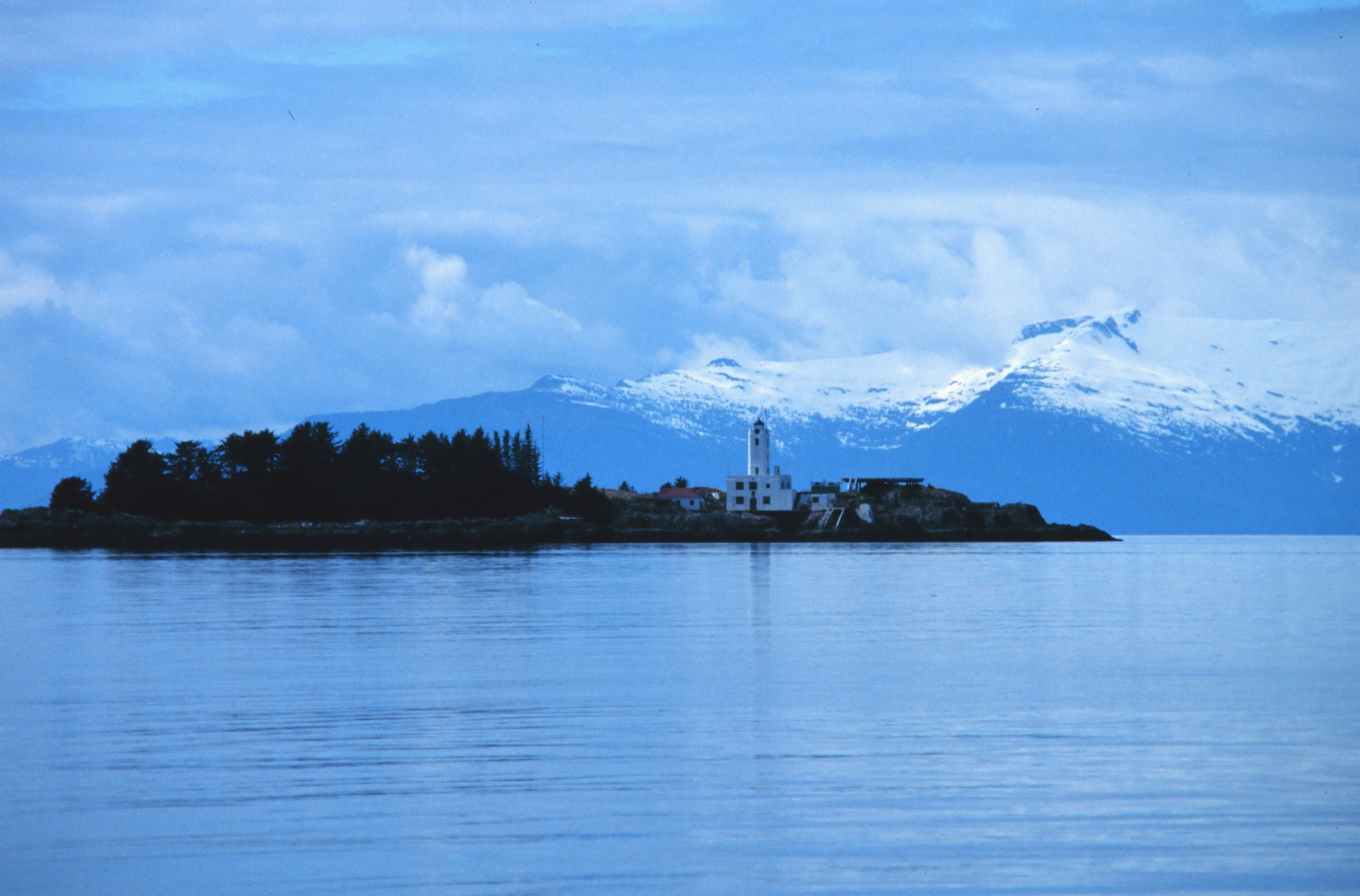
View across Frederick Sound, to the Five Finger Islands Light

Frederick Sound (also called Prince Frederick Sound or Prince Frederick's Sound) is a passage of water in the Alexander Archipelago in Southeast Alaska that separates Kupreanof Island to the south from Admiralty Island in the north.

Frederick Sound was named by Captain George Vancouver for Prince Frederick, Duke of York and Albany. It was first charted in 1794 by two of his men, Joseph Whidbey and James Johnstone. The sound may also be known as the Russian transliteration Fridrikhe Zund.

The sound is a popular location for watching whales in the summer and is busy marine passageway for both Alaska Marine Highway ferries and cruise ships.

The sound is home to the Five Finger Islands Light.
