= Pennock Island =

Island in Ketchikan Gateway Borough, Alaska

Coordinates: 55.319719999999997°N 131.62806°W

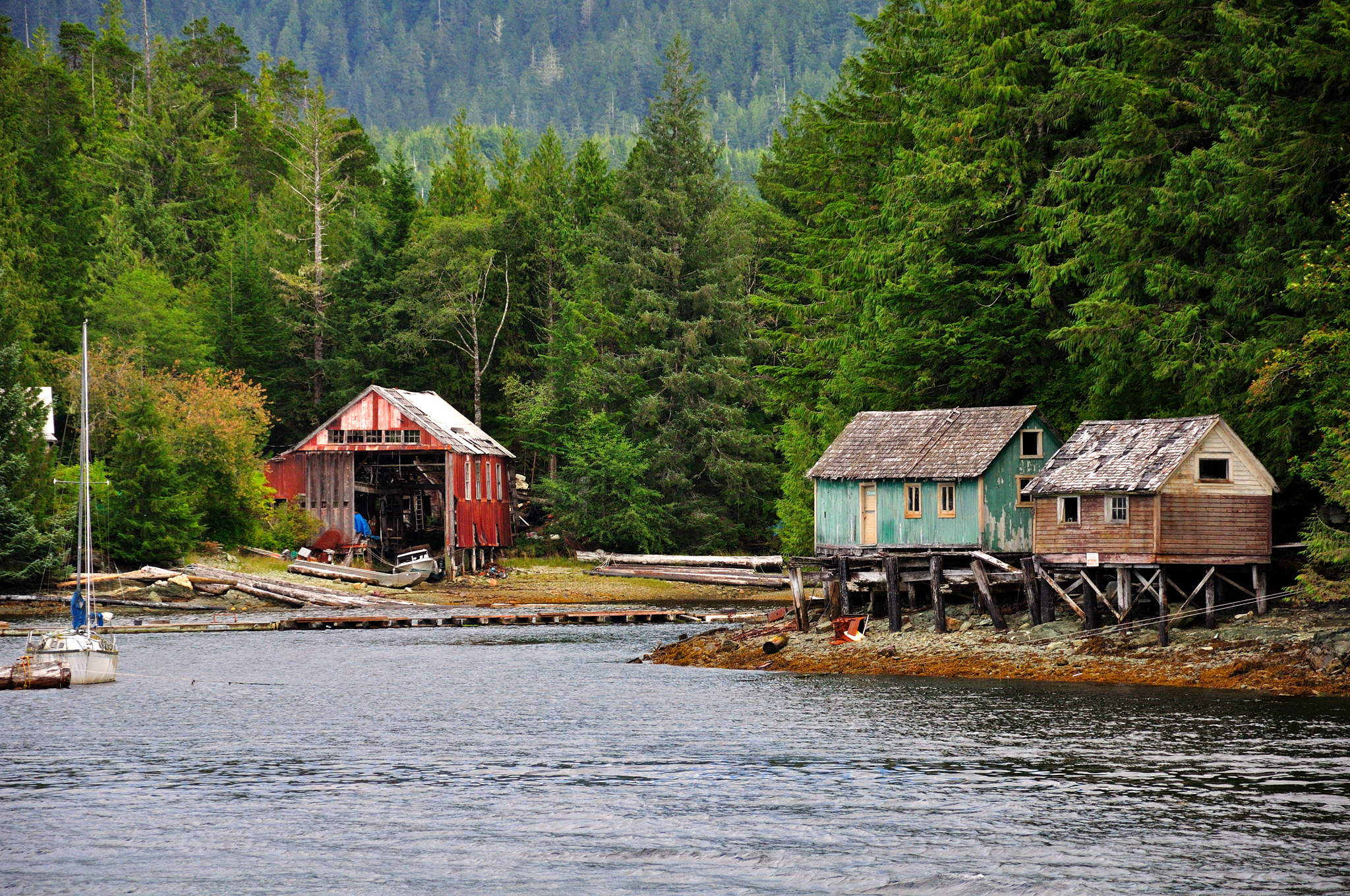
Pennock Island in Ketchikan, Alaska in August 2009

Pennock Island is located in the U.S. state of Alaska near the city of Ketchikan. The island is situated within the Ketchikan Gateway Borough and is part of the Alexander Archipelago. Most of the island is public land managed by the Tongass National Forest.

== Geography ==
Pennock Island lies between Gravina Island and Revillagigedo Island at the eastern end of Tongass Narrows, dividing the waterway into its East and West Channels. It measures about 3 miles (4.8 km) in length east and west, and from 0.25–0.625 miles (0.402–1.006 km) in width. It is rather low and wooded; its south shore is steep. California Rock is about 0.5 miles (0.80 km) from the east end of the island. East Clump islet is situated off the island's west end. Peninsula Point, which is west of Pennock, is the eastern entrance point to Ward Cove. Pennock reef extends to a length of 0.7 miles (1.1 km) into the Tongass Narrows and is 0.7 miles (1.1 km) to the south west of Ketchikan, opposite its downtown. The village of Pennock is located near Whiskey Cove, across from the Coast Guard Station Ketchikan.

A few houses are tucked within the thick wooded forest; there is minimal human habitation.

== History ==
It was named for the prospector Homer Pennock, around 1895 by Captain W.E. George, a local pilot. The ancestral tribal burial ground of the Taan ta Kwaan and the Sanyaa Kwáan are located on Pennock Island. The island is set in Tongass Narrows, which became the subject of national controversy over the Gravina Island Bridge proposal, criticized as the "bridge to nowhere".

== Demographics ==
Historical population
Census	Pop.	Note	%±
1940	79		—
1970	78		—
1980	90		15.4%
U.S. Decennial Census

Pennock Island first appeared on the 1940 United States census as an unincorporated settlement. It did not appear again until 1970. It was made a census-designated place (CDP) in 1980, but was dissolved in 1990 and has not appeared on the census separately since.

== Sports event ==
Pennock Island is the venue for the annual "Pennock Island Challenge" swim race which was started in 2004. The event is held to raise funds for the JDRF. The race course covers a distance of 8.2 miles (13.2 km) in a circular pattern around the rugged island. Events consist of solo race, relay race, wet suit and non-wet suit teams. Escort boats and kayak escorts are essential. Swimmers participating in the race are cold water specialists as water temperature during the race is likely to be between 55–60 °F (13–16 °C). The 2013 event was held on 4 August. The winner of the race is awarded a certificate recording the time and place and also awarded a medal.

== See also ==
- Cape Fox Village
