= Fairway Island Light =

- Location: Fairway Island; Peril Strait; Alaska; United States
- Coordinates: 57°26′29″N 134°52′17″W

Tower
- Constructed: 1904
- Construction: wooden tower
- Height: 6 feet (1.8 m)
- Shape: hexagonal tower

Light
- Deactivated: 1917
- Focal height: 41 feet (12 m)
- Lens: Fresnel lens
- Characteristic: F W

The Fairway Island Lighthouse is a lighthouse located on the eastern entrance to Peril Strait, Alaska. It is located on a small islet that lies between the southeastern end of Chichagof Island and northern Catherine Island, within the limits of Sitka City and Borough.

== History ==
Fairway Island Lighthouse was built in 1904 and deactivated sometime between 1917 and 1925.

== See also ==
- List of lighthouses in the United States
