= Sandy Point Shoal Light =

Lighthouse in Maryland, United States

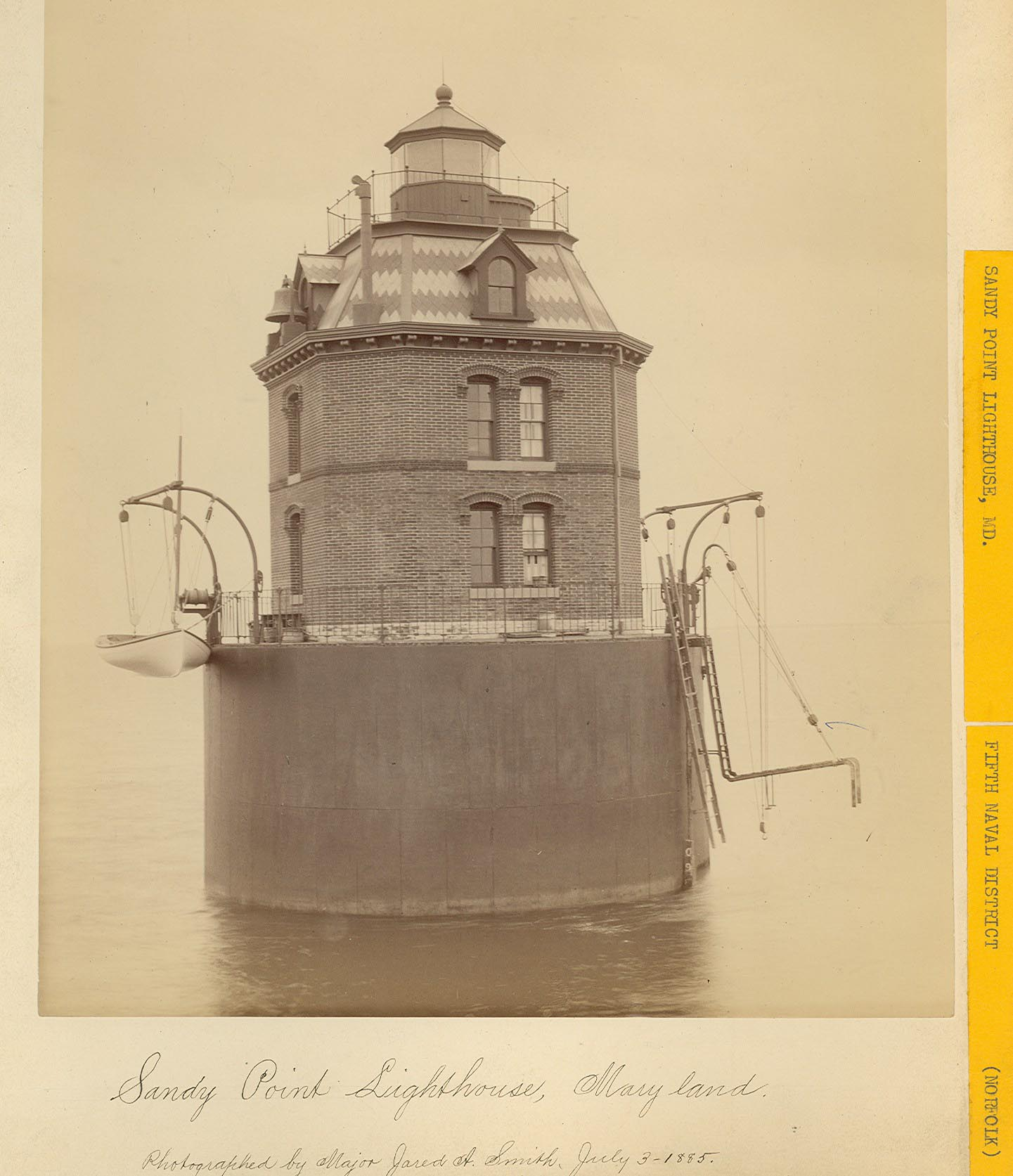
- 1885 photograph of Sandy Point Light (USCG)
- Location: off Sandy Point near the west end of the Chesapeake Bay Bridge
- Coordinates: 39.016°N 76.3845°W

Tower
- Constructed: 1883
- Foundation: caisson
- Construction: brick/wood-frame
- Automated: 1963
- Height: 11 m (36 ft)
- Shape: octagonal mansard roof house
- Markings: Red brick with white roof and brown foundation
- Heritage: National Register of Historic Places listed place
- Fog signal: none

Light
- First lit: 1883
- Focal height: 51 feet (16 m)
- Lens: fourth-order Fresnel lens (original), solar-powered (current)
- Range: 9 nautical miles (17 km; 10 mi)
- Characteristic: Flashing white 6 sec
- Sandy Point Shoal Light Station
- U.S. National Register of Historic Places
- Nearest city: Skidmore, Maryland
- Area: less than one acre
- Architect: Humes, W.J.
- MPS: Light Stations of the United States MPS
- NRHP reference No.: 02001424
- Added to NRHP: December 2, 2002

Sandy Point Shoal Light is a brick three story lighthouse on a caisson foundation that was erected in 1883. It lies about 0.6 mi (0.97 km) off Sandy Point, north of the Chesapeake Bay Bridge, from whose westbound span it is readily visible.

The current light replaced a brick tower on the point itself, integral to the keeper's house, which was erected in 1857. By 1874 the Lighthouse Board complained that the extent of the shoal and the poor equipment of the lighthouse made a new light necessary; appropriations were not forthcoming, however, until 1882. The whole gamut of light sources has been run, from oil wicks to incandescent oil vapor (1913) to electricity (1929). The characteristic changed from flashing to fixed and back to flashing along with the change in light source. The present light is powered by a pair of solar panels attached to the roof on the south side.

After automation in 1963, the light became subject to vandalism due to its visibility and its accessibility. The original lens was destroyed in 1979, apparently smashed with a baseball bat. Though the Coast Guard made efforts at maintaining and restoring the structure from 1988 to 1990, it continued to deteriorate. In 2006 it was sold at auction to a private bidder, after an unsuccessful attempt to find a non-profit group to take responsibility for the light. The Coast Guard continued to maintain the navigation aids until June 2019, when the light was discontinued due to the deterioration of the privately owned supporting structure. The structure was added to the National Register of Historic Places as Sandy Point Shoal Light Station on December 2, 2002.

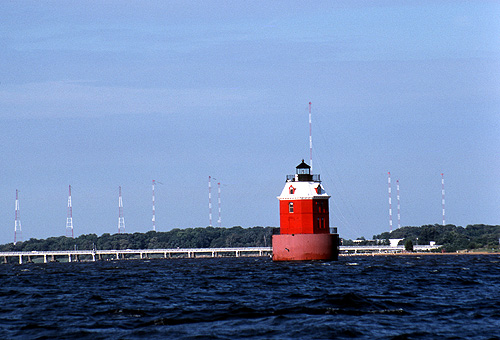
Sandy Point Shoal Light in July 1991

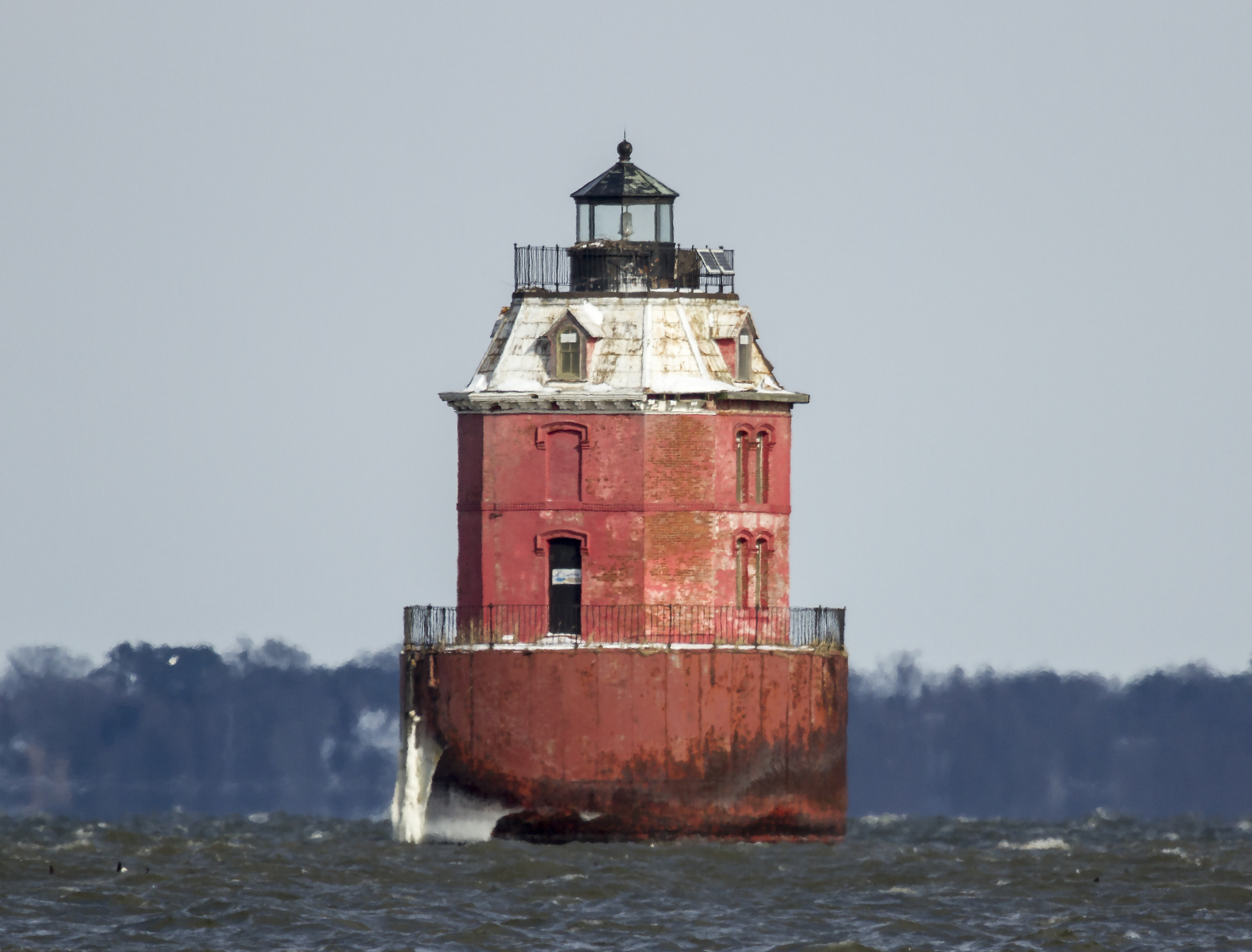
Sandy Point Shoal Light in 2015 from Sandy Point
