= St. Clair Flats Front and Rear Range Light =

Lighthouses in Michigan, United States

- St. Clair Flats South Channel Range Lights
- U.S. National Register of Historic Places
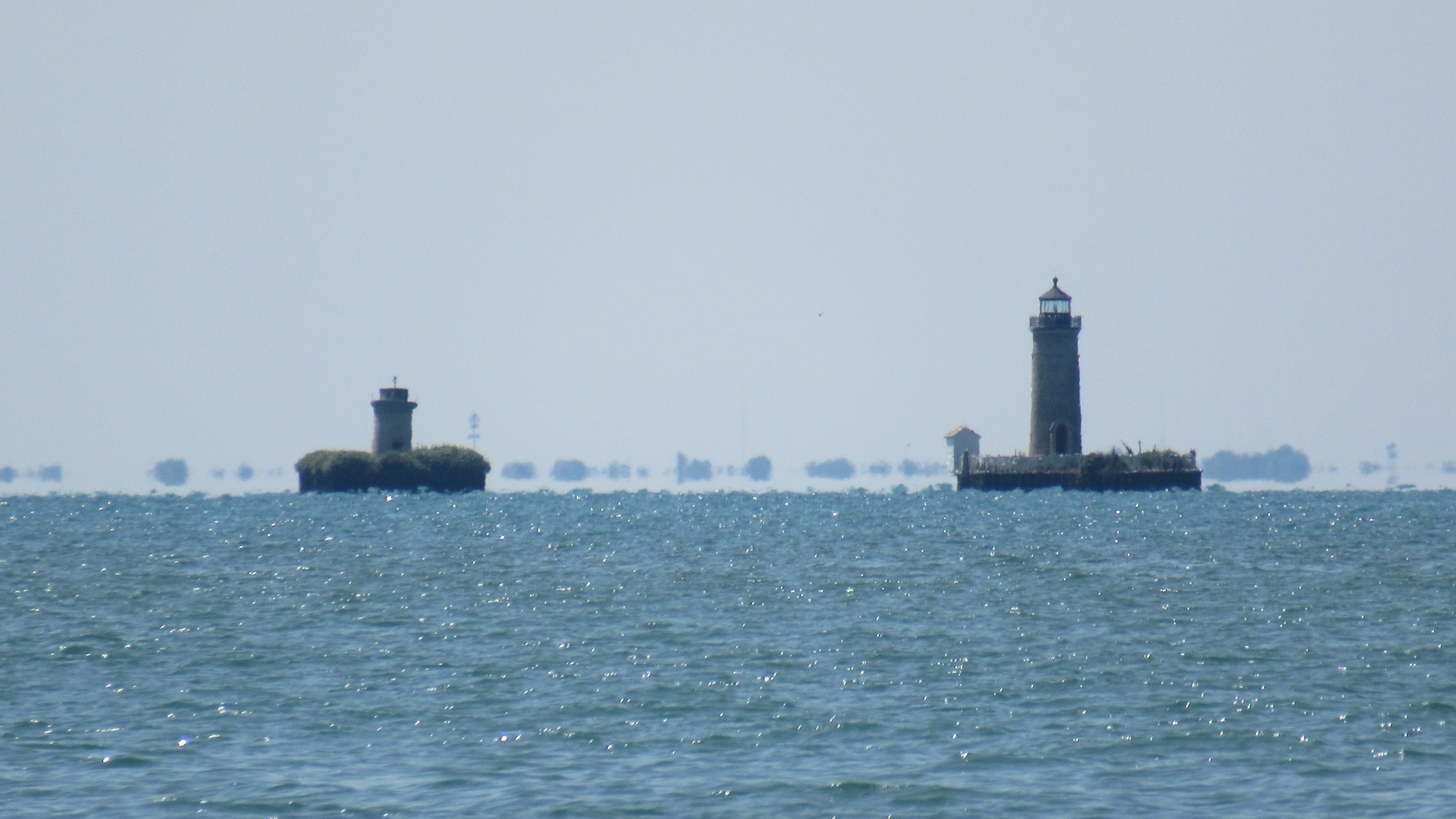
- Distant view of the lighthouse structures from Harsens Island in August 2022

- Location within Michigan Location within the United States
- Interactive map showing location
- Nearest city: Algonac, Michigan
- Coordinates: 42°32′16.4″N 82°41′35.4″W
- Area: 1.5 acres (0.61 ha)
- Built: 1859
- Architectural style: Conical lighthouse towers
- NRHP reference No.: 90000853
- Added to NRHP: May 24, 1990

St. Clair Flats Front and Rear Range Light are two lighthouse structures situated off the southeastern tip of Harsens Island at Lake St. Clair.

== History ==
By the late 1830s, it was recognized that constructing a shipping channel through the delta at the base of the Saint Clair River would be an aid in shipping. An 1842 survey by the Corps of Topographical Engineers recommended dredging the channel, but due in part to opposition by President James K. Polk, no federal funds were appropriated for a decade. In 1852, $20,000 was appropriated for improvements, but the money was quickly spent with little result. Meanwhile, the opening of the St. Mary's Falls Ship Canal in Sault Ste. Marie increased shipping through the Great Lakes and left the Saint Clair delta as the major bottleneck to commerce through the lakes.

In the early 1850s, numerous ship ran aground in the area, often blocking the entire canal and preventing access by other ships. Congress voted to appropriate further funds for improvements in 1854, but President Franklin Pierce vetoed the bills, as he did again in 1855 and 1856. By this time, the problem was severe, and in 1856, Congress overrode the presidential veto, and $45,000 was appropriated. From this funding, the canal dredging was completed, and two lighthouses and a nearby beacon constructed at the mouth of the channel. The two lighthouses were completed by 1859.

In 1866, a further $60,000 was appropriated for improvements. However, the United States Army Corps of Engineers recommended abandoning the current channel (known as the "south channel") and opening up a new Saint Clair Flats channel. This new channel was opened in 1870, after which the older channel became less important, but still used.

In 1875, the front light began to lean. It was dismantled and rebuilt using the original stone and timber crib. By the early 20th century, the lights had become less useful, and in 1907 their use was discontinued. However, in 1915, the lights were re-established, and continued in use until 1934, when they were again discontinued.

Despite the 1875 reconstruction, the front light began to lean further due to erosion near the base of the light. In 1990, the base was reinforced by constructing a steel cell and filling it with limestone for temporary support. In the fall of 1996, a permanent seawall was completed around the front light island.

The rear light was constructed with a large keeper's house on the island surrounding the light. The house was demolished in the early 1930s. However, later vandalism has played a part in the overall deterioration of the rear light, which is also in need of major foundation work. Current restoration has been taking place on the rear light.

== Description ==
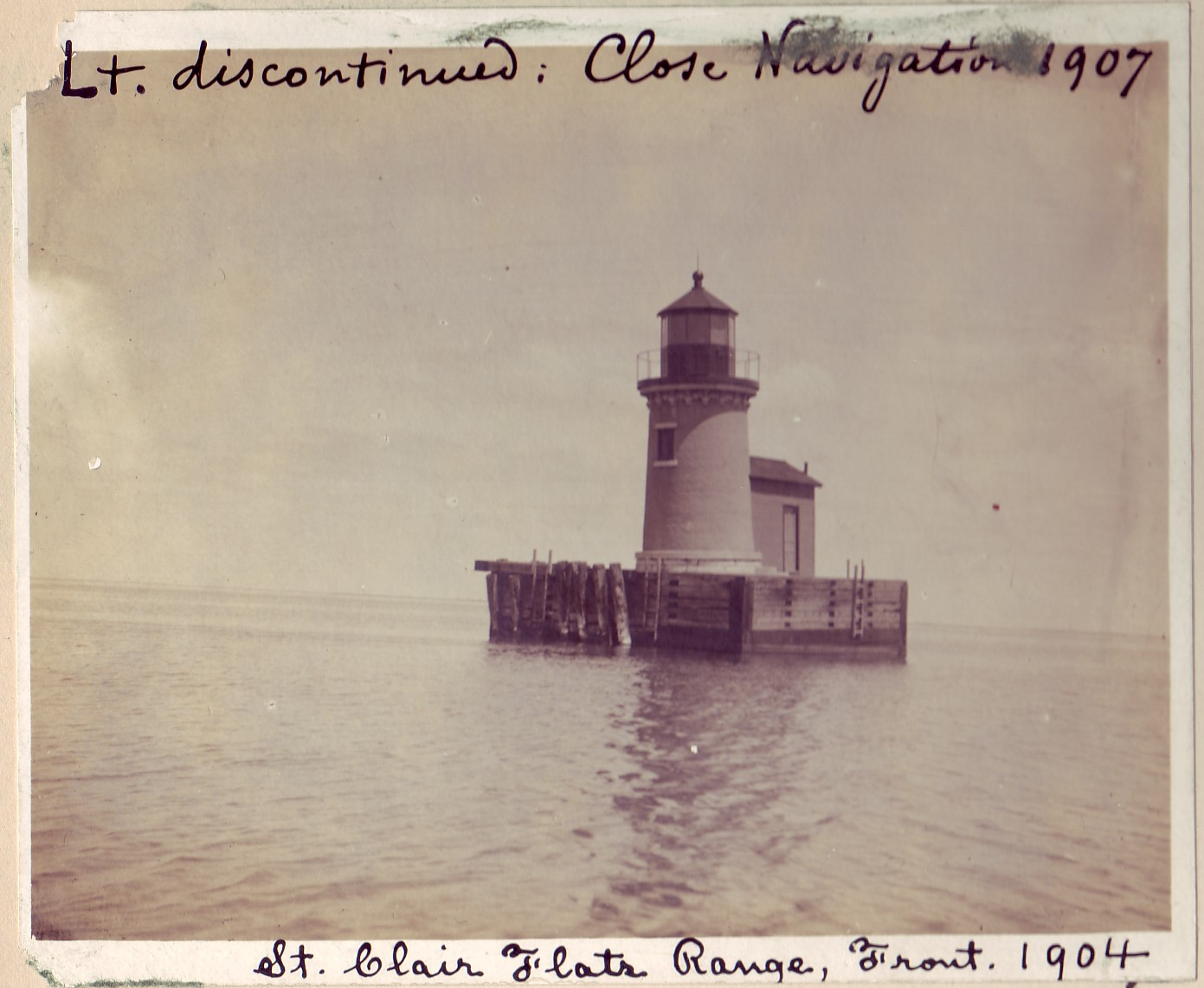
Front light in 1904

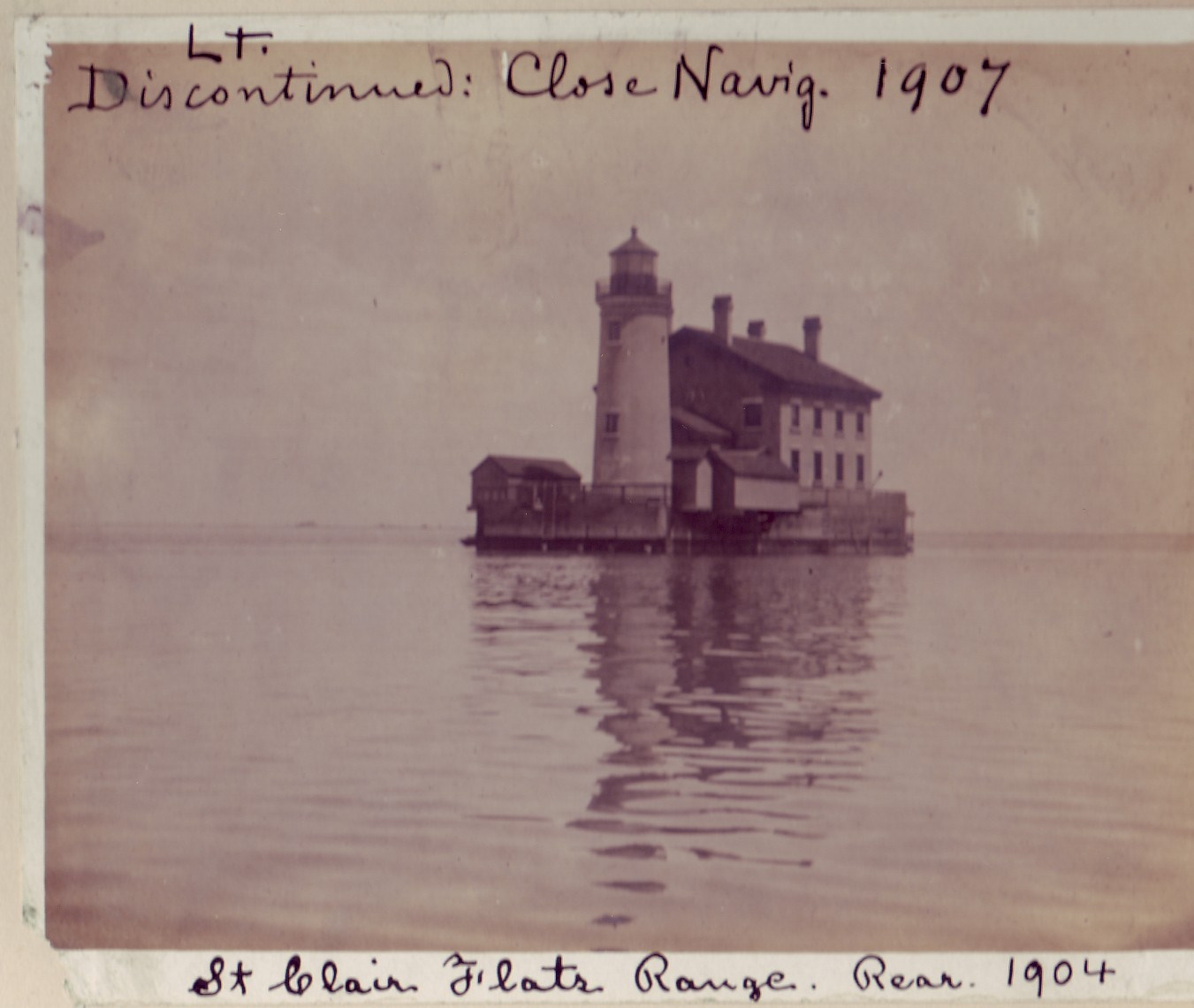
Rear light in 1904

The two range light towers are located in shallow water nearly a mile from the nearest land. The front range light is the smaller of the two, It is a cylindrical yellow brick tower, measuring 17 feet tall and tapering from 11 feet in diameter at the base to 10 feet in diameter in diameter at the top. It sits on a stone base atop a submerged timber crib structure. A single square-head door in the base of the tower leads to a circular iron staircase inside, which goes up to the lantern. The light originally had a ten-sided, iron lantern and an ornamental iron railing. These have disappeared, and the navigational light is now fitted with a plastic lens.

The larger, rear range light is also a cylindrical, brick structure atop a square stone pier. It is constructed of off-white brick, slightly lighter in hue than the yellow brick of the other light. The tower measures about 40 feet tall, and the original, ten-sided, iron lantern remains in place. A round-head entrance in the base and a circular iron staircase leads to the lantern platform.

== See also ==
- Lighthouses in Michigan
