= Navassa Island Light =

Deactivated Caribbean island lighthouse

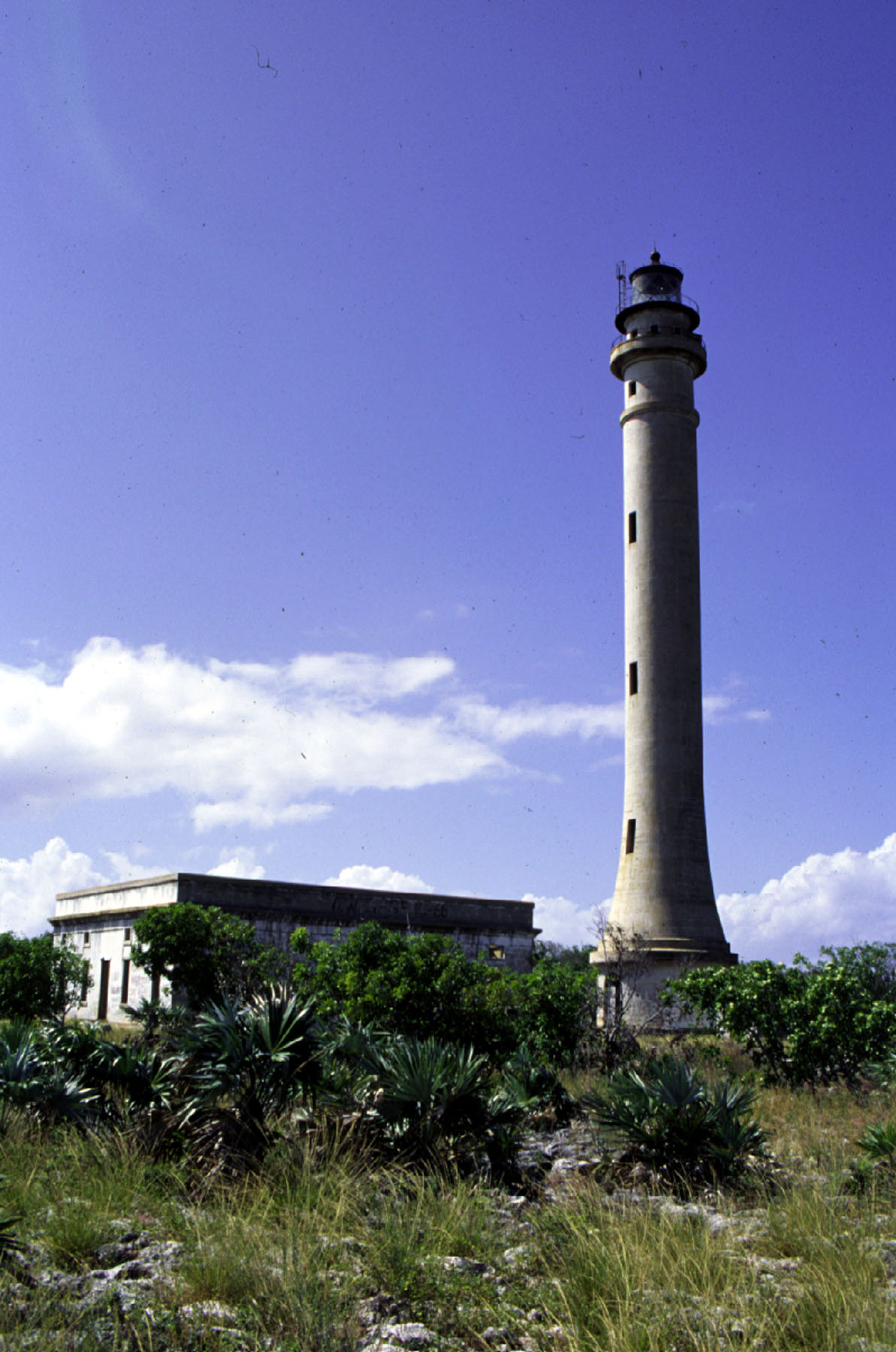
- The light in 1999
- Location: Navassa Island, Navassa Island, Haiti
- Coordinates: 18°23′51″N 75°00′46″W

Tower
- Constructed: 1917
- Construction: stone (foundation), concrete (tower)
- Automated: 1929
- Height: 162 ft (49 m)
- Shape: truncated cone
- Markings: Unpainted (tower), black (lantern)
- Operator: United States Fish and Wildlife Service

Light
- Deactivated: 1996
- Focal height: 395 ft (120 m)
- Lens: second order Fresnel lens

Navassa Island Light is a deactivated lighthouse on Navassa Island, which lies in the Caribbean Sea at the south end of the Windward Passage between the islands of Hispaniola (Haiti and the Dominican Republic) to the east and Cuba and Jamaica to the west. It is on the shortest route between the east coast of the United States and the Panama Canal. The light was built in 1917 and deactivated in 1996. The light is gradually deteriorating from lack of maintenance. The keepers' house is roofless and in ruins.

== History ==
In 1905, the U.S. Lighthouse Service identified Navassa Island as a good location for a new lighthouse. However, plans for the light moved slowly. With the opening of the Panama Canal in 1914, shipping between the American eastern seaboard and the Canal through the Windward Passage between Cuba and Haiti increased in the area of Navassa, which proved a hazard to navigation. Congress appropriated $125,000 in 1913 to build a lighthouse on Navassa, and in 1917 the Lighthouse Service built the 162-foot (49-meter) Navassa Island Light on the island, 395 feet (120 meters) above sea level. At the same time, a wireless telegraphy station was established on the island. A keeper and two assistants were assigned to live there until the Lighthouse Service installed an automatic beacon in 1929.

After absorbing the Lighthouse Service in 1939, the U.S. Coast Guard serviced the light twice each year. The U.S. Navy set up an observation post for the duration of World War II.

In 1996, the Coast Guard dismantled the light on Navassa, which ended its interest in the island. Consequently, the Department of the Interior assumed responsibility for the civil administration of the area, and placed the island under its Office of Insular Affairs.

The importance of the light before the advent of GPS is evident in the fact that it has the twelfth-highest tower and fourth-highest focal plane of all U.S. lights.

== See also ==
- List of lighthouses in the United States
