= Point Retreat Light =

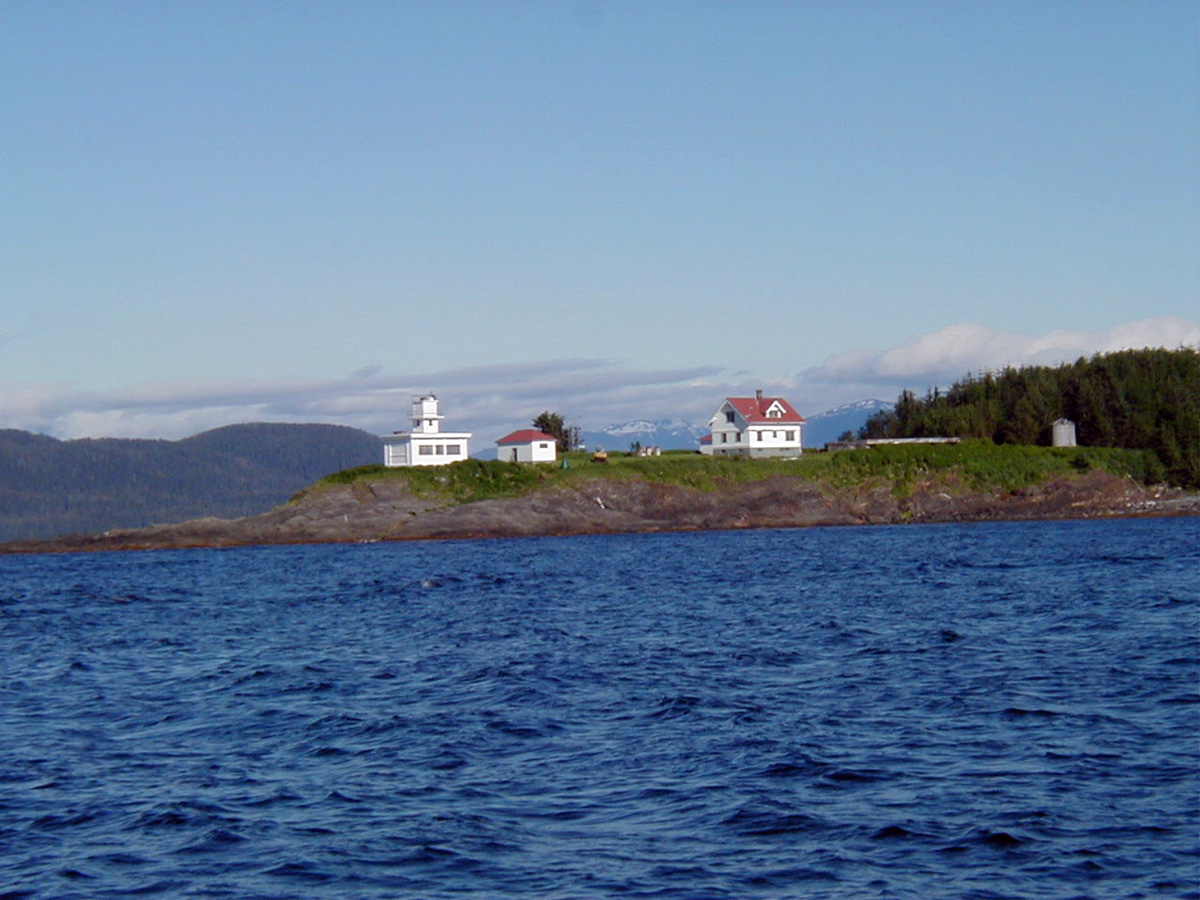
- Point Retreat Light Station in 2001
- Location: Admiralty Island; Lynn Canal; Alaska; United States
- Coordinates: 58°24′41″N 134°57′18″W

Tower
- Constructed: 1904 (first)
- Foundation: concrete
- Construction: reinforced concrete tower
- Automated: 1973
- Height: 25 feet (7.6 m)
- Shape: square tower with balcony and lantern on fog signal building
- Markings: art deco archirecture, white tower, black lantern
- Power source: solar power
- Operator: United States Coast Guard
- Heritage: National Register of Historic Places listed place

Light
- First lit: 1923
- Focal height: 63 feet (19 m)
- Lens: First order bivalve Fresnel lens (original), 300 mm lens (current)
- Range: 9 nautical miles (17 km; 10 mi)
- Characteristic: Fl W 6s.
- Point Retreat Light Station
- U.S. National Register of Historic Places
- U.S. Historic district
- Alaska Heritage Resources Survey
- Nearest city: Juneau, Alaska
- Area: 1 acre (0.40 ha)
- Built: 1924
- Architect: U.S. Lighthouse Service
- Architectural style: Moderne
- MPS: Light Stations of the United States MPS
- NRHP reference No.: 03000529
- AHRS No.: JUN-00084
- Added to NRHP: June 19, 2003

Point Retreat Light is a lighthouse located on the Mansfield Peninsula at the northern tip of Admiralty Island in southeastern Alaska, United States. It provides aid in navigation through the Lynn Canal.

== Naming ==
Point Retreat was named by Joseph Whidbey on July 19, 1794, because of his need to retreat from local Tlingit.

== History ==
Point Retreat was set aside as a 1,505-acre (609 ha) lighthouse reserve in 1901 by executive order of President William McKinley, but the point had to wait for its lighthouse due to inadequate funding. Point Retreat was first lit in 1904 and displayed a fixed white light. The first Point Retreat Lighthouse was a six-foot-tall hexagonal wooden tower, topped by a hexagonal lantern room. In 1917, Point Retreat was stripped of its personnel and downgraded to a minor light until 1924, when a new combination lighthouse and fog signal was built. The lantern was removed in the 1950s and a solar-powered 300 mm lens was installed on a post attached to the tower. In 1973 the light was again unmanned and downgraded to a minor light again.

In 2003 the light was added to the National Register of Historic Places.

== Gallery ==
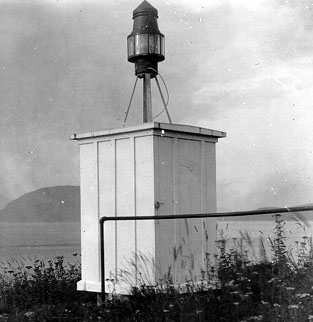
USCG archive photo

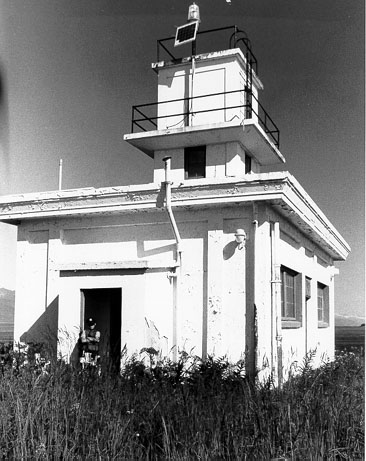
without lantern – USCG archive photo

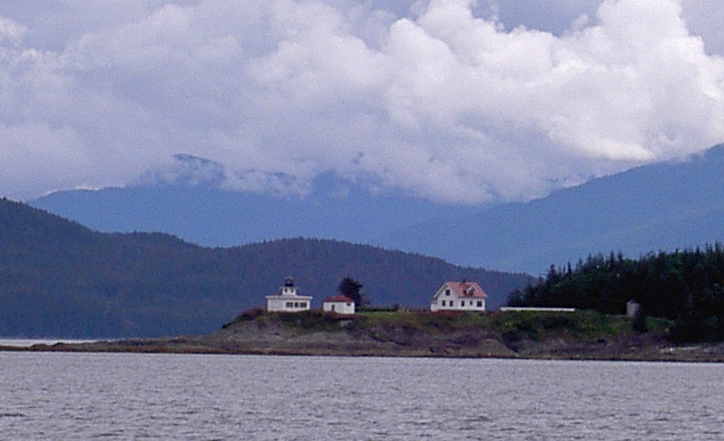
in 2011

== See also ==
- List of lighthouses in the United States
- National Register of Historic Places listings in Juneau, Alaska
