= Guard Island Light =

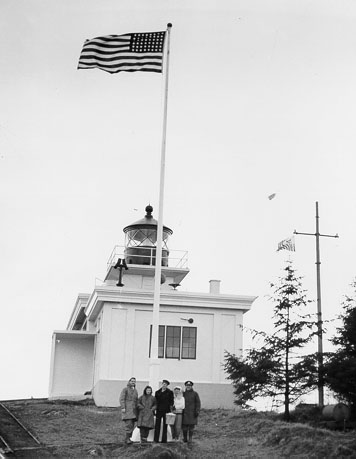
- Guard Island Light
- Location: Guard Island; Tongass Narrows entrance Clarence Strait; Alaska; United States
- Coordinates: 55°26′46″N 131°52′52″W

Tower
- Constructed: 1904 (first)
- Foundation: Concrete
- Construction: Reinforced concrete
- Automated: 1969
- Height: 30 feet (9.1 m)
- Shape: Square tower with balcony and lantern on oil house
- Markings: White tower, black lantern
- Operator: United States Coast Guard
- Heritage: National Register of Historic Places listed place

Light
- First lit: 1924 (current)
- Focal height: 74 feet (23 m)
- Lens: Fourth Order Fresnel lens
- Range: 17 nautical miles (31 km; 20 mi)
- Characteristic: Fl W 10s. emergency light (Fl W 6s.) of reduced intensity when main light is extinguished.
- Guard Island Lighthouse
- U.S. National Register of Historic Places
- U.S. Historic district
- Alaska Heritage Resources Survey
- Nearest city: Ketchikan, Alaska
- Area: 10.4 acres (4.2 ha)
- Architect: J.T. Elliot
- Architectural style: Moderne
- MPS: Light Stations of the United States MPS
- NRHP reference No.: 03001378
- AHRS No.: KET-00025
- Added to NRHP: January 14, 2004

The Guard Island Light is a lighthouse on a small island near the entrance to the Tongass Narrows, in Clarence Strait in southeastern Alaska. The western entrance to the Behm Canal also lies nearby.

== History ==
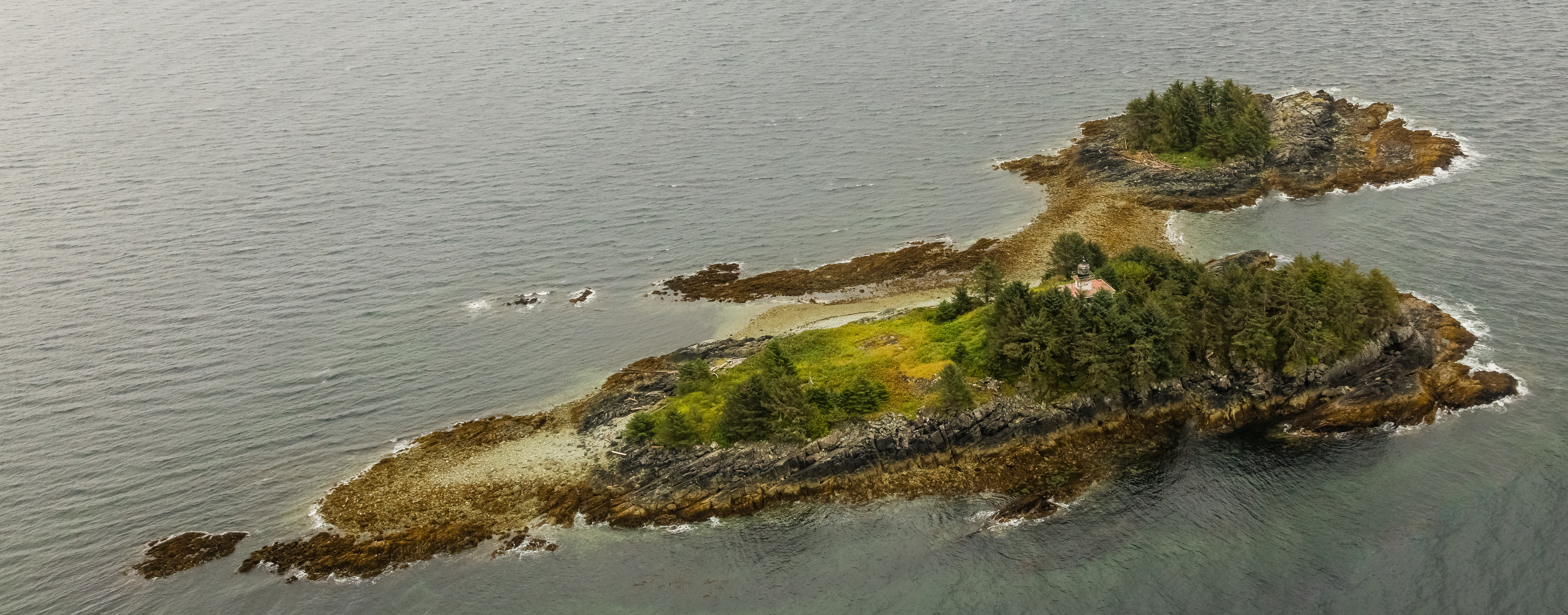
Aerial view

The lighthouse location was prioritized sixth in a 1901 study of 15 Alaska proposed sites. It would assist shipping along Southeast Alaska's Inside Passage, at the north end of the Tongass Narrows, "one of the more difficult passages along the route" of Klondike Gold Rush-related shipping to Juneau and to Skagway.

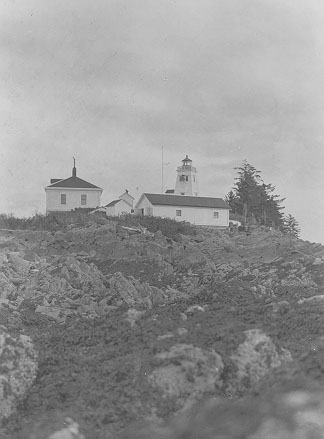
Original 1904 lighthouse – USCG archive photo

Construction of the Guard Island Lighthouse began in the summer of 1903 and was completed by September 1904. The 34-foot (10 m) wooden tower housed a fourth order Fresnel lens that produced a fixed white light. However, the wood used for Guard Island Light Station, as well as for several other Alaskan lighthouses, soon deteriorated in the harsh weather conditions. By the 1920s, all the lighthouses except Eldred Rock were falling apart, and in 1922, Congress authorized the reconstruction of Guard Island Light. In 1924, the dilapidated light tower was replaced with a new single-story rectangular tower of reinforced concrete. The station was automated by the Coast Guard in 1969.

The lighthouse was listed as a historic district on the National Register of Historic Places in 2004. The listing includes one contributing building, one contributing structure, and one contributing site on a 10.4-acre (4.2 ha) area.

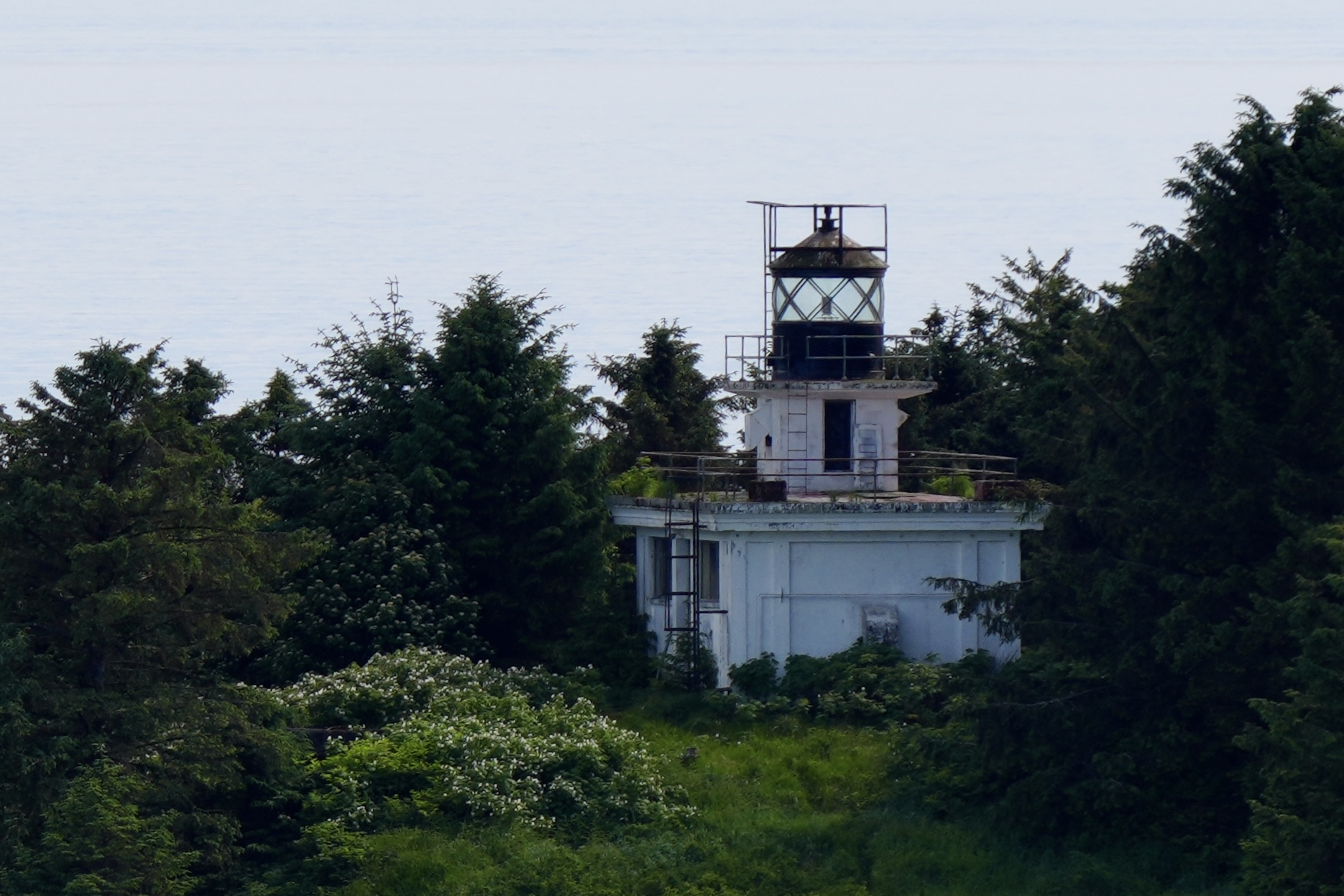
Guard Island Lighthouse in June of 2022

== See also ==
- List of lighthouses in the United States
- National Register of Historic Places listings in Ketchikan Gateway Borough, Alaska
