= Cape Sarichef Light =

Lighthouse in Alaska, United States

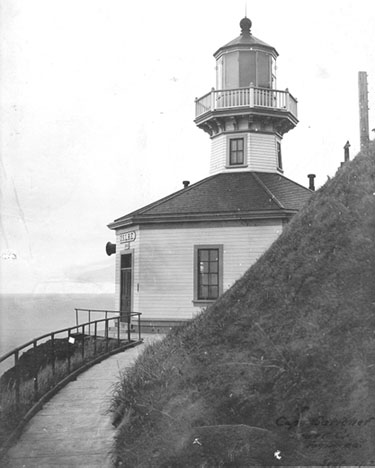
- Original 1904 Cape Sarichef lighthouse (USCG)
- Location: Cape Sarichef; Unimak Island; Alaska; United States
- Coordinates: 54°35′53.68″N 164°55′39.38″W

Tower
- Constructed: 1979 (current)
- Construction: wooden tower (first) reinforced concrete tower (second) metal skeletal tower (current)
- Automated: 1979
- Height: 7 metres (23 ft) (second)
- Shape: hexagonal tower centered on the keeper's house (first) hexagonal tower on fog signal building (second)
- Operator: United States Coast Guard

Light
- First lit: 1904 (first); 1950 (second)
- Deactivated: 1950 (first); 1979 (second)
- Focal height: 52 metres (171 ft) (current)
- Lens: Third order Fresnel lens (first)
- Range: 8 nautical miles (15 km; 9.2 mi)
- Characteristic: Fl W 2.5s. (obscured from 223.5° to 018.5°)

Cape Sarichef Light is a lighthouse located on the northwest tip of Unimak Island, approximately 630 miles (1,010 km) southwest of Anchorage, Alaska. The most westerly and most isolated lighthouse in North America, Cape Sarichef Light marks the northwest end of Unimak Pass, the main passage through the Aleutian Islands between the Bering Sea and the Pacific Ocean. When it was first lit on July 1, 1904, it was Alaska's second coastal lighthouse (after Scotch Cap Light), and the only staffed U.S. lighthouse on the Bering Sea. Today, the lighthouse is automated, and the beacon is mounted on a skeleton tower.

Cape Sarichef was named in 1816 by Russian explorer Otto von Kotzebue after Admiral Gavril Sarychev of the Imperial Russian Navy.

== History ==
The original lighthouse was a wood tower on an octagonal wood building, 45 feet (14 m) in height. The light was 126 feet (38 m) above the sea.

The lighthouse was known for its extreme isolation, which precluded regular resupply. From August 1912 to June 1913, the lighthouse received no supplies at all; the nearest neighbor was a trapper some 10 miles (16 km) away. Although living quarters were originally provided for keepers' families, the Lighthouse Board prohibited civilian keepers from bringing their families because of the site's isolation. Mail and supplies were not received for months at a time. The station shut down from December 1 through March 1 because the Bering Sea was frozen. Due to the privations they endured, civilian keepers got one full year off every 4 years of service. Circa 1933, one of the assistant keepers suffered a breakdown after two years at the lonely station.

Following the disastrous tsunami in 1946 that destroyed Scotch Cap Light and killed its 5-man crew, the Coast Guard razed and rebuilt Cape Sarichef Light in 1950. The upgrade included a LORAN radiobeacon to help ships and aircraft obtain an accurate position. A crew of 21 men each served a one-year tour of duty at the station. Approximately 2 miles (3.2 km) from the station was an Air Force DEW (Distant Early Warning) Line radar station crewed by 25 men. Relations between the two services were reportedly very good, with a lot of swapping of everything from food to vehicle parts.

The station was automated in 1979. The new light was erected on a steel skeleton next to the old tower. The old light, fog horn and radiobeacon were turned off. The Coast Guard turned the property over to the Fish and Wildlife Service. The old tower and buildings were demolished in 1999.

== Climate ==
Climate data for Cape Sarichef Light, Alaska
Month	Jan	Feb	Mar	Apr	May	Jun	Jul	Aug	Sep	Oct	Nov	Dec	Year
Record high °F (°C)	57 (14)	58 (14)	58 (14)	58 (14)	59 (15)	70 (21)	74 (23)	74 (23)	72 (22)	62 (17)	58 (14)	69 (21)	74 (23)
Mean daily maximum °F (°C)	35.4 (1.9)	34.4 (1.3)	36.4 (2.4)	37.9 (3.3)	42.9 (6.1)	47.9 (8.8)	52.1 (11.2)	53.6 (12.0)	50.3 (10.2)	44.0 (6.7)	40.3 (4.6)	36.3 (2.4)	42.6 (5.9)
Daily mean °F (°C)	31.4 (−0.3)	30.1 (−1.1)	31.6 (−0.2)	33.8 (1.0)	38.8 (3.8)	43.8 (6.6)	48.0 (8.9)	49.4 (9.7)	46.7 (8.2)	40.3 (4.6)	36.5 (2.5)	32.3 (0.2)	38.6 (3.7)
Mean daily minimum °F (°C)	27.3 (−2.6)	25.8 (−3.4)	26.7 (−2.9)	29.7 (−1.3)	34.7 (1.5)	39.6 (4.2)	43.8 (6.6)	45.2 (7.3)	43.0 (6.1)	36.6 (2.6)	32.7 (0.4)	28.2 (−2.1)	34.4 (1.4)
Record low °F (°C)	5 (−15)	−1 (−18)	−5 (−21)	13 (−11)	14 (−10)	22 (−6)	25 (−4)	28 (−2)	25 (−4)	20 (−7)	13 (−11)	3 (−16)	−5 (−21)
Average precipitation inches (mm)	2.14 (54)	2.07 (53)	1.77 (45)	1.39 (35)	1.52 (39)	1.90 (48)	2.68 (68)	2.93 (74)	3.57 (91)	3.62 (92)	3.05 (77)	2.06 (52)	28.69 (729)
Average snowfall inches (cm)	7.2 (18)	8.3 (21)	6.1 (15)	1.7 (4.3)	0.2 (0.51)	1.4 (3.6)	0.0 (0.0)	0.1 (0.25)	0.0 (0.0)	0.7 (1.8)	2.5 (6.4)	7.2 (18)	33.9 (86)

== See also ==
- List of lighthouses in the United States
