= Catherine Island (Alaska) =

Island in the United States of America

Coordinates: 57°22′34″N 134°53′45″W

Catherine Island (Russian: остров Катрин) is an island in the Alexander Archipelago of southeastern Alaska, United States. It is part of the City and Borough of Sitka and lies just off the northeast corner of Baranof Island, separated from it by Portage Arm. The U.S. Forest Service named Catherine Island in 1935 after Catherine I of Russia. Catherine Island has a land area of 86.936 km^{2} (33.566 sq mi) and no resident population.
