= Five Finger Islands Light =

Lighthouse in Alaska, United States

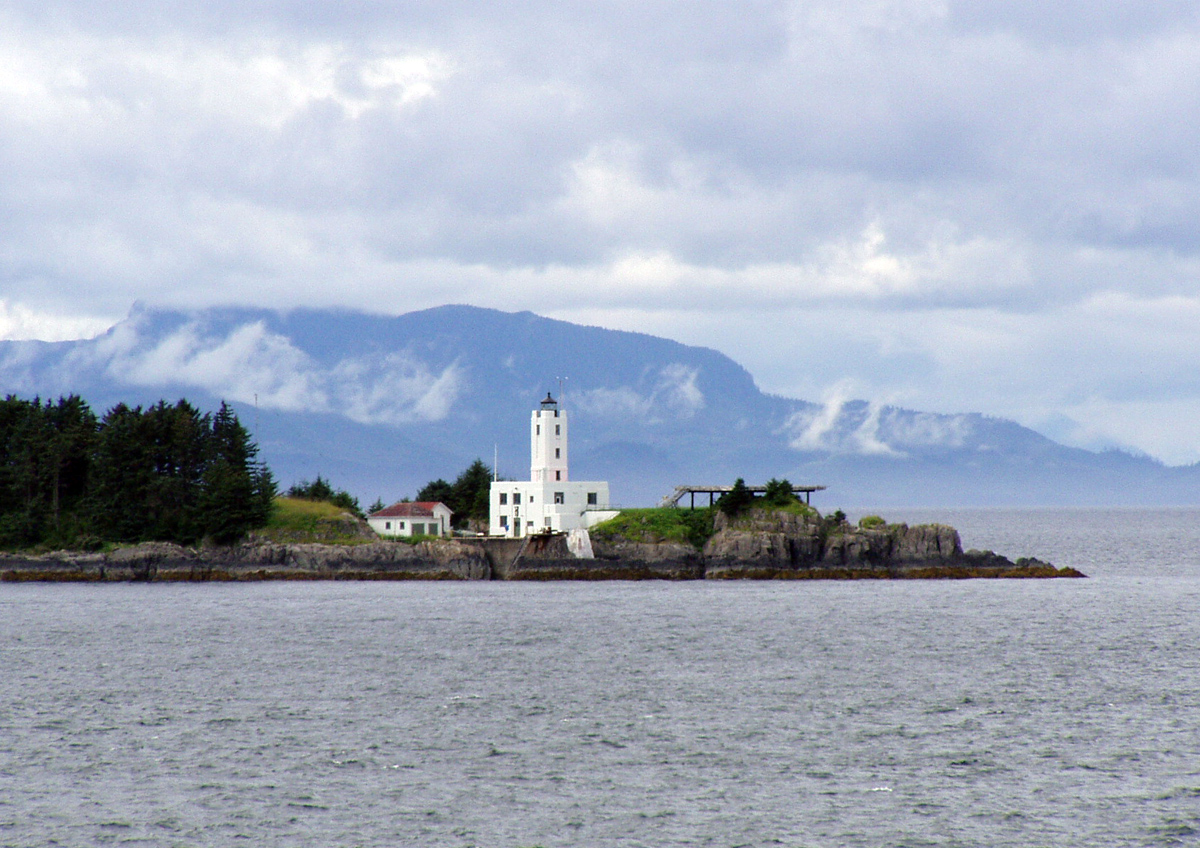
- Five Finger Islands Light in 2003
- Location: The Five Finger southernmost island Frederick Sound; Alaska; United States
- Coordinates: 57°16′13″N 133°37′54″W

Tower
- Constructed: 1902 (first)
- Foundation: concrete pier
- Construction: reinforced concrete tower
- Automated: 1984
- Height: 68 feet (21 m)
- Shape: square tower with lantern centered on the roof of keeper's house
- Markings: art deco architecture white tower, black lantern
- Operator: Juneau Lighthouse Association
- Heritage: National Register of Historic Places listed place

Light
- First lit: 1935 (current)
- Focal height: 81 feet (25 m)
- Lens: Fourth order Fresnel lens
- Range: 18 nautical miles (33 km; 21 mi)
- Characteristic: Fl W 10s. emergency light Fl W 6s of reduced intensity when main light is extinguished
- Five Finger Light Station
- U.S. National Register of Historic Places
- U.S. Historic district
- Alaska Heritage Resources Survey
- Nearest city: Petersburg, Alaska
- Area: less than one acre
- Architect: U.S. Lighthouse Service; U.S. Lighthouse Board
- Architectural style: Modern Movement, Art Deco
- MPS: Light Stations of the United States MPS
- NRHP reference No.: 04000416
- AHRS No.: SUM-00009
- Added to NRHP: May 12, 2004

The Five Finger Islands Light is a lighthouse located on a small island that lies between Stephens Passage and Frederick Sound in southeastern Alaska. It and Sentinel Island Light Station were the first U.S. government lighthouses opened in Alaska, first lit on March 21, 1902.

It became the last lighthouse in Alaska to be automated on August 14, 1984.

== History ==
In 1901, a contract of $22,500 was awarded to construct a lighthouse on the southernmost of the Five Finger Islands. Completed in 1902, it was a rectangular lighthouse with a square tower, elevated several feet above the surrounding hipped roof. Atop the tower sat a lantern room from which a fourth-order Fresnel lens produced a fixed beam of white light at a focal plane of 68 feet (21 m). The original structure burned down in December 1933. The tower was rebuilt using public works appropriations. The current structure is made of concrete, which was completed and relit in 1935. It was automated by the United States Coast Guard in 1984.

It was listed on the National Register of Historic Places as Five Finger Light Station in 2004. The listing was as a historic district including four contributing buildings and one other contributing structure.

The original lighthouse burned. The replacement, built in 1935, "is a good example of Modern Movement architecture, popular in the 1930s for concrete buildings, and adapted by the U.S. Lighthouse Service as the agency replaced the original wood frame lighthouse buildings at many of its sixteen staffed stations in Alaska."

The light station was listed on the National Register of Historic Places in 2004.

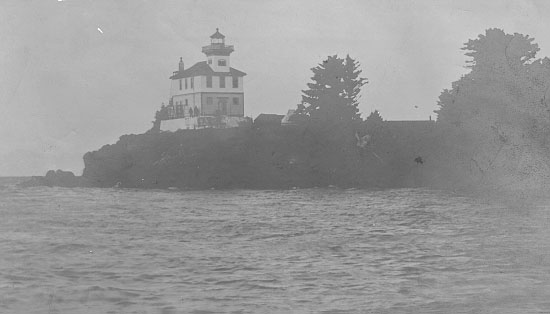
Original 1902 Lighthouse – USCG archive photo

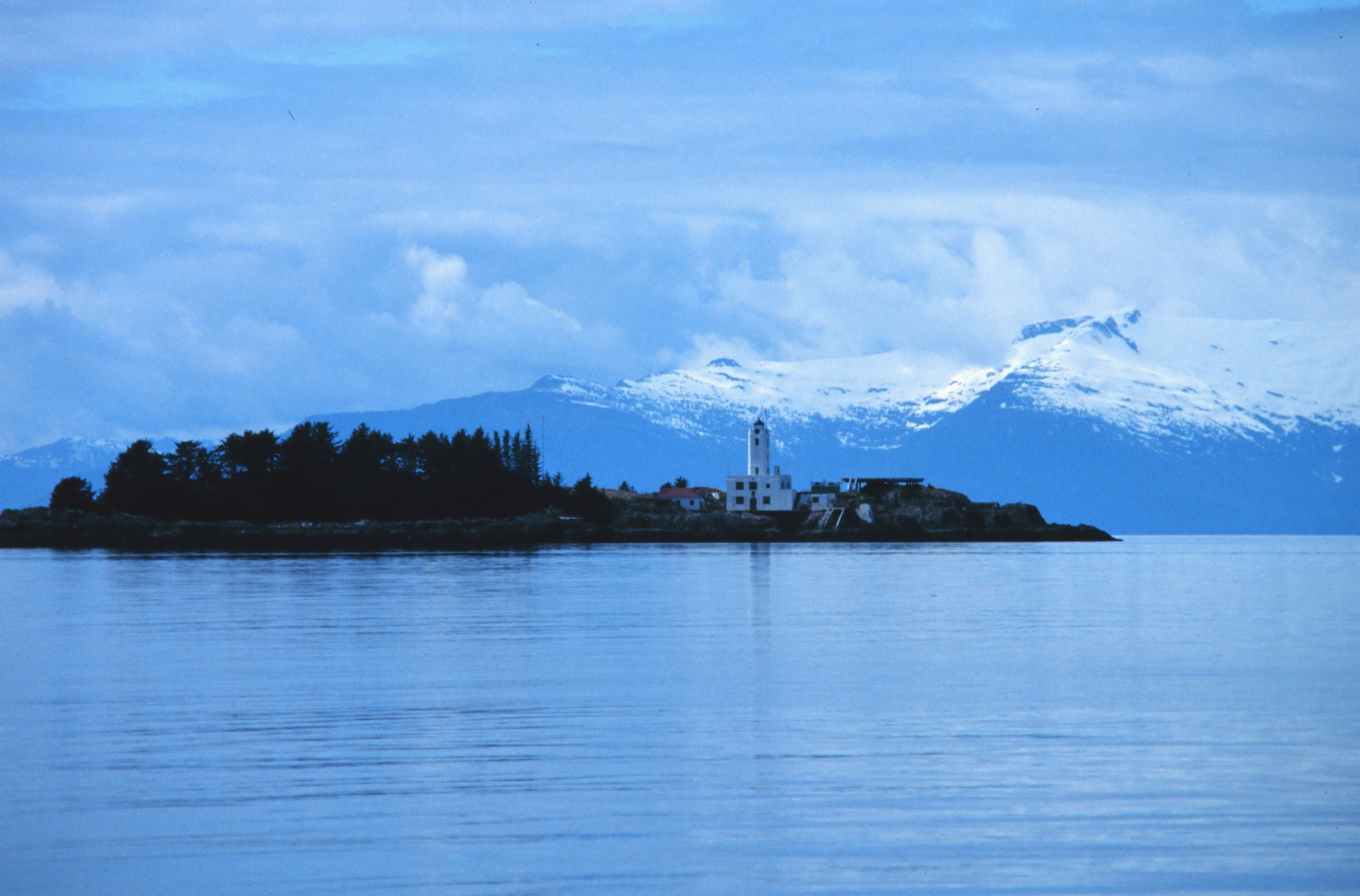
1992

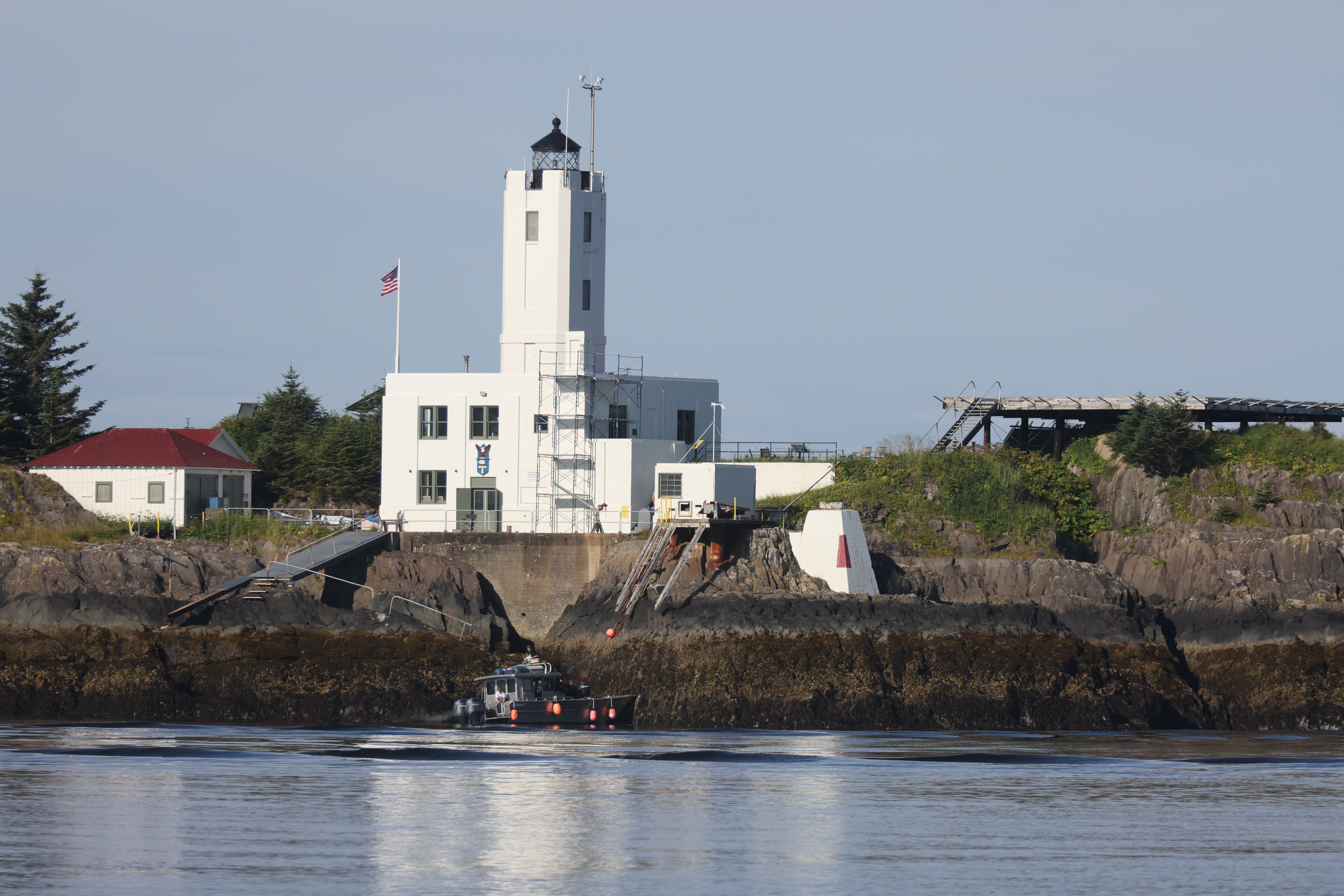
2025

== See also ==
- List of lighthouses in the United States
