= Mary Island Light =

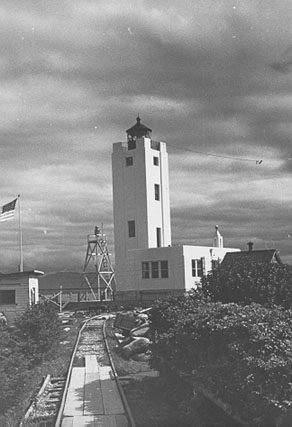
- Mary Island Light in 1937
- Location: Mary Island; Revillagigedo Channel; Alaska; United States
- Coordinates: 55°5′56″N 131°10′58″W

Tower
- Constructed: 1903 (first)
- Foundation: concrete
- Construction: reinforced concrete
- Automated: 1969
- Height: 61 feet (19 m)
- Shape: square tower at corner of dwelling
- Markings: art deco architecture white tower
- Operator: United States Coast Guard
- Heritage: National Register of Historic Places listed place

Light
- First lit: 1937 (current)
- Focal height: 76 feet (23 m)
- Lens: Fourth order Fresnel lens (original), 250 mm lens (current)
- Range: 6 nautical miles (11 km; 6.9 mi)
- Characteristic: Fl W 6s. obscured from 341° to 150°.
- Mary Island Light Station
- U.S. National Register of Historic Places
- Alaska Heritage Resources Survey
- Nearest city: Ketchikan, Alaska
- Area: 9.8 acres (4.0 ha)
- Built: 1937
- Architects: US Lighthouse Service; D.A. Chase; Edwin Laird
- Architectural style: Moderne
- MPS: Light Stations of the United States MPS
- NRHP reference No.: 05000645
- AHRS No.: KET-024
- Added to NRHP: July 8, 2005

The Mary Island Light Station is a lighthouse located on the northeastern part of Mary Island in southeastern Alaska, United States.

== History ==
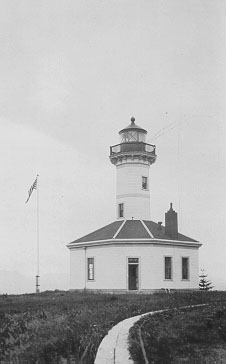
Original 1903 Lighthouse – USCG archive photo

Mary Island Light Station was opened in 1903, and was one of a series of staffed lights established by the U.S. Government to guide ships through the treacherous waters of Southeast Alaska's Inside Passage. In 1937, a concrete lighthouse and fog signal building replaced the original wood tower. Situated behind the light were two lightkeeper houses which housed the Coast Guard Lightkeepers. One of the houses burned down in 1965(?); the other house was moved off the island to nearby Ketchikan, Alaska.

In 1969 the station was automated and the radio beacon was removed. No other buildings and structures at the station stand today, other than an outhouse.

It was listed on the National Register of Historic Places as Mary Island Light Station in 2005.

== See also ==
- List of lighthouses in the United States
- National Register of Historic Places listings in Ketchikan Gateway Borough, Alaska
