= Tree Point Light =

Lighthouse in southeastern Alaska, US

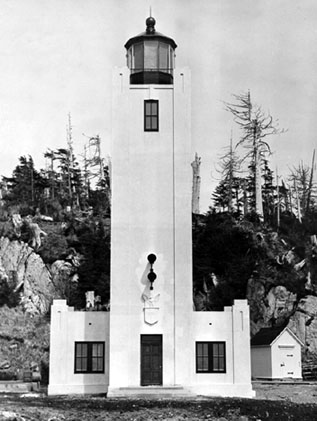
- Current lighthouse, completed in 1935
- Location: Revillagigedo Channel, Alaska
- Coordinates: 54°48′10″N 130°56′02″W

Tower
- Constructed: 1905 (first)
- Foundation: concrete
- Construction: reinforced concrete tower
- Automated: 1969
- Height: 58 feet (18 m)
- Shape: square tower with lantern attached to oil house
- Markings: art deco architecture, white tower, red lantern
- Power source: solar power
- Operator: United States Coast Guard
- Heritage: National Register of Historic Places listed place

Light
- First lit: 1935 (current)
- Focal height: 86 feet (26 m)
- Lens: Fourth order Fresnel lens (original), VRB-25 lens (current)
- Range: 9 nautical miles (17 km; 10 mi)
- Characteristic: Fl W 6s. obscured from 158° to 318°
- Tree Point Lighthouse
- U.S. National Register of Historic Places
- U.S. Historic district
- Alaska Heritage Resources Survey
- Nearest city: Ketchikan, Alaska
- Area: 76.5 acres (31.0 ha)
- Built: 1935
- Architect: U.S. Lighthouse Service; D.A. Chase; Edwin Laird
- Architectural style: Art Deco, Classical Revival, et al.
- MPS: Light Stations of the United States MPS
- NRHP reference No.: 04001177
- AHRS No.: XPR-006
- Added to NRHP: October 27, 2004

The Tree Point Light is a lighthouse located adjacent to Revillagigedo Channel in Southeast Alaska, United States. It is located near the southernmost point of mainland Alaska.

== History ==
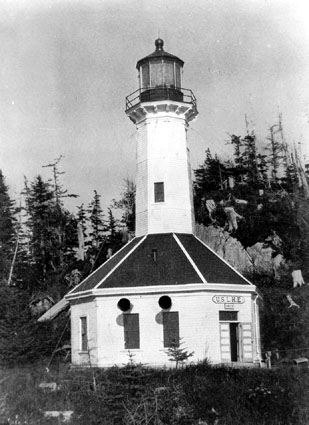
Original 1904 Lighthouse – USCG archive photo

The Lighthouse Board approved the construction of the Tree Point Lighthouse on April 24, 1903, and just over a year later the light was activated on April 30, 1904. The lighthouse was the first, and only lighthouse, to be built on mainland Alaska. In the early 1930s, the Bureau of Lighthouses authorized reconstruction of the station with reinforced concrete. Work began in 1933 and was completed in 1935. The 1935 lighthouse was equipped with a fourth-order Fresnel lens, which is now displayed at the Tongass Historical Museum in Ketchikan, Alaska. In 1969 it was automated. The Fresnel lens was replaced with a lens mounted outside the lantern room. In the summer of 1977 the lens on the gallery was replaced with a modern, solar-powered VRB-25 Vega lens placed back inside the lantern room.

The lighthouse was listed on the National Register of Historic Places as an historic district in 2004. Its 2003 NRHP nomination stated that it was "the most intact [lighthouse] outpost in the southern section of Southeast Alaska. The listing includes the concrete light and fog-signal building built in 1935, one standing keeper residence, the two original oil houses, the later-period boathouse, and features of the water supply system. In addition, the tramway run is relatively intact." Additional features of a derrick and winch were deemed non-contributing, because they are relatively recent replacements.

== See also ==
- List of lighthouses in the United States
- National Register of Historic Places listings in Ketchikan Gateway Borough, Alaska
