= Revillagigedo Channel =

Ocean channel in Alexander Archipelago, Alaska, US

Coordinates: 55°3′40″N 131°6′54″W

Revillagigedo Channel (Spanish: [reˈβiʝa xiˈxeðo], English: /rɛˌvijəhiˈheɪðoʊ/ rheh-vee-yə-hee-HAY-dhoh, locally Revilla, /rəˈvɪlə/) is an ocean channel in the Alexander Archipelago of the U.S. state of Alaska. Extending 56 km (35 mi) northwest from the Dixon Entrance, it lies between the mainland to the east, Revillagigedo Island to the north, and Duke Island and Annette Island to the southwest. It is part of the Inside Passage to Ketchikan.

The channel was named for Juan Vicente de Güemes, 2nd Count of Revillagigedo, viceroy of New Spain, in 1793.

The Tree Point Light is an important aid to navigation in Revillagigedo Channel.
