= List of lighthouses in the United States =

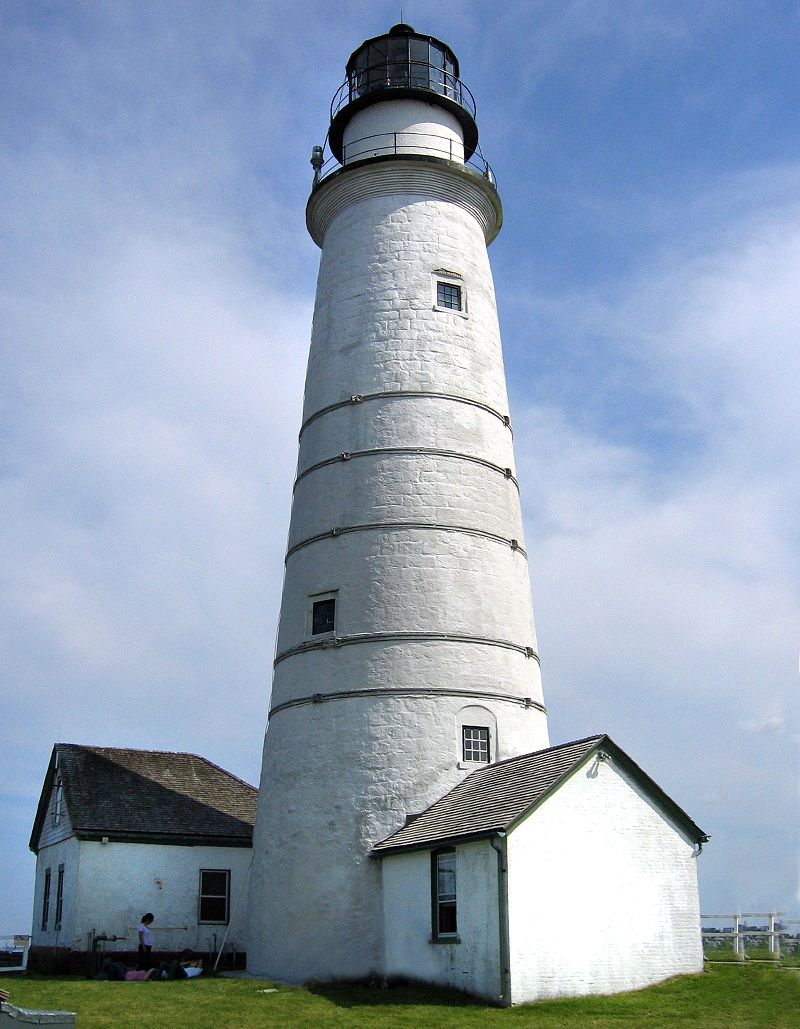
Boston Light, the oldest light station and second oldest lighthouse structure in the US

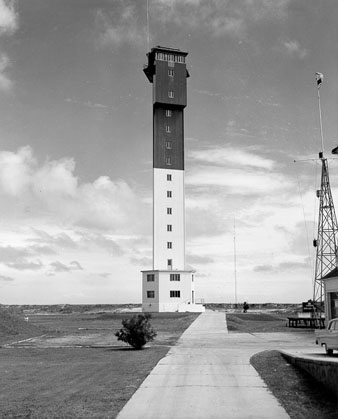
Charleston Light, the last manned lighthouse built on shore in the United States

This is a list of lighthouses in the United States. The United States has had approximately a thousand lights as well as light towers, range lights, and pier head lights. Michigan has the most lights of any state with over 150 past and present lights. Lighthouses that are in former U.S. territories are not listed here.

Most of the lights in the United States have been built and maintained by the Coast Guard (since 1939) and its predecessors, the United States Lighthouse Service (1910–1939) and the United States Lighthouse Board (1852–1910). Before the Lighthouse Board was established, local collectors of customs were responsible for lighthouses under Stephen Pleasonton. As their importance to navigation has declined and as public interest in them has increased, the Coast Guard has been handing over ownership and in some cases responsibility for running them to other parties, the chief of them being the National Park Service under the National Historic Lighthouse Preservation Act of 2000.

- Note: Click on the state of your choice in the tables below to link you to lighthouses in that state.

== New England ==
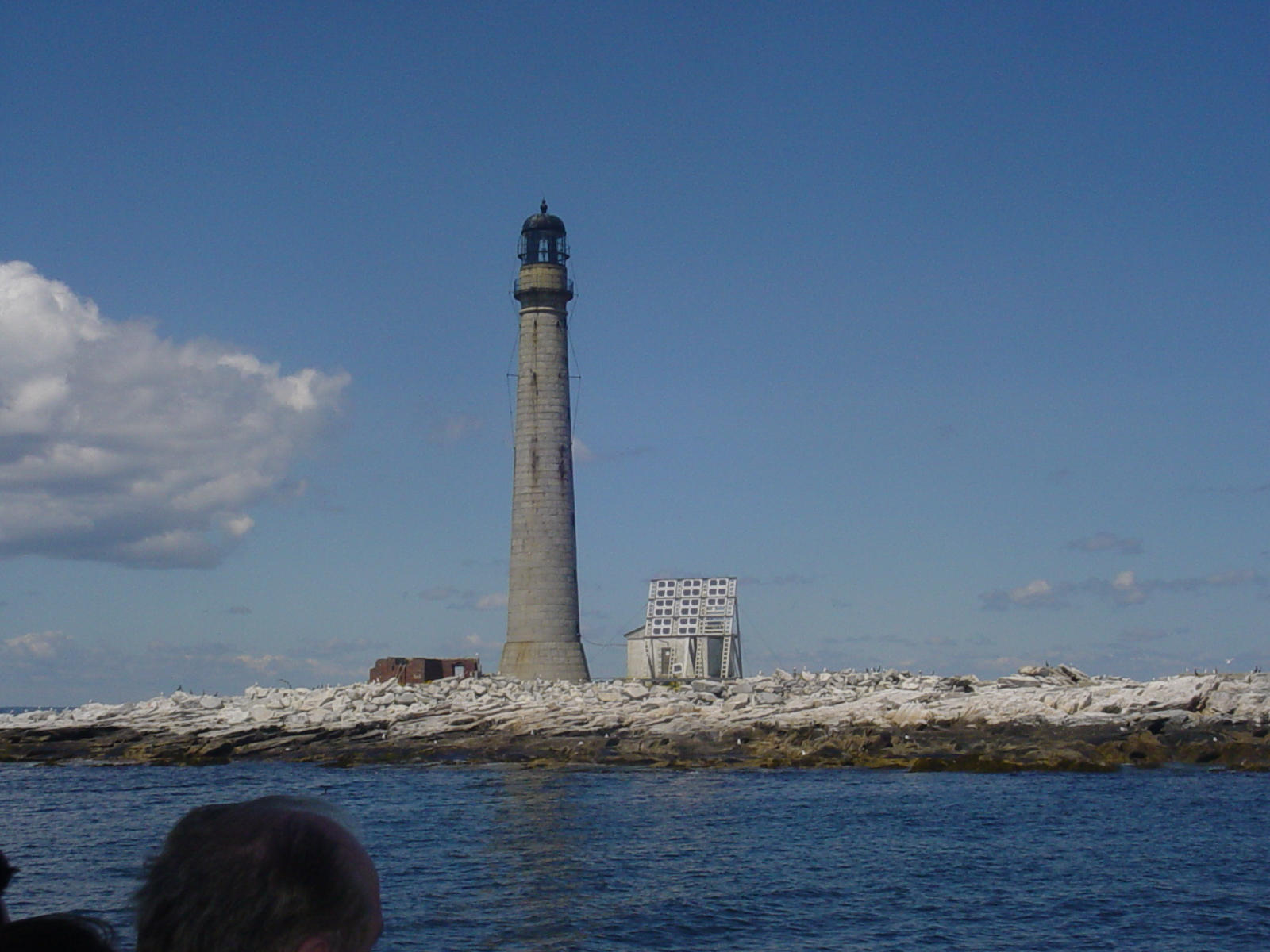
Boon Island Light in Maine is the tallest in New England.

State	Tallest (H)	Shortest (H)	Oldest (currently standing)
Maine	Boon Island Light; 133 ft (41 m)	Pond Island Light; 20 ft (6.1 m)	Portland Head Light (1791)
Massachusetts	Cape Ann Light; 124 ft (38 m)	Disputed^{A}	Boston Light (1783)
New Hampshire	Isles of Shoals Light; 58 ft (18 m)	Portsmouth Harbor Light; 48 ft (15 m)	Isles of Shoals Light (1859)
Rhode Island	Sakonnet Light; 66 ft (20 m)	Ida Lewis Rock Light; 13 ft (4.0 m)	Poplar Point Light (1831)
Connecticut	New London Harbor Light; 89 ft (27 m)	Mystic Seaport Light; 25 ft (7.6 m)	New London Harbor Light (1801)
Vermont	Windmill Point Light; 40 ft (12 m)	Whipple Point Light; 13 ft (4.0 m)	Juniper Island Light (1846)

=== New Hampshire ===
The state of New Hampshire only has two lighthouses, both of which are located along the Atlantic coastline.

Name	Image	Location	Coordinates	Year first lit	Automated	Year deactivated	Current lens	Focal height
Isles of Shoals Light		Isles of Shoals	42°58′02″N 70°37′23″W	1859	1987	Active	VLB-44 LED unit	82 ft (25 m)
Portsmouth Harbor Light		New Castle	43°04′15″N 70°42′30″W	1878	1960	Active	Fourth order Fresnel	48 ft (15 m)

=== Vermont ===
- Note: All entries here show the current tower's status; more details can be found in the lighthouse articles.

Name	Image	Location	Coordinates	Year first lit	Automated	Year deactivated	Current lens	Focal height
Burlington Breakwater North Light		Burlington	44°28′50″N 73°13′47.2″W	1857 (original); 2003 (current)	2003 (replica)	Active	Unknown	35 ft (11 m)
Burlington Breakwater South Light		Burlington	44°28′12.1″N 73°13′32.4″W	1857 (original); 2003 (current)	2003 (replica)	Active	Unknown	12 ft (3.7 m)
Colchester Reef Light		Shelburne	44.3753°N 73.2314°W	1871	Never	1933	None	35 ft (11 m)
Isle La Motte Light		Isle La Motte	44.9065°N 73.3435°W	1856 (original); 1881 (current)	Unknown	Unknown	300mm	25 ft (7.6 m)
Juniper Island Light		South Burlington	44.4500°N 73.2763°W	1826 (original); 1846 (current)	Never	1954	None	25 ft (7.6 m)
Maxfield Point Light	—N/a	Orleans	Unknown	1879	Unknown	Unknown	None	40 ft (12 m)
Newport Wharf Light	—N/a	Orleans	Unknown	1879	Unknown	Unknown	None	37 ft (11 m)
Windmill Point Light		Isle La Motte	44.9818°N 73.3418°W	1830 (iriginal); 1858 (current)	Unknown	Active (inactive: 1931–2002)	300 mm	40 ft (12 m)
Whipple Point Light	—N/a	Orleans	Unknown	1879	Unknown	1906	None	25 ft (7.6 m)

== Mid-Atlantic ==
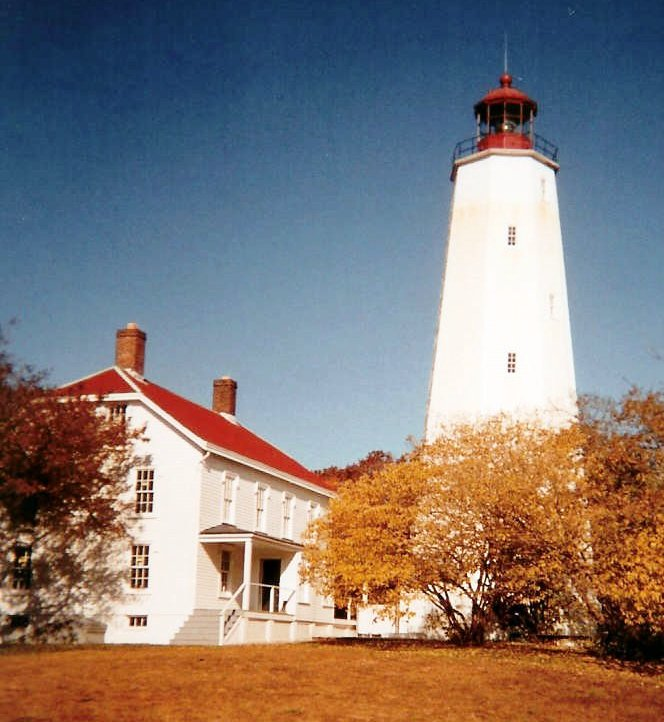
Sandy Hook Lighthouse is the oldest still standing in the United States.

State	Tallest (H)	Shortest (H)	Oldest (currently standing)
New York	Fire Island Lighthouse; 168 ft (51 m)^{B}	Cape Vincent Light; 15 ft (4.6 m)	Montauk Point Light (1797)
New Jersey	Absecon Light; 171 ft (52 m)	Ludlam's Beach Light; 36 ft (11 m)	Sandy Hook Light (1764)
Pennsylvania	Presque Isle Light; 68 ft (21 m)	Turtle Rock Light; 30 ft (9.1 m)	Erie Harbor Light (1857)
Delaware	Liston Range Rear Light; 120 ft (37 m)	Cherry Island Light; 35 ft (11 m)	Fenwick Island Light (1858)
Maryland	Craighill Channel L.R.R. 105 ft (32 m)	Craighill Channel U.R.F. 15 ft (4.6 m)	Pooles Island Light (1825)

== Midwest ==
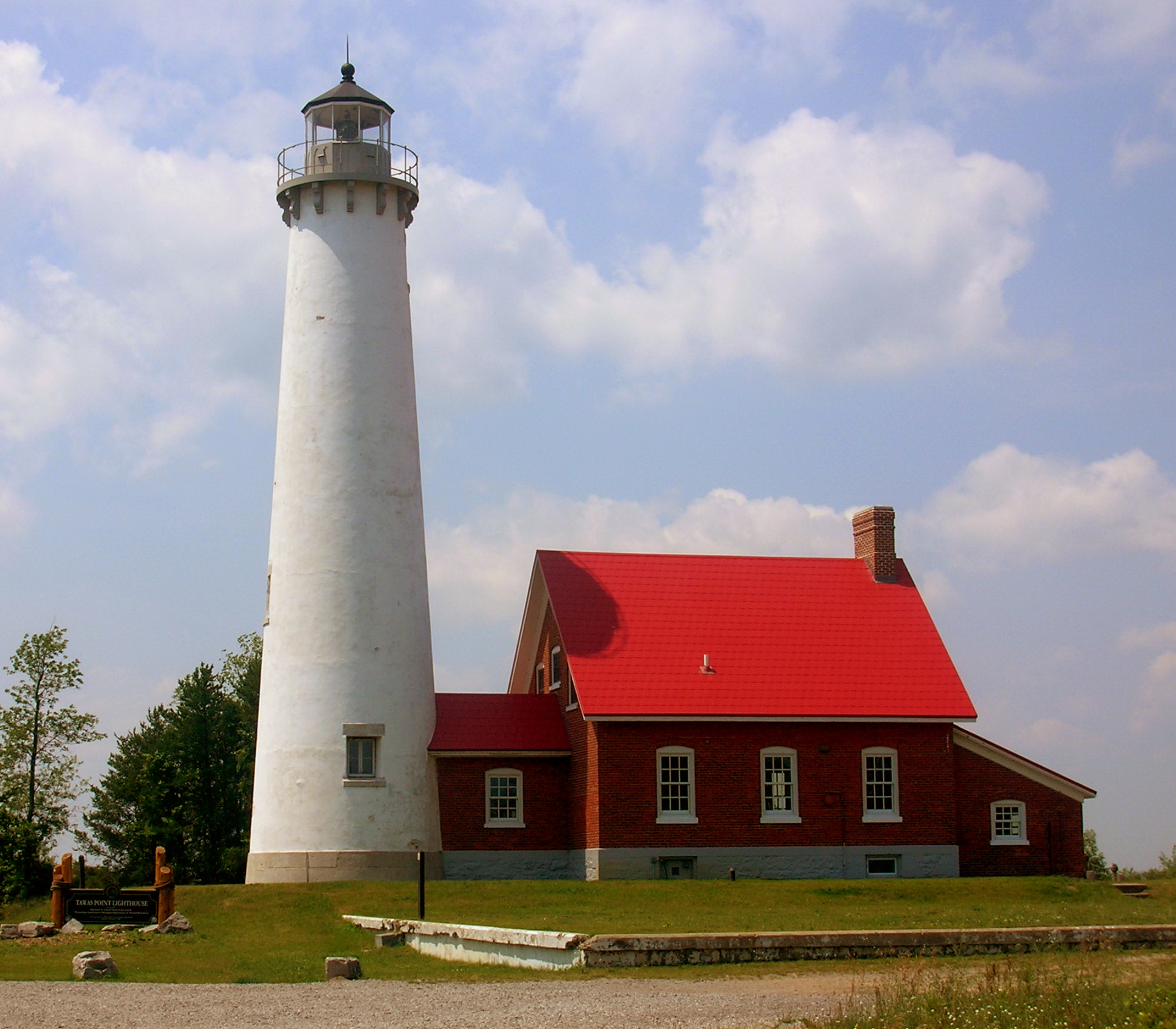
Michigan has more lighthouses (still standing) than any other state with over 120 listed. Including historical lighthouses, there were 150 built. (Tawas Point Light is shown here.)

State	Tallest (H)	Shortest (H)	Oldest (currently standing)
Illinois	Grosse Point Light; 113 ft (34 m)	Waukegan Harbor Light; 35 ft (11 m)	Grosse Point Light (1873)
Indiana	Buffington Breakwater Light; 55 ft (17 m)	Gary Breakwater Light; 30 ft (9.1 m)	Old Michigan City Light (1858)
Michigan	White Shoal Light; 121 ft (37 m)	Cheboygan Crib Light; 25 ft (7.6 m)	Fort Gratiot Light (1825)
Minnesota	Duluth South Breakwater I.L. 70 ft (21 m)	Grand Marais Light; 34 ft (10 m)	Two Harbors Light (1892)^{C}
Nebraska	Linoma Lighthouse; 100 ft (30 m)	Lake Minatare Light; 55 ft (17 m)	—N/a
Ohio	Northwood Light; 161 ft (49 m)	Port Clinton Light; 20 ft (6.1 m)	Marblehead Light (1821)
Wisconsin	Rawley Point Light; 111 ft (34 m)	Baileys Harbor Front RL; 21 ft (6.4 m)	Baileys Harbor Light (1853)^{D}

=== Colorado ===
State	Tallest (H)	Shortest (H)	Oldest (currently standing)
Colorado	Dillon Reservoir Lighthouse; 26 ft (7.9 m)	—N/a	Dillon Reservoir Lighthouse (circa 1963)

The state of Colorado has only one lighthouse, the Dillon Reservoir Lighthouse, also known as the Lake Dillon Lighthouse. It is located in the Dillon Reservoir (also referred to as Lake Dillon) in Summit County, Colorado. Although the exact completion date of the 26-foot tall tower is unknown, it was constructed along with the reservoir itself, which was completed in 1963. The lake is at an elevation of 9017 ft (2748 m), making this the highest elevation lighthouse in the U.S.

=== Nebraska ===
The state of Nebraska has at least two faux lighthouses which were first lit in 1939. There is no evidence that either were used for navigational purposes as the state has no large bodies of water that would require the need. Linoma Lighthouse is located on a privately owned recreation area which was developed around an artificial lake, while Lake Minatare Lighthouse was "built to simulate a lighthouse". Also of note is a faux lighthouse called Rock Garden Lighthouse (not listed below), located in Kearney.

Name	Image	Location	Coordinates	Year first lit	Automated	Year deactivated	Current lens	Height
Linoma Lighthouse		Gretna	41°3′44″N 96°19′8″W	1939	Always	Active	Decorative	100 ft (30 m)
Lake Minatare Lighthouse		Scottsbluff	41°55′50″N 103°30′05″W	1939	Always	Active	Decorative	55 ft (17 m)

== Pacific (states) ==
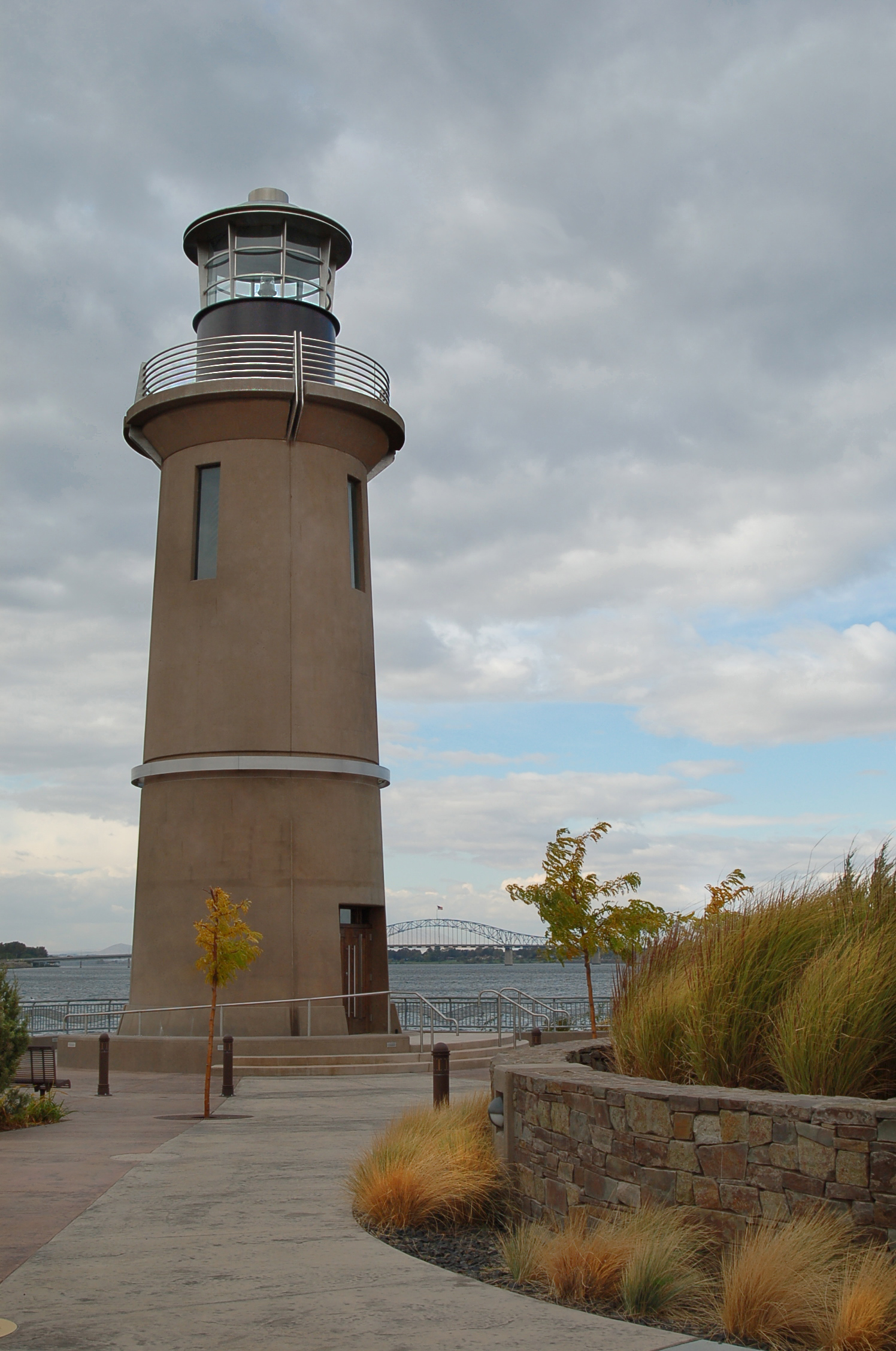
Clover Island Lighthouse (built 2010) in Washington is the first to be built in the United States since 1962.

State	Tallest (H)	Shortest (H)	Oldest (currently standing)
Alaska	Cape Decision Light; 75 ft (23 m)	Point Sherman Light; 20 ft (6.1 m)^{E}	Eldred Rock Light (1906)
Washington	Grays Harbor Light; 107 ft (33 m)	Turn Point Light; 20 ft (6.1 m)	Cape Disappointment (1856)
Oregon	Yaquina Head Light; 93 ft (28 m)	Warrior Rock Light; 25 ft (7.6 m)	Cape Blanco Light (1870)
California	Pigeon Point Light; Point Arena Light; 115 ft (35 m)^{F}	Lime Point Light; 20 ft (6.1 m)	Point Pinos Light (1855)
Hawaii	Moloka'i Light; 138 ft (42 m)	Kuki'i Point Light; 22 ft (6.7 m)	Moloka'i Light (1909)^{G}

== South ==
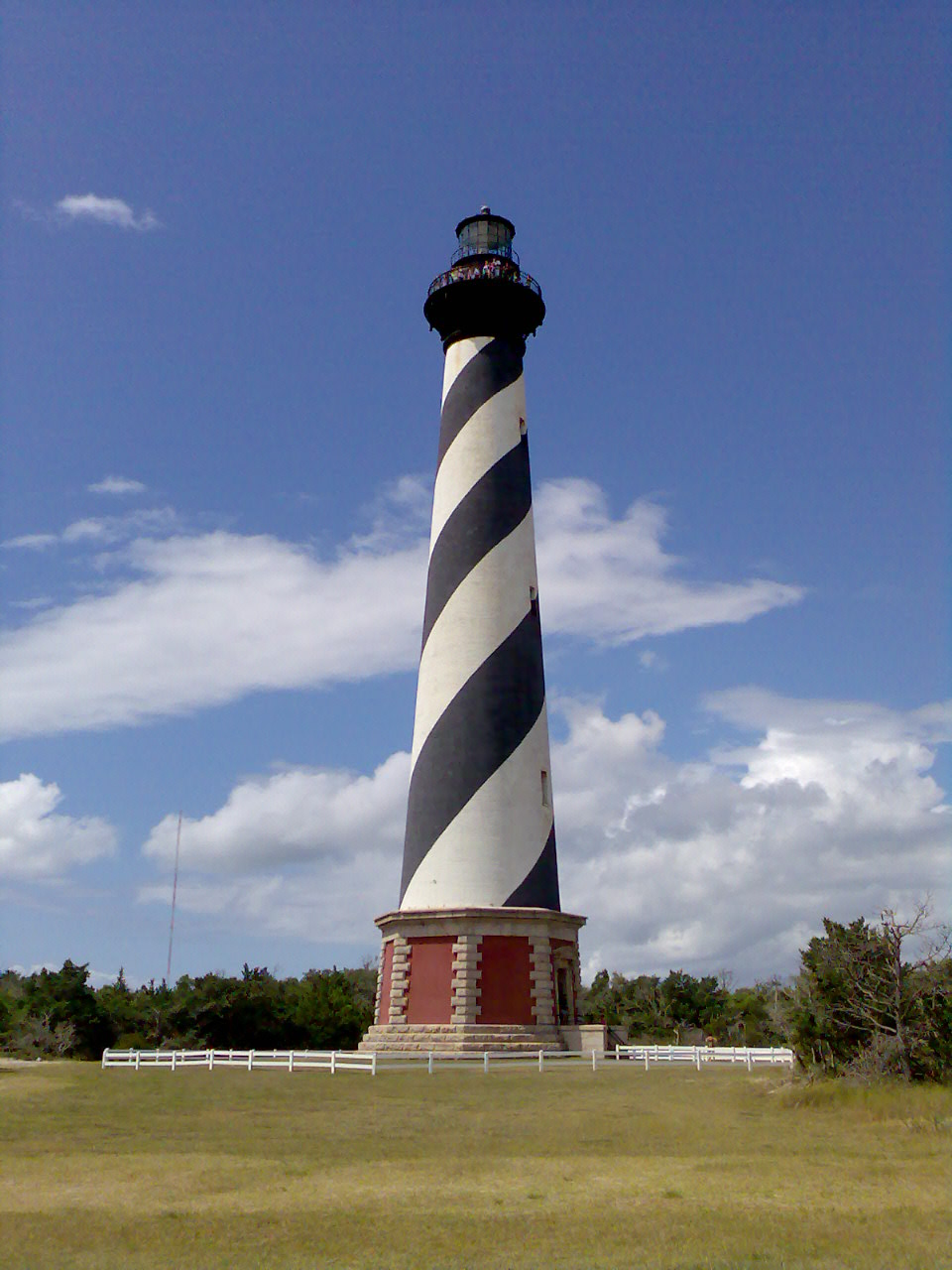
America's tallest lighthouse, Cape Hatteras Light, located on the Outer Banks of North Carolina^{B}

State	Tallest (H)	Shortest (H)	Oldest (currently standing)
Alabama	Sand Island Light; 131 ft (40 m)	Middle Bay Light; 54 ft (16 m)	Sand Island Light (1873)
Florida	Ponce de Leon Light; 175 ft (53 m)	Cedar Key Light; 23 ft (7.0 m)	Amelia Island Light (1838)
Georgia	Tybee Island Light; 145 ft (44 m)	Cockspur Island Light; 46 ft (14 m)	Sapelo Island Light (1820)
Louisiana	Unknown	Unknown	New Canal Light (1839)
Mississippi	Biloxi Light; 61 ft (19 m)	Tie; 30 ft (9.1 m)^{I}	Biloxi Light (1848)
North Carolina	Cape Hatteras Light; 210 ft (64 m)	—N/a	Bald Head Light (1817)
South Carolina	Morris Island Light; 161 ft (49 m)	Haig Point F. R. Light; 18 ft (5.5 m)	Cape Romain Light (Old) (1827)
Texas	Point Bolivar Light; 116 ft (35 m)	—N/a	Point Isabel Light (1852)
Virginia	Cape Charles Light; 191 ft (58 m)	Deepwater Shoals Light (1855)	Cape Henry Lighthouse (1792)

== United States territories ==
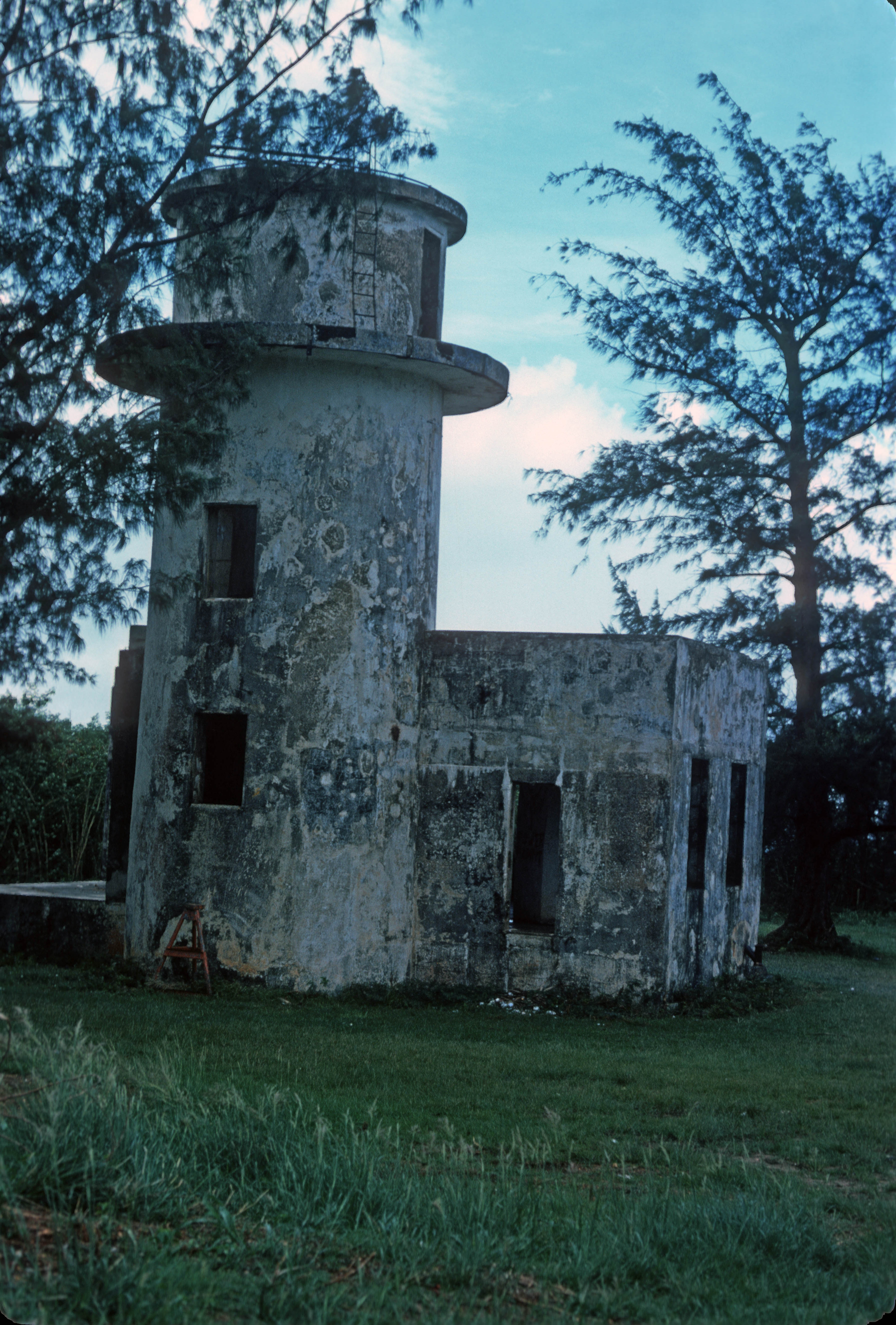
Garapan Light in Saipan, one of only two remaining lighthouses built during Japanese occupation

Territory	Tallest (H)	Shortest (H)	Oldest (currently standing)
Puerto Rico	Punta Higüero Light 69 ft (21 m)	Los Morrillos Light; 40 ft (12 m)	Port San Juan Light (1846)
American Samoa	Breakers Point Light190 ft (58 m)	Aunu'u Light 25 ft (7.6 m)	
Guam	Ritidian Point Light 574 ft (175 m)	Apra Outer Harbor Range Front Light 39 ft (12 m)	Orote Point Light (1929)
Northern Mariana Islands	Japanese Light (a.k.a. Garapan Light) (Unknown)		Japanese Light (a.k.a. Garapan Light) (1934)
Virgin Islands	Hams Bluff Light 394 ft (120 m)	Fort Luise Augusta Light 58 ft (18 m)	Fort Luise Augusta Light (1919)

== United States Minor Outlying Islands ==
This table lists lighthouses that are in insular areas of the United States. All of the islands listed below are uninhabited, and have not been formerly incorporated into the country.

Name	Image	Location	Coordinates	Year first lit	Automated	Year deactivated	Current lens	Height
Baker Island Light		Baker Island	0°11′44.8″N 176°29′03.4″W	1935	Never	1942	None	16 ft (4.9 m)
Howland Island Light (aka: Earhart Light)		Howland Island	0°48′20.6″N 176°37′08.6″W	1937	Never	1942	None	20 ft (6.1 m)
Jarvis Island Light		Jarvis Island	0°22′13.6″S 160°00′24.1″W	1935	Never	1945	None	16 ft (4.9 m)
Navassa Island Light		Navassa Island	18°23′50.7″N 75°00′46.2″W	1917	1929	1996	None	161 ft (49 m)
Sand Island Aviation Light	—N/a	Midway Atoll	28°12′42.7″N 177°22′36.4″W	Unknown	Unknown	Active	Unknown	46 ft (14 m)
Wake Island Aviation Light	—N/a	Wake Island	19°17′02.0″N 166°39′05.2″E	Unknown	Unknown	Active	Unknown	52 ft (16 m)

== See also ==
- List of lighthouses in the United States by height
- List of lightships of the United States
- Lists of lighthouses
- National Historic Preservation Act of 1966
- National Historic Lighthouse Preservation Act
- United States Lighthouse Society
- United States Coast Guard History and Heritage Sites

== Notes ==
A. The shortest lighthouse in Massachusetts is either Palmer Island Light at 24 ft (7.3 m) or Brant Point Light at 26 ft (7.9 m). Sources remain split on this issue, with at least one claiming the latter as the shortest in New England.
B. The Perry Monument in Ohio and the Statue of Liberty in New York City are not classified as lighthouses. They would come in as the two tallest lighthouses in the United States otherwise.
C. Minnesota Point Light was built in 1858, but only half of the now ruined tower remains.
D. The oldest light station is Pottawatomie Light which was established in 1836; however, the current buildings date to 1858.
E. The shortest height is for a skeletal tower which was placed in 1981. For "traditional" lighthouses, Point Retreat Light and Cape Spencer Light are tied at 25 ft (7.6 m) each.
F. These two lighthouses are tied at 115 ft (35 m) each.
G. The oldest lighthouse in Hawaii was called "Lahaina Lighthouse", which was built in 1905 before it was replaced. Moloka'i Light is the oldest currently standing lighthouse; it was first lit a month before the still standing Makapuu Point Light.
H. Pass A L'Outre Light was originally constructed in 1852 elsewhere and moved to its present location.
I. Cat Island Light (first tower), Pass Christian Light, and Ship Island Light were all 30 feet tall.
