= History of Presque Isle =

The History of Presque Isle Pennsylvania began when Presque Isle was created by the wave action of Lake Erie over the course of the 11,000 years that have passed since the last ice age. Presque Isle was likely 3 miles (5 km) west of its current location when it first formed. The constant pressure of wind and water has gradually moved the peninsula to its current location. It continues to slowly move eastward.

== Erielhonan ==
The first known people to inhabit Presque Isle are the Erielhonans, which is where the city of Erie, Pennsylvania, gets its name. An Erielhonan legend taught that the Great Spirit lead them to Presque Isle because of the wealth of game, the abundance of clean fresh water, and the cool breezes "coming from the land of snow and ice" (Canada). They lived in multi-family long houses in villages enclosed in palisades and grew the "Three Sisters"—corn, beans, and squash—during the warm season. In the winter tribal members lived off the stored crops and animals taken in hunts. They also were very resourceful and constructed canoes made out of birch bark found on the peninsula. The Eriez (a shorter name for the Erielhonan) were ultimately destroyed by the Iroquois in 1654, who adopted some of the survivors into their own group, these being primarily absorbed into the Senecas.

Another legend tells us that the Eriez ventured into Lake Erie in search of the land where the sun set. The spirit of the lake blew a fierce storm to keep the Eriez from finding the sun. To protect the Eriez from the storm, their god laid his outstretched arm into the lake, giving them safety during the storm. The god's arm would remain in the lake, protecting the tribe's future generations.

A skeleton was found by Sue Daley in February 1980. It was later determined to have belonged to an Eriez Native American by an anthropologist.

== European Settlers ==
Once settlers from Europe started to come to America, the demand of Presque Isle became even higher because of its ideal location for military uses. In 1749, the French overtook the peninsula from the Iroquois and built a fort naming it Fort Presque Isle meaning, “almost island”. Charles Boishebert and 200 men, who were sent out by the Canadian Governor Marquis Duquesne, to make new settlements for the French, discovered the land. In 1760, the British commandeered the fort, but only had possession of it for a few years. The British began to prevent the French and Native Americans from trading with each other and it angered the Native Americans, so they attacked and pillaged many British settlements including Fort Presque Isle, burning it to the ground.

== War of 1812 ==
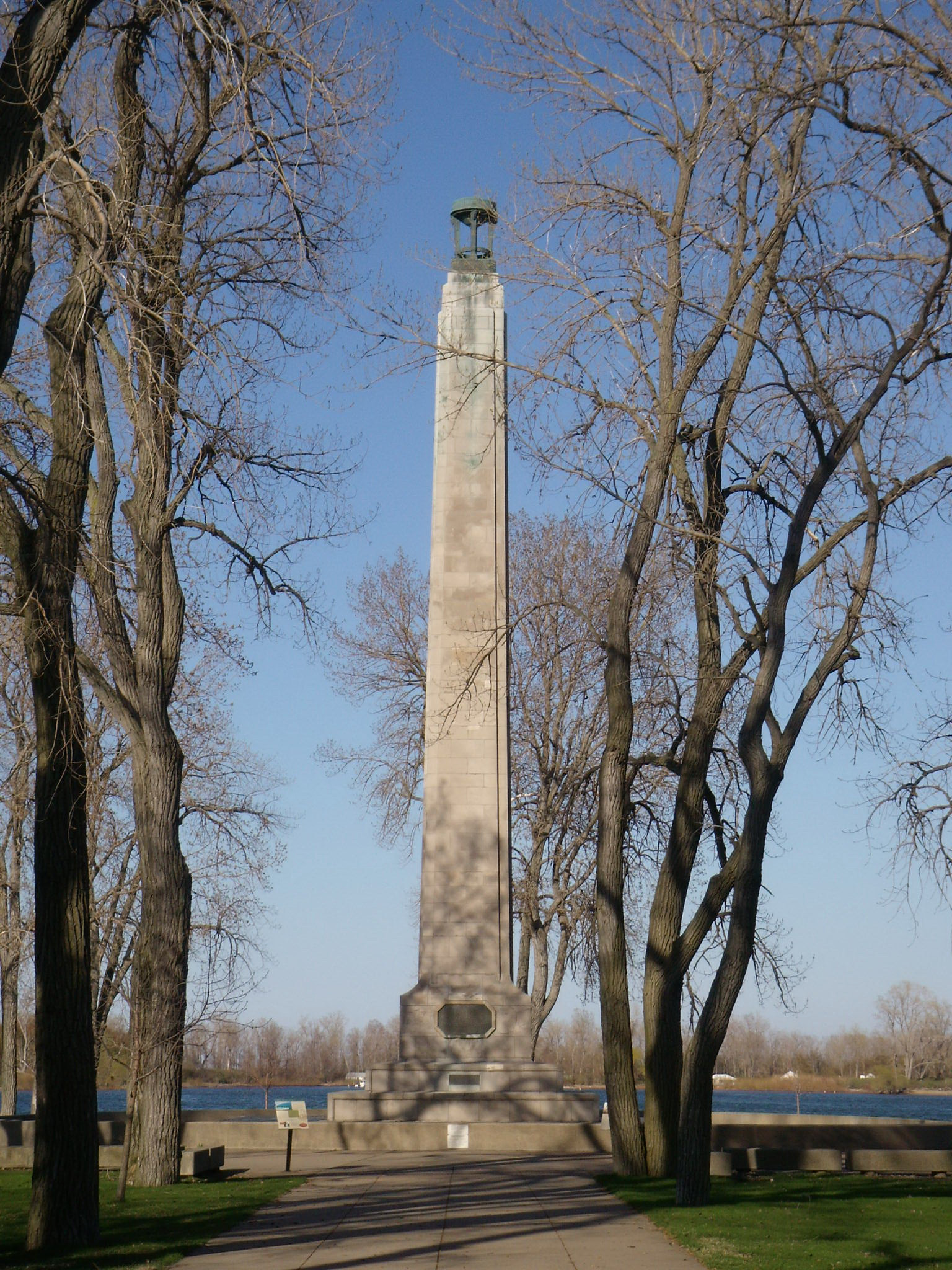
Perry Monument

Presque Isle played a part in the victory over the British in the Battle of Lake Erie, during the War of 1812. Oliver Hazard Perry commanded the fleet in battle. He strategically used the peninsula's Presque Isle Bay as a pier and, a place to construct six out of nine of the ships in his fleet. Using this location protected the men by creating an obstacle for potential attackers because they would have to travel all the way around the peninsula to reach them. The small bay near the tip of the peninsula (next to the current Perry's Monument) was later named Misery Bay, because of the hardships that took place there after the men returned from battle, during the winters of 1812–1814. Many men suffered from smallpox and were kept in quarantine in the area of the bay. A great deal of the infected died and were buried in a pond now called Grave Yard Pond.

In 1926, the Perry monument was built to commemorate Oliver Hazard Perry on his victory over the British in the battle on Lake Erie. The monument is a 101 feet (30.8 m) obelisk located at Crystal point on Presque Isle.

== U.S. Coast Guard Station ==
United States Life-Saving Service District 9 opened a life-saving station (LSS) at Presque Isle in 1876 pursuant to an Act of Congress two years earlier. William Clark was keeper from 1877 until he drowned in 1891. He was succeeded by Andrew Jansen, who was keeper until 1914. When the Life-Saving Service and the Revenue Cutter Service merged in 1915 to become the United States Coast Guard, LSS Presque Isle, also called the Erie life-saving station, became Coast Guard Station #236. The station remains in operation to this day, assigned to the Ninth District (Great Lakes) of the U.S. Coast Guard. See the Ninth District web page

== Lighthouses ==
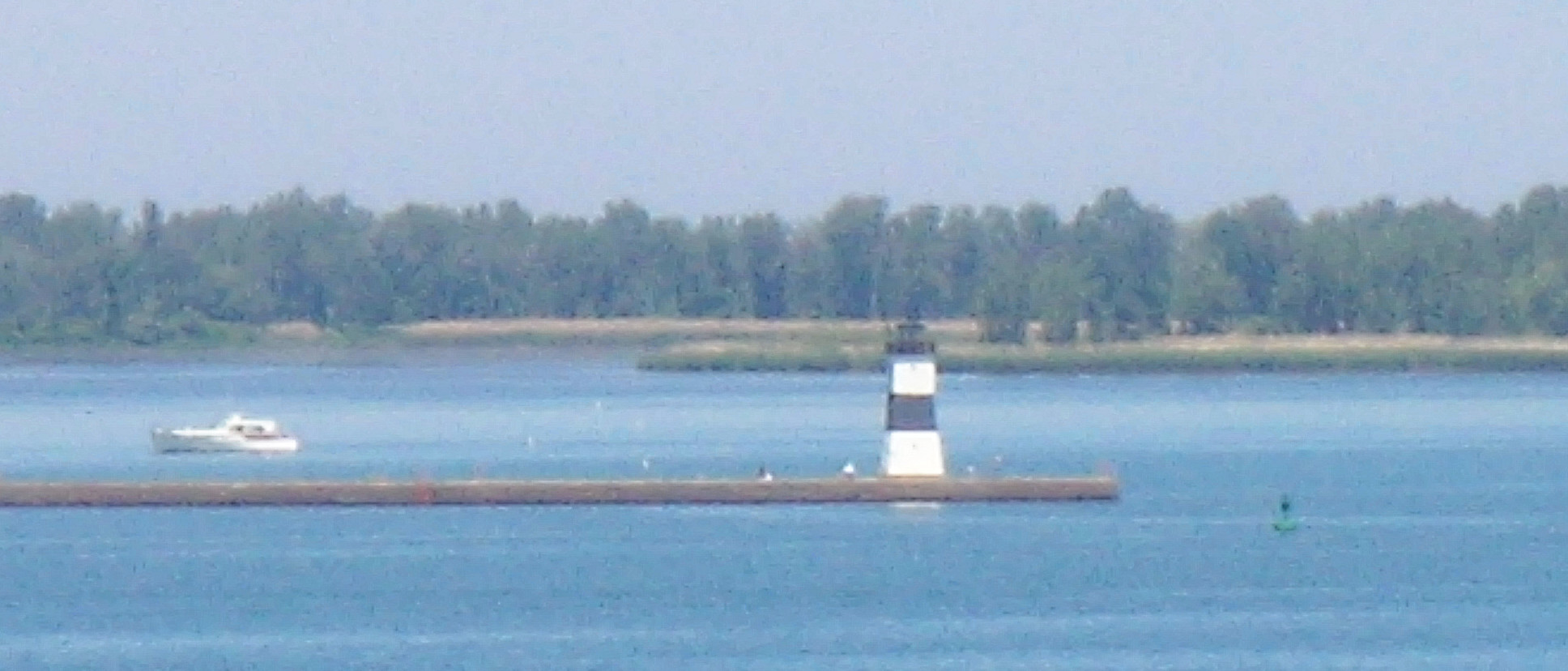
North Pier Light

As Erie, PA started to grow, boat traffic began to increase coming and leaving Erie's harbor, so there became a need for lighthouses for guidance. In 1858, the North Pier light was constructed. This pierhead light is stationed at the end of the Erie Harbor Channel. It began as a wooden tower, erected in 1830. A stronger steel structure was brought from France and constructed at Erie to replace the wooden beacon, which was damaged by a schooner. In 1872, the Presque Isle Lighthouse was built and was lit on 12 July 1873. It was the second lighthouse constructed on Lake Erie. Presque Isle Lighthouse is 74 feet (23 m) tall with a red brick house that is used as a park residence. Two lighthouses can be found in the park. On the far east side of the park, near the inlet between the lake and the bay, is the Erie Harbor North Pier Light.

== Present day ==
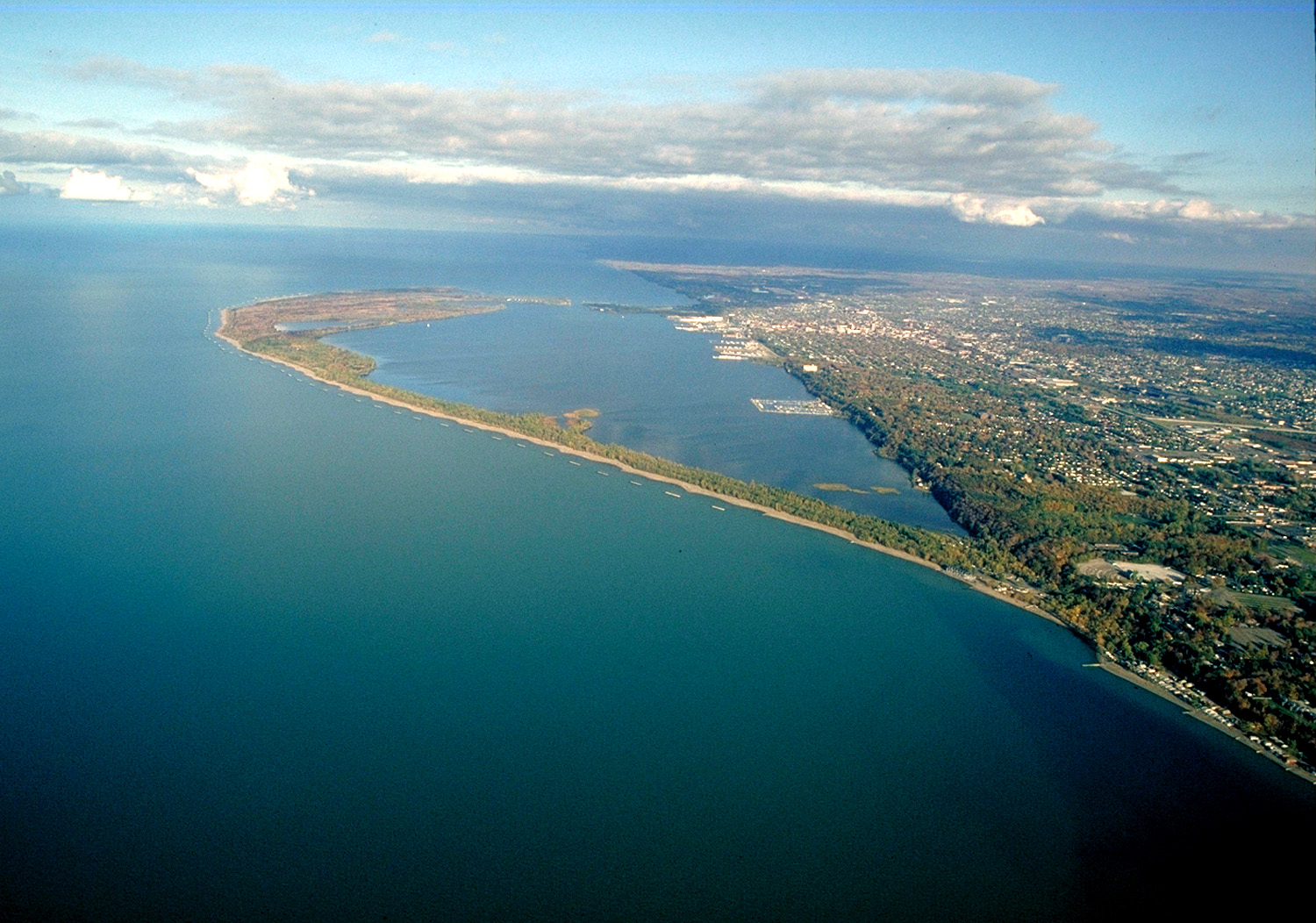
Presque Isle from an airplane.

Today Presque Isle is used as a Pennsylvania state park, Presque Isle State Park, that is open to the public for a wide variety of recreation. The peninsula became a state park in 1921, and since then large amounts of money have been spent to make visiting the park a better and more pleasant experience. Three years after becoming a park the project of lying paved roads around the park began. Today the road network creates a 13-mile loop around the outer edge of peninsula. Before the roads were built the only visitor to the park were primarily boaters. Many years later the roads were destroyed by storms, and they were rebuilt further away from the shore. The peninsula has a great environment for exercising. In 1984, a multi-purpose blacktop trail was built for bike riding, running, and inline skating. In 1992, 55 break walls were constructed off the shore to slow down the waves thus slowing down the amount erosion that would take place on beaches. These break walls save the park over a million dollars a year that would be spent on replenishing sand on the beaches. The project took 4 years and cost over $23 million. In the summer of 2005, the Tom Ridge Environmental Center opened to the public to learn about the unique the environment and wildlife that Presque Isle has. The center cost $31 million to be built.

The city of Erie, PA would most likely not exist if it were not for Presque Isle. Also, Presque Isle brings in roughly about four million visitors a year, which is a major part of the tourism for Erie's economy. “A number of historical elements are briefly mentioned in various archives but detailed records are incomplete or do not survive.” said Don Guerrein. There are a great deal of facts about this peninsula, but there are still many mysteries about the place.

== See also ==
- Presque Isle State Park
- History of Erie, Pennsylvania
