= List of lighthouses in Pennsylvania =

There are several lighthouses in the U.S. state of Pennsylvania.

"Historic Light Station Information and Photography: Pennsylvania". United States Coast Guard Historian's Office. Archived from the original on May 1, 2017.

Name	Image	Location	Coordinates	Year first lit	Automated	Year deactivated	Current Lens	Focal Height
Erie Harbor North Pier Light		Presque Isle	42°09′24.12″N 80°04′14.16″W	1857	Unknown	Active	Unknown	42 ft (13 m)
Erie Land Light		Erie	42°8′38.1″N 80°3′44.1″W	1818 (Former); 1867 (Current)	Never	1899 (Inactive: 1880–1885)	Decorative ("Relit" in 1990)	128 ft (39 m)
Presque Isle Light		Presque Isle	42°9′56.8″N 80°6′55.5″W	1873	1962	Active	VRB-25	73 ft (22 m)
Snug Harbor Light		Conneaut Lake	N/A	1924	Unknown	Active	Unknown	33 ft (10 m)
Turtle Rock Light		Philadelphia	39°58′12″N 75°11′23″W	1887	Unknown	Active	Unknown	Unknown
