= Erie Land Light =

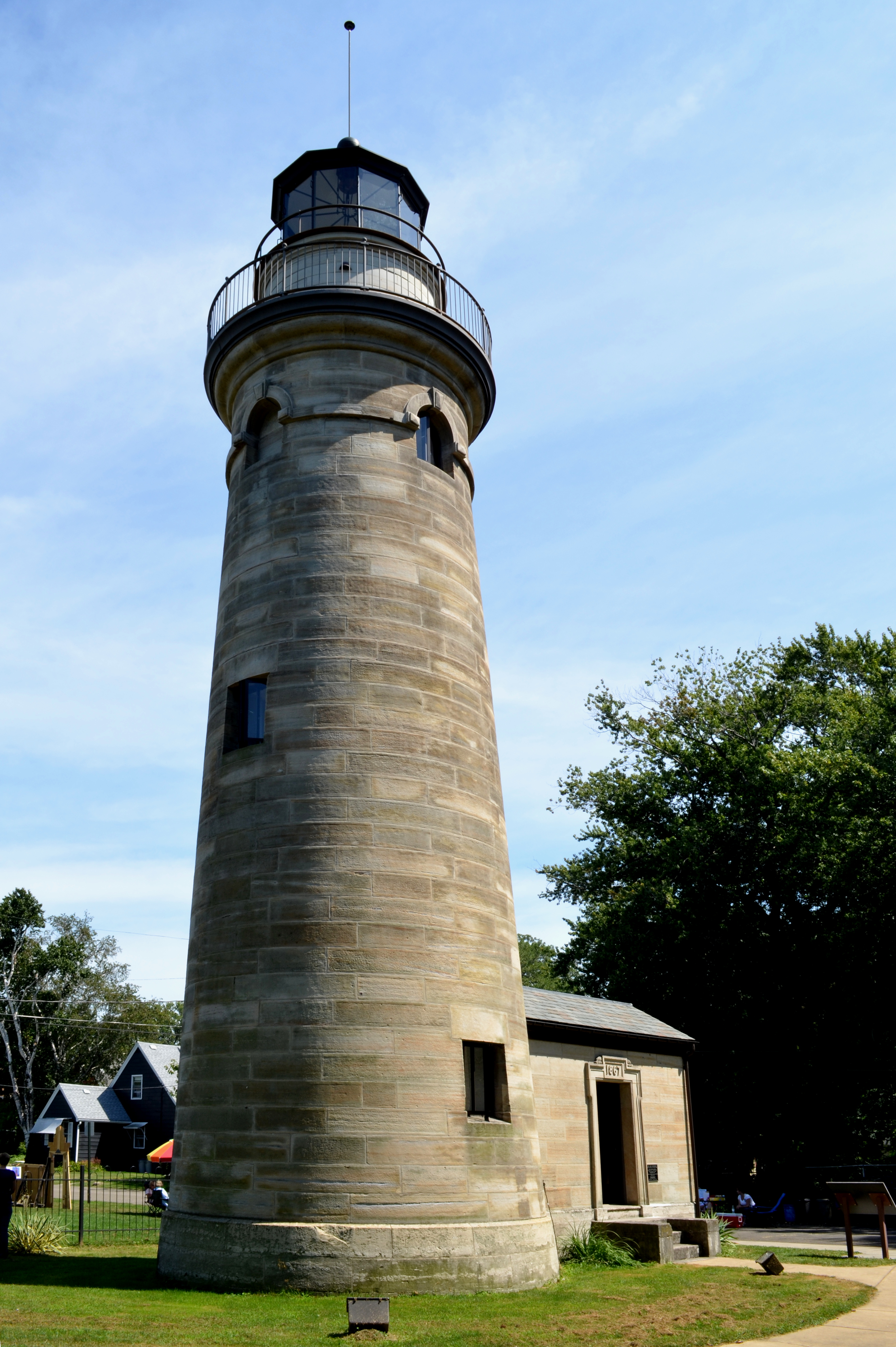
- Location: Lighthouse Park; Erie, Pennsylvania; United States
- Coordinates: 42°8′38.1″N 80°3′44.1″W

Tower
- Constructed: 1818
- Construction: Sandstone
- Height: 48 ft 10 in (15 m)
- Shape: Conical
- Heritage: National Register of Historic Places listed place

Light
- First lit: 1867 (current tower)
- Deactivated: 1880–1885, 1899
- Focal height: 128 ft (39 m)
- Lens: Third-order Fresnel
- Light source: Mineral oil
- Range: 17 nmi (20 mi; 31 km)
- Characteristic: F W

U.S. National Register of Historic Places
- Official name: Erie Land Lighthouse
- Designated: March 30, 1978
- Reference no.: 78002397

The Erie Land Light, also known as the Old Presque Isle Light, is a lighthouse on the shore of Lake Erie in Erie, Pennsylvania. It is one of the three lighthouses in Erie, along with the Presque Isle Light and the North Pier Light. The lighthouse is situated on the bluffs overlooking the lake in Lighthouse Park east of downtown Erie.

The lighthouse was originally constructed in 1818 becoming one of the first to be built by the United States on the Great Lakes. The tower was replaced in 1851 for the first time; in 1858, due to its poor foundations and soil quality, it sank into the ground. The current structure was built in 1867 and remained in service until 1880. It was reactivated five years later before being permanently decommissioned in 1899. Both the lenses and lantern were eventually removed. The Erie Land Light was sold to the city of Erie in 1934 and was documented by the Historic American Buildings Survey (HABS) in 1936. It was listed on the National Register of Historic Places in 1978.

== Design ==
The Erie Land Light consists of a sandstone tower and a small, one-story building attached to the tower's southern side; the entire structure was constructed from Berea sandstone lined with brick. The lighthouse tower is 48 feet 10 inches (15 m) with a diameter of 19 feet (6 m) tapering to 14 feet (4 m). The interior diameter of the tower is 8 feet (2 m) and contains a cast iron, spiral staircase with 69 steps. The balcony where the lantern room sits is 16 feet (5 m) wide. The structure attached to the tower is 8 feet 3 inches (3 m) wide, 16 feet 3 inches (5 m) long, and 16 feet 5 inches (5 m) tall; it is separated from the tower by 7-foot -tall (2 m) steel doors.

The beacon itself, when it was in operation, was fueled by mineral oil and exhibited a fixed, white light. It had a focal plane 128 feet (39 m) above mean lake level and a range of 17 nautical miles (20 mi; 31 km). When the current lighthouse was built a third-order Fresnel lens was installed; the lens were transferred to another lighthouse when it was deactivated. Currently, the tower is equipped with a modern marine navigational beacon.

== History ==
In 1810, Congress authorized the construction and appropriated $1,600 for the first two lighthouses on the Great Lakes; one to be located at "the junction of Buffalo Creek and Lake Erie" and the other "on or near Presq' isle [sic]". A total of 2 to 4 acres (1 to 2 ha) of land overlooking the entrance to the channel into Presque Isle Bay was ceded by Brigadier General John Kelso of the Pennsylvania militia on April 2, 1811 for the lighthouse. Both the construction of the Buffalo Main Light and the Erie Land Light were delayed until 1818.

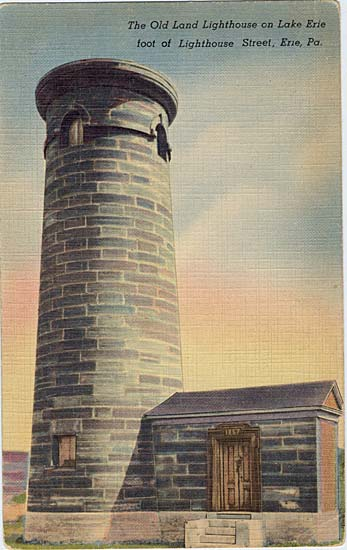
On a pre-1914 postcard

By 1858, the original, square, 20-foot (6 m) tower had begun to sink into the ground. The second tower was a 56-foot-tall (17 m), cylindrical tower built from "Milwaukee brick". The foundation of this tower was also unable to cope and had to be replaced again by 1866. An investigation found that a layer of quicksand was below the foundation of the Erie Land Light. To ensure the third tower remain sturdy, unlike its predecessors, the foundation was dug 20 feet (6 m) deep. Eight courses of oak timbers 12 by 12 inches (30 cm × 30 cm) and 20 feet (6 m) long formed the base of the foundation. Atop the timber was poured 6 feet (1.8 m) of Portland cement mixed with crushed limestone; stone 8 feet (2.4 m) thick was laid on the concrete. The third tower was built from sandstone. The Fresnel lens that was installed in the new tower cost $7,000 and shipped from Paris, France. A two-story, saltbox lightkeeper's house was also built at the same time.

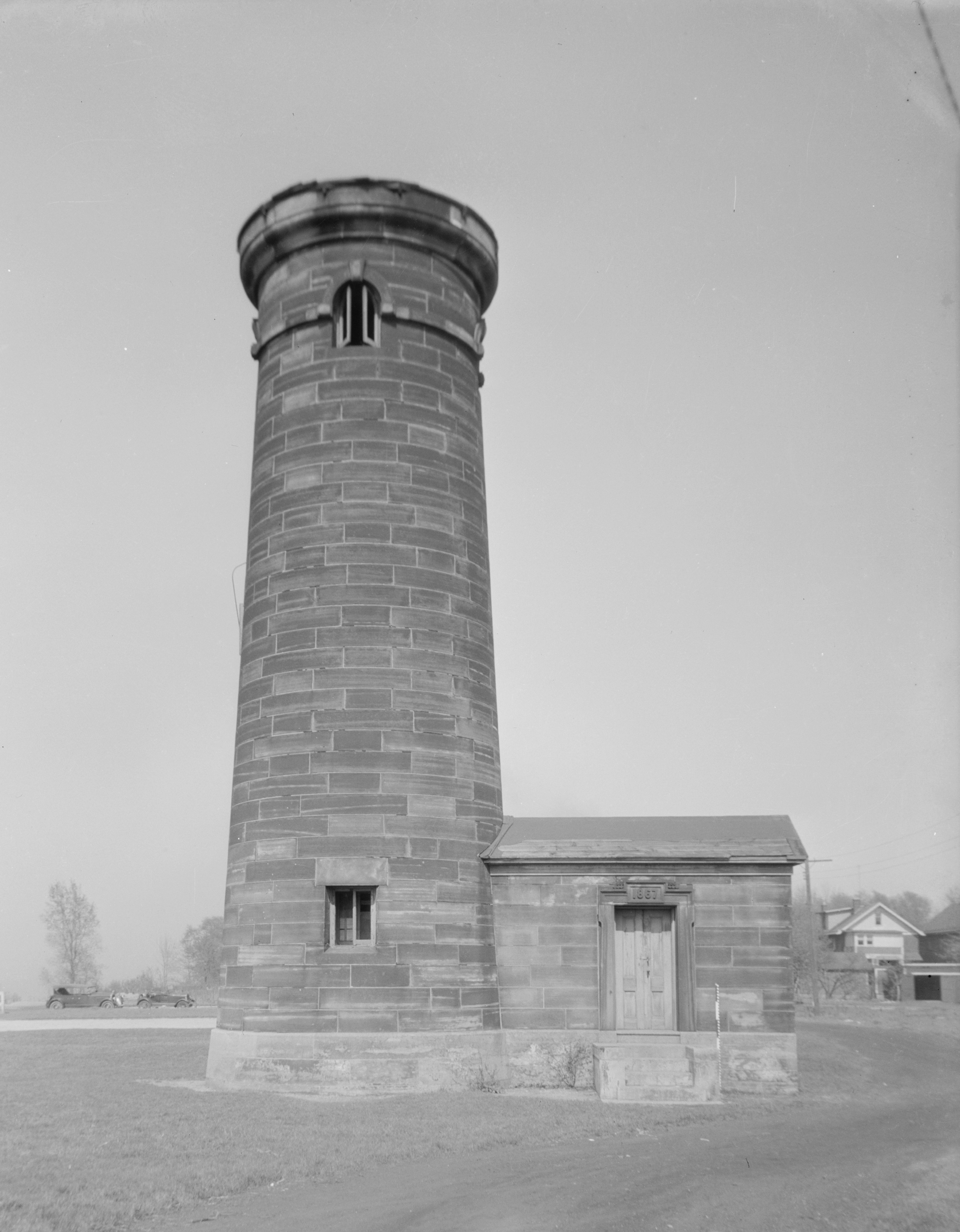
HABS photo of the lighthouse in 1936 without its lantern.

On the recommendation of the naval inspector for the lighthouse district, the Erie Land Light was deactivated in 1880; it was sold for $1,800. After much public outcry, the lighthouse was repurchased in 1884 for double the amount and was reactivated the next year by an act of Congress. In 1886, the lighthouse was again decommissioned, though caretakers were still appointed and the beacon continued to operate until December 26, 1899 when it was finally extinguished. The lenses were removed in 1902 and were sent to the Marblehead Light in Ohio. After the lantern room was removed, the top of the tower was covered in tar paper. The lighthouse was acquired by the city of Erie in 1934.

=== Modern use and restoration ===
The Erie Land Light was listed on the National Register of Historic Places on March 30, 1978. A wooden replica of the lantern room was placed on the tower in 1990 and was relit on December 26, 1999. The replica lantern room was eventually blown off of the tower on May 5, 2003 during a windstorm.

In 2004, the Pennsylvania Department of Transportation and the Pennsylvania Historical and Museum Commission provided $400,000 in grants for restoration work on the lighthouse. The lighthouse's interior stairs and over 200 bricks were replaced, and a 6,300-pound (2,860 kg) copper replica of the original lantern room was built. The lantern was hoisted on to the lighthouse on March 19, 2004. The restoration was completed on June 19, 2004. The Erie–Western Pennsylvania Port Authority proposed in 2005 to take ownership of the Land Light from the city to increase its tourism potential, and, in 2010, to assume responsibility for the maintenance of the grounds surrounding the lighthouse. The lighthouse is opened to the public annually in the summer as a fundraiser for the Erie Playhouse.

== See also ==
- Lighthouses in the United States
- National Register of Historic Places listings in Erie County, Pennsylvania

== Sources ==
- Bates, Samuel P.; Brown, R. C.; Russell, N. W; Weakley, F. E; Whitman, Benjamin (1884). History of Erie County, Pennsylvania. Chicago: Warner and Beers. OCLC 8622308.
- Morrison, Karl E. (October 5, 1936). "Land Lighthouse" (PDF). Historic American Buildings Survey. Washington, D.C.: Library of Congress.
- Nelson, S. B (1896). Nelson's Biographical Dictionary and Historical Reference Book of Erie County, Pennsylvania. Erie, Pennsylvania: Self-published.
- Putnam, George Rockwell (1917). Lighthouses and Lightships of the United States. Boston: Houghton Mifflin.
- Zacher, Susan M. (September 13, 1977). National Register of Historic Places Registration: Pennsylvania SP Erie Land Lighthouse. National Archives and Records Administration. (Downloading may be slow.)
