= List of lighthouses in Illinois and Indiana =

The following is a list of lighthouses in the U.S. states of Illinois and Indiana. These two states are listed together as both have very few lighthouses that are confined to the Great Lakes.

== Illinois ==
"Historic Light Station Information and Photography: Illinois". United States Coast Guard Historian's Office. Archived from the original on May 19, 2017.

Name	Image	Location	Coordinates	Year first lit	Automated	Year deactivated	Current Lens	Focal Height
Chicago Harbor Light		Chicago	41°53′22″N 87°35′26″W	1832 (Former); 1893 (Current)	1979	Active	Unknown	82 ft (25 m)
Grosse Point Light		Evanston	42°3′50″N 87°40′34″W	1874	1934	Active (Inactive: 1941–1946)	Second-order Fresnel	119 ft (36 m)
Waukegan Harbor Light		Waukegan	42°21′38.5″N 87°48′48.3″W	1849 (Former); 1899 (Current)	1939	Active	Unknown	36 ft (11 m)

== Indiana ==
"Historic Light Station Information and Photography: Indiana". United States Coast Guard Historian's Office. Archived from the original on May 1, 2017.

Name	Image	Location	Coordinates	Year first lit	Automated	Year deactivated	Current Lens	Focal Height
Buffington Breakwater Light		Gary	N/A					
Calumet Harbor Light		Chicago	N/A	1851 (Former); 1995 (Current)	Unknown	Active (skeleton tower)	Unknown	Unknown
Gary Harbor Breakwater Light		Gary	N/A	1911	Unknown	Active	Modern beacon	Unknown
Indiana Harbor East Breakwater Light		Hammond	41°40′51″N 87°26′28″W	1920 (Former); 1935 (Current)	Unknown	Active	Unknown	78 ft (24 m)
Michigan City Breakwater Light		Michigan City	N/A	1904	Never	1909 (Destroyed)	None	Unknown
Michigan City East Light (East Pierhead Light)		Michigan City	41°43′22″N 86°54′21″W	1904	1960	Active	2130C	50 ft (15 m)
Michigan City West Pierhead Light		Michigan City	N/A	1875	Never	1906 (Destroyed)	None	Unknown
Old Michigan City Light		Michigan City	41°43′22″N 86°54′21″W	1837 (Former); 1858 (Current)	Never	1904 (Now a museum)	None	60 ft (18 m)

Notable faux lighthouses:

- Cooper Memorial (1997), on the Prairie Creek Reservoir near Muncie, is an active light but does not meet the Directory's size standard for a lighthouse.
- Gloryland Lighthouse, near New Castle, is not on navigable water.
