= Tawas Point Light =

Lighthouse in Michigan, United States

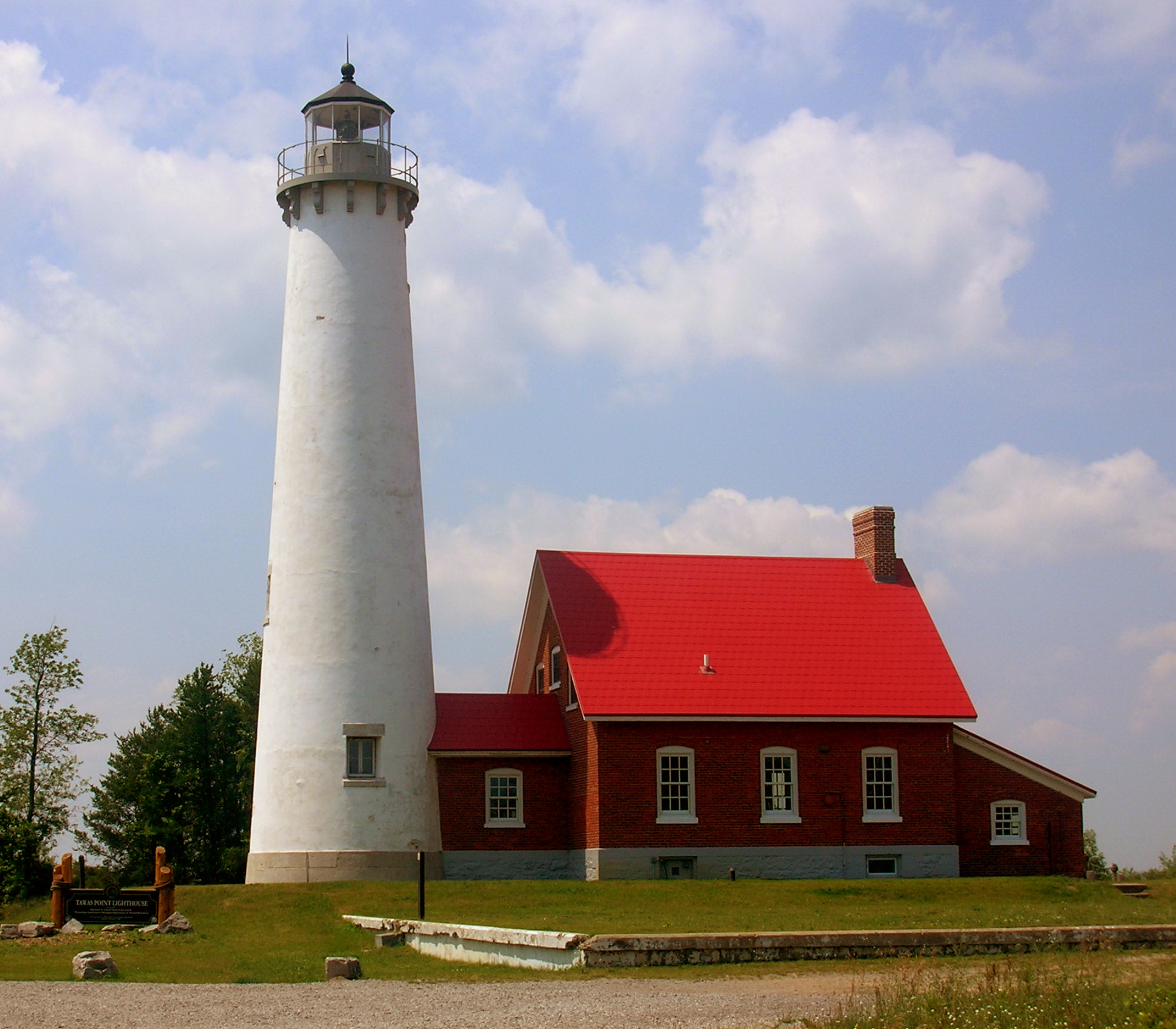
- Location: Baldwin Township, Iosco County Michigan
- Coordinates: 44.254°N 83.449°W

Tower
- Constructed: 1853
- Construction: Brick and masonry
- Height: 67 feet (20 m)
- Shape: Conical
- Markings: white w/black lantern attached brick cottage w/red roof
- Heritage: National Register of Historic Places listed place, Michigan State Historic Site
- Fog signal: HORN: 2 blasts ev 60s (3s bl- 3s si-3s bl-51s si). 3,150 feet, 232° from light. Operates May 1 to Oct. 20.

Light
- First lit: 1853
- Focal height: 70 feet (21 m)
- Lens: Fifth order Fresnel lens (original), Fourth order Fresnel lens (current)
- Range: white 16 nautical miles (30 km; 18 mi); red 12 nautical miles (22 km; 14 mi)
- Characteristic: Oc W 4s (R sector) Red from 045° to 135°
- Tawas Point Light
- U.S. National Register of Historic Places
- Michigan State Historic Site
- Built: 1876
- NRHP reference No.: 84001453

Significant dates
- Added to NRHP: July 19, 1984
- Designated MSHS: April 23, 1971

Tawas Point Light is located in the Tawas Point State Park off Tawas Bay in Lake Huron in Baldwin Township in Northern Michigan.

== History ==
In 1850, Congress appropriated $5,000 for the construction of a lighthouse. In 1852, construction started, and the lighthouse was commissioned in 1853. After the lighthouse was built, many problems were encountered. Shifting sands caused the point to be extended by nearly a mile. The original light was a 5th Order Fresnel lens, later upgraded when the building was replaced.

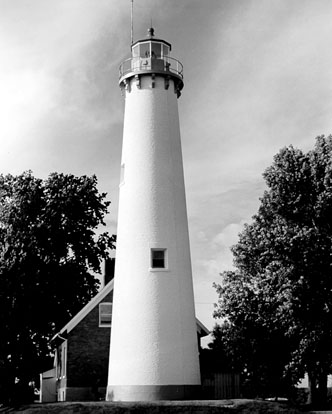
Undated USCG image

In 1867, the Inspector of the lighthouse said that the lighthouse was wearing down to the point where they should consider renovating it. The Lighthouse Board ignored his request to put more money in the lighthouse because they had bigger problems at hand in Ottawa Point. The waves caused sand build-up by the Point, which added almost a mile, more of land. The lighthouse was so far inland that mariners were unable to see the lighthouse's light. To add to the problem this lighthouse was known for its dim light. With all these problems combined, it caused a shipwreck from Captain Olmstead's schooner "Dolphin". He blamed the lighthouse stating that it was too dim to see the light. This caused the Lighthouse board to reconsider their option at renovating or rebuilding a new one. In 1875 Congress approved a $30,000 amount for a brand new lighthouse. They finished building the lighthouse sometime in 1877.

It was originally known as Ottawa Point. The name was officially changed to Tawas Point in 1902. The point is a substantial hazard to navigation. Additionally, because it is tucked behind the point, Tawas Bay is an ideal shelter from storms, wind and waves out of the north and northeast. The point juts out into Lake Huron, and has been getting much larger over time. A map is available, which shows the accretion. The original light was begun in 1852, and completed in 1853. The light was fueled at various times by lard oil, then kerosene, and the current light is of course now electric. This is the second lighthouse on the point.

The tower is 70 feet (21 m) tall including the base, with a diameter at base of 16 feet (4.9 m) and a diameter at parapet of 9 feet 6 inches (2.90 m) It is constructed of a brick outer wall, and an inner wall: 24 inches/8 inches thick, respectively. There is an air space between walls of 24 inches (610 mm). The tower has in place a Fourth Order Fresnel lens (/freɪˈnɛl/). The light can be seen for 16 miles (26 km), and has a lens focal plane 70 feet (21 m) above Lake Huron's average water level. The Keeper’s House is 43 feet (13 m) long and 26 feet (7.9 m) wide.

In the 2000s, the house was remodeled by the Michigan Department of Natural Resources, with the assistance and contributions of the Friends of Tawas Point State Park. The downstairs was transformed into a museum for the lighthouse and the upstairs a living quarters for volunteers to rent for one and two week stays. Volunteer keepers will stay for up to two weeks.

Because of its popularity, picturesque form and location, it is often the subject of photographs, and even of needlepoint illustrations.

The Tawas lifesaving station has recently been saved and renovation continues.

The Fresnel lens is still operative, being one of Only 70 such lenses that remain operational in the United States, sixteen of which are use on the Great Lakes of which eight are in Michigan.

In October 2015, the Coast Guard announced that it would remove the Fresnel lens and replace it with a modern optic beacon. But after public comments, the lens remains in place.

== Current events ==
A scaled-down replica called the "Tri-Centennial Light of Detroit" is modeled after the Tawas Point Light, was built at William G. Milliken State Park. The lighthouse is 63 feet tall, and marks the harbor entrance. "The new safety light tower is believed to be the first conical brick structure of this type built in Michigan since 1892 and serves as a tribute to Michigan's Great Lakes maritime history."

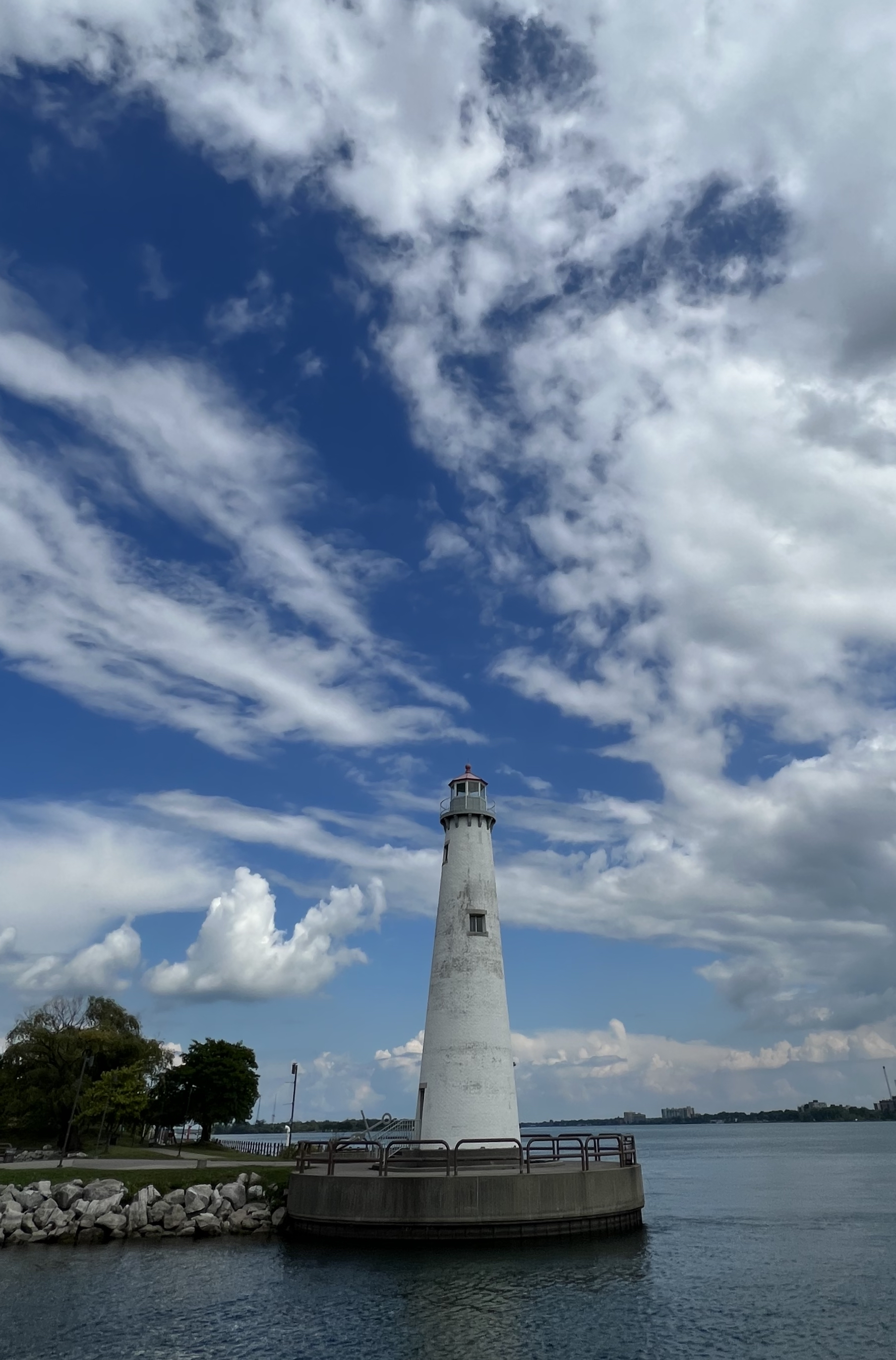
Replica of Tawas Point Lighthouse in William G. Milliken State Park in Detroit

== See also ==
- Lighthouses in the United States
