= Grosse Point Light =

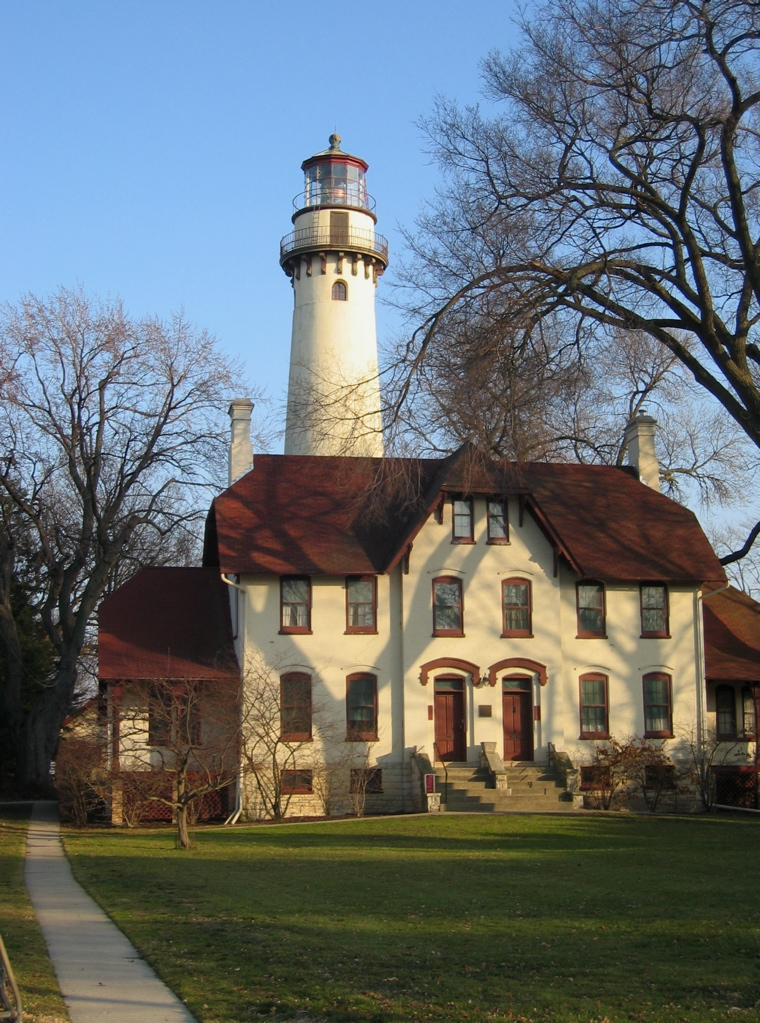
- Location: 2601 Sheridan Rd., Evanston, Illinois
- Coordinates: 42°3′50″N 87°40′34″W

Tower
- Constructed: 1873
- Foundation: Stone/Concrete
- Construction: Cream City Brick encased in concrete Italianate bracketing
- Automated: 1935
- Height: 113 ft (34 m)
- Shape: Frustum of a Cone tower attached to storage building
- Markings: yellow w/red trim & red roof
- Heritage: National Historic Landmark, National Register of Historic Places listed place

Light
- First lit: 1874
- Deactivated: 1941 but reactivated 1946 as Private Aid to Navigation
- Focal height: 119 feet (36 m)
- Lens: Second order Fresnel lens
- Intensity: 68,000 candlepower
- Range: Original: 18 nautical miles; 34 kilometres (21 mi)
- Characteristic: 2 white flashes every 15 seconds
- Grosse Point Light Station
- U.S. National Register of Historic Places
- U.S. National Historic Landmark
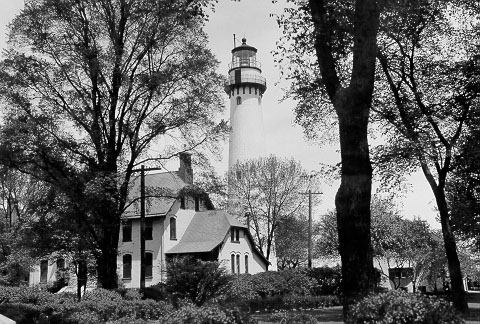
- Undated USCG photo
- Area: 3.5 acres (1.4 ha)
- NRHP reference No.: 76000707

Significant dates
- Added to NRHP: September 08, 1976
- Designated NHL: January 20, 1999

The historic Grosse Point Light is located in Evanston, Illinois. Following several shipping disasters near Evanston, residents successfully lobbied the federal government for a lighthouse. Construction was completed in 1873. The lighthouse was added to the National Register of Historic Places on September 8, 1976. On 20 January 1999, the lighthouse was designated a National Historic Landmark. It is maintained under the jurisdiction of the Evanston Lighthouse Park District, an independent taxing authority.

== History ==
=== Impetus ===
The United States government agreed to construct the lighthouse at Grosse Point after several maritime disasters near the area showed need for it. Shoals were a real hazard, and ship traffic was increasing concurrent with development in the Midwest, the growth of Chicago, the aftermath of the Chicago Fire, and the increased trade and exploitation of natural resources throughout the Great Lakes. Particularly influential was the 1860 sinking of the Lady Elgin, a disaster which claimed more than 300 lives. The citizens of Evanston petitioned the government for the light station, but the Civil War (1861-1865) delayed any funding for the project. Lighthouses in Chicago proper were proving themselves insufficient, so there was a perceived need for action.

=== Construction ===
The project to construct a lighthouse began in 1872, supervised by Orlando Metcalf Poe, who designed the buildings. Most of the construction was completed by June 30, 1873, although the lamp would not be lit for several months. Finally, in March 1874, the light commenced operation. The building is designed in Italianate architecture.

In summer 1865 Colonel Poe became the Lighthouse Board's chief engineer; in 1870 he was promoted to the position of Chief Engineer of the Upper Great Lakes 11th Lighthouse District. In this capacity he designed eight "Poe style lighthouses" and oversaw construction of several. Poe was named District Engineer for the Eleventh Lighthouse District, Those lights are New Presque Isle Light (1870) on Lake Huron, Lake Michigan's South Manitou Island Light (1872), Grosse Point Light (1873) in Evanston, Illinois, Lake Superior's Au Sable Light (1874), Outer Island Light (1874) in the Apostle Islands, Little Sable Point Light (1874) on Lake Michigan, Cheboygan County, Michigan's Spectacle Reef Light {1874} on Lake Huron, Racine, Wisconsin's Wind Point Light (1880); and Manistique, Michigan's Seul Choix Light (1895).

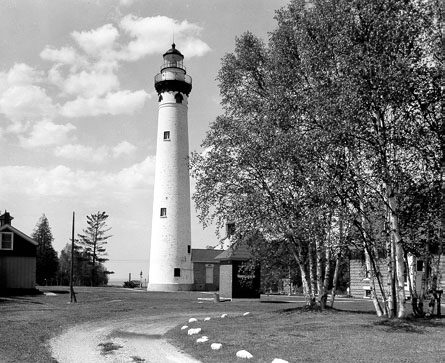
New Presque Isle Light

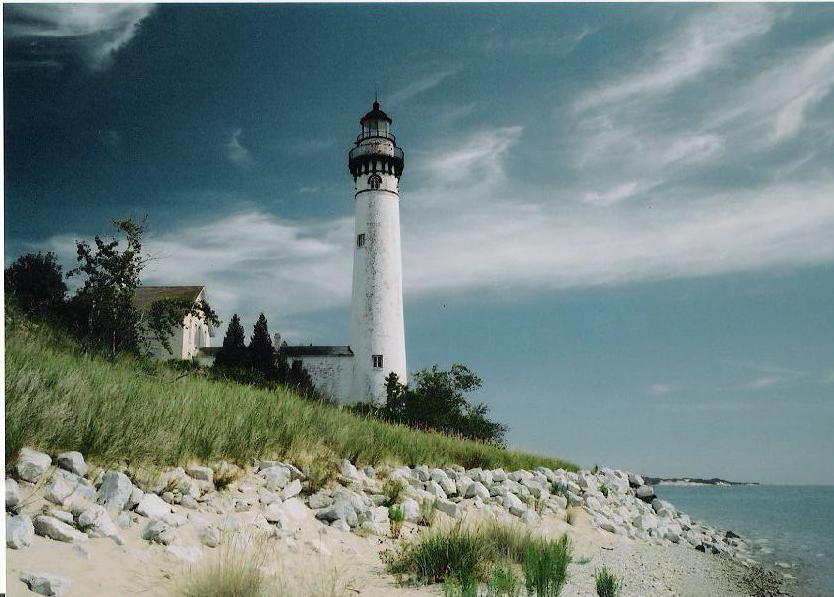
South Manitou Island Light

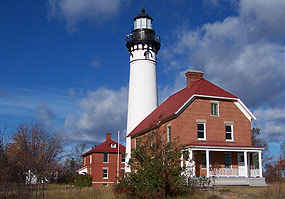
Au Sable Light

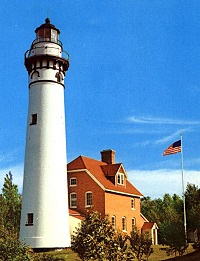
Outer Island Light

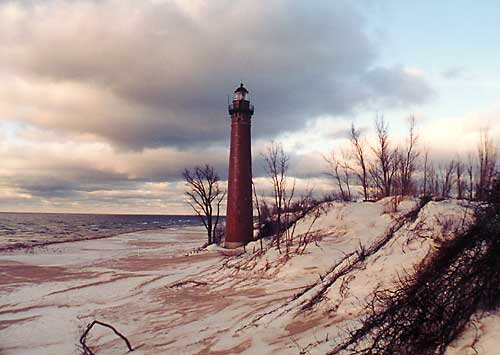
Little Sable Point Light

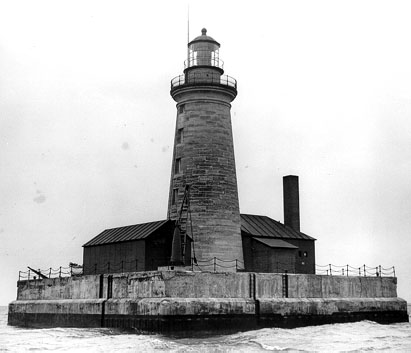
Spectacle Reef Light

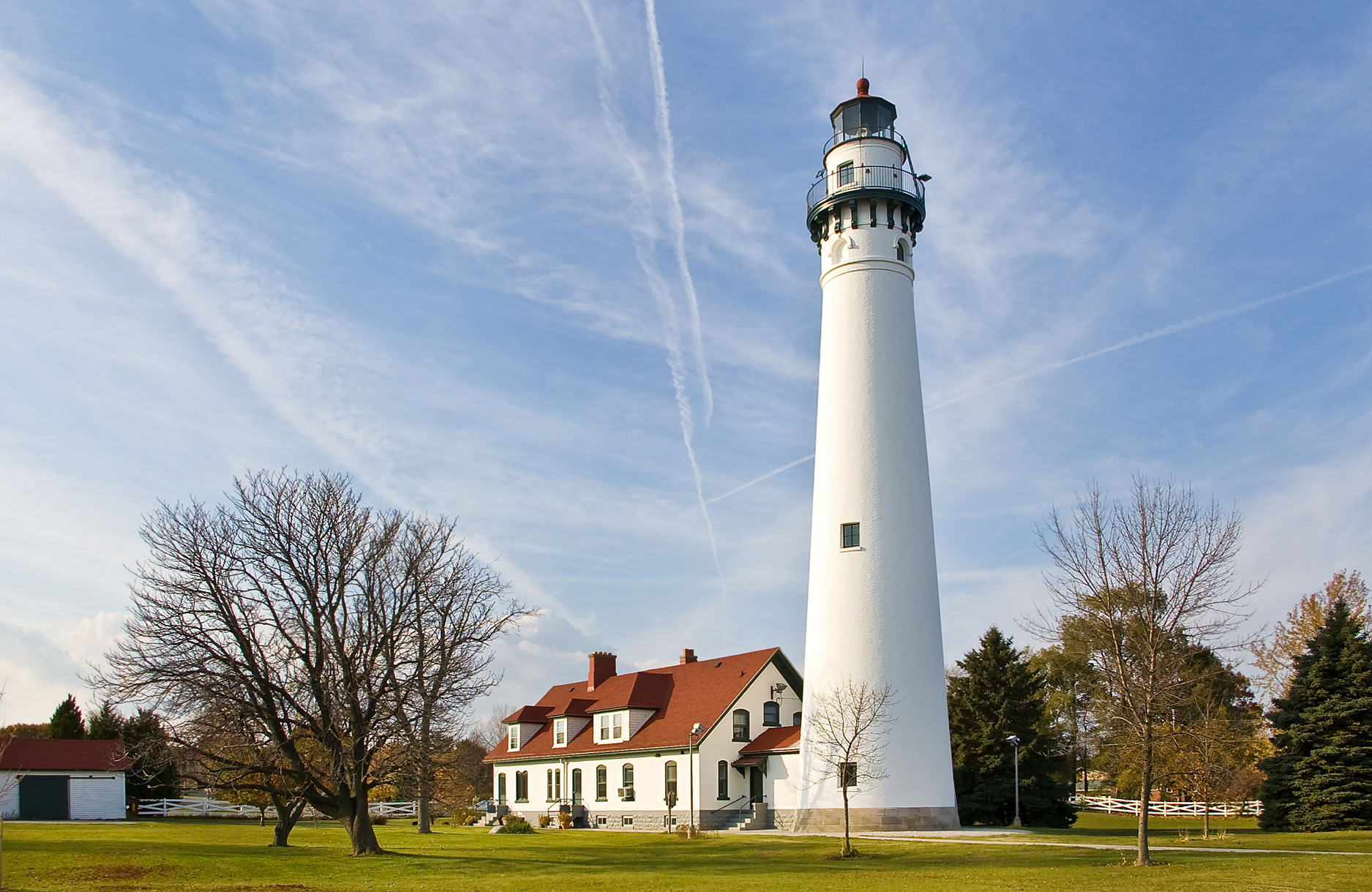
Wind Point Light

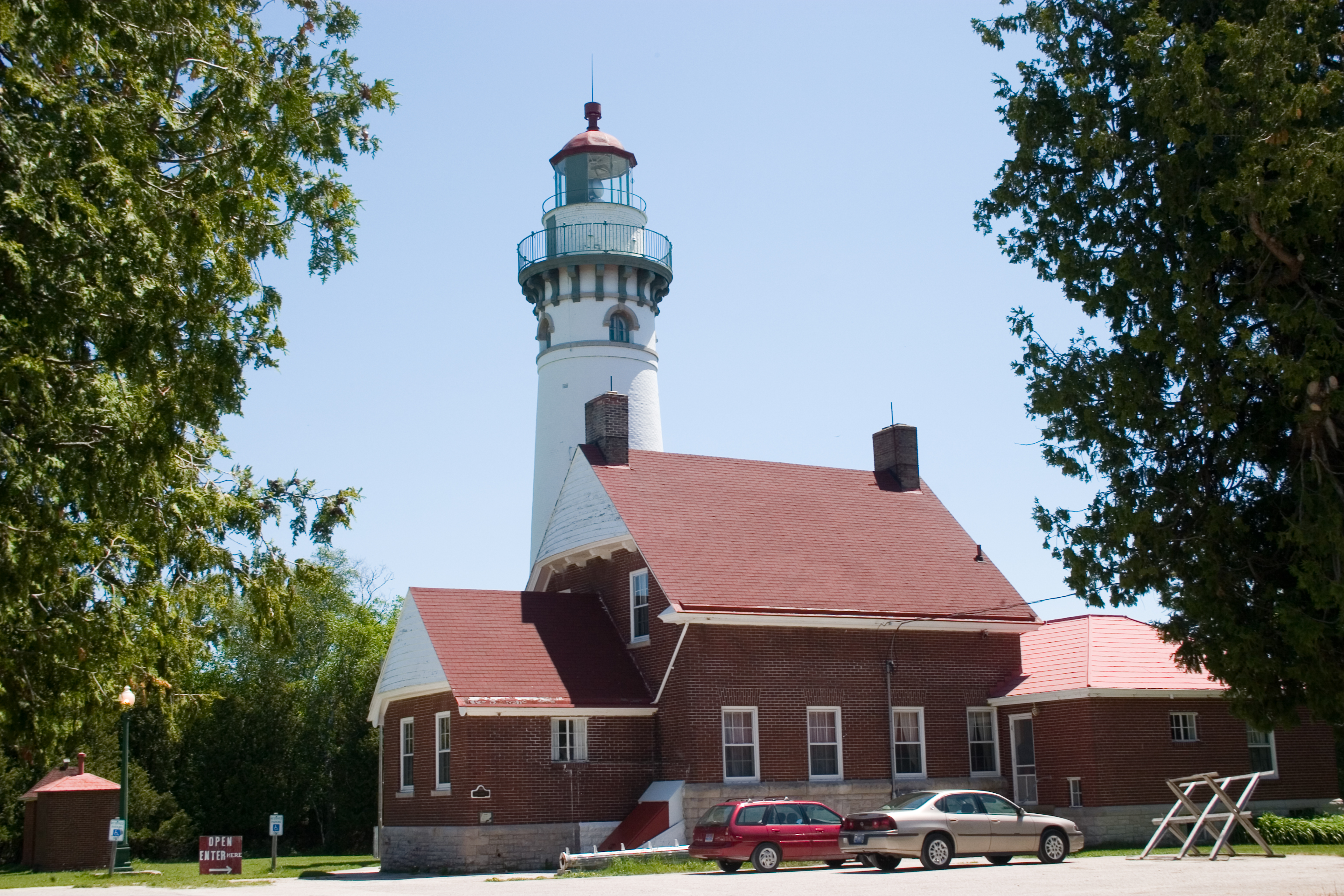
Seul Choix Light

=== Operation ===
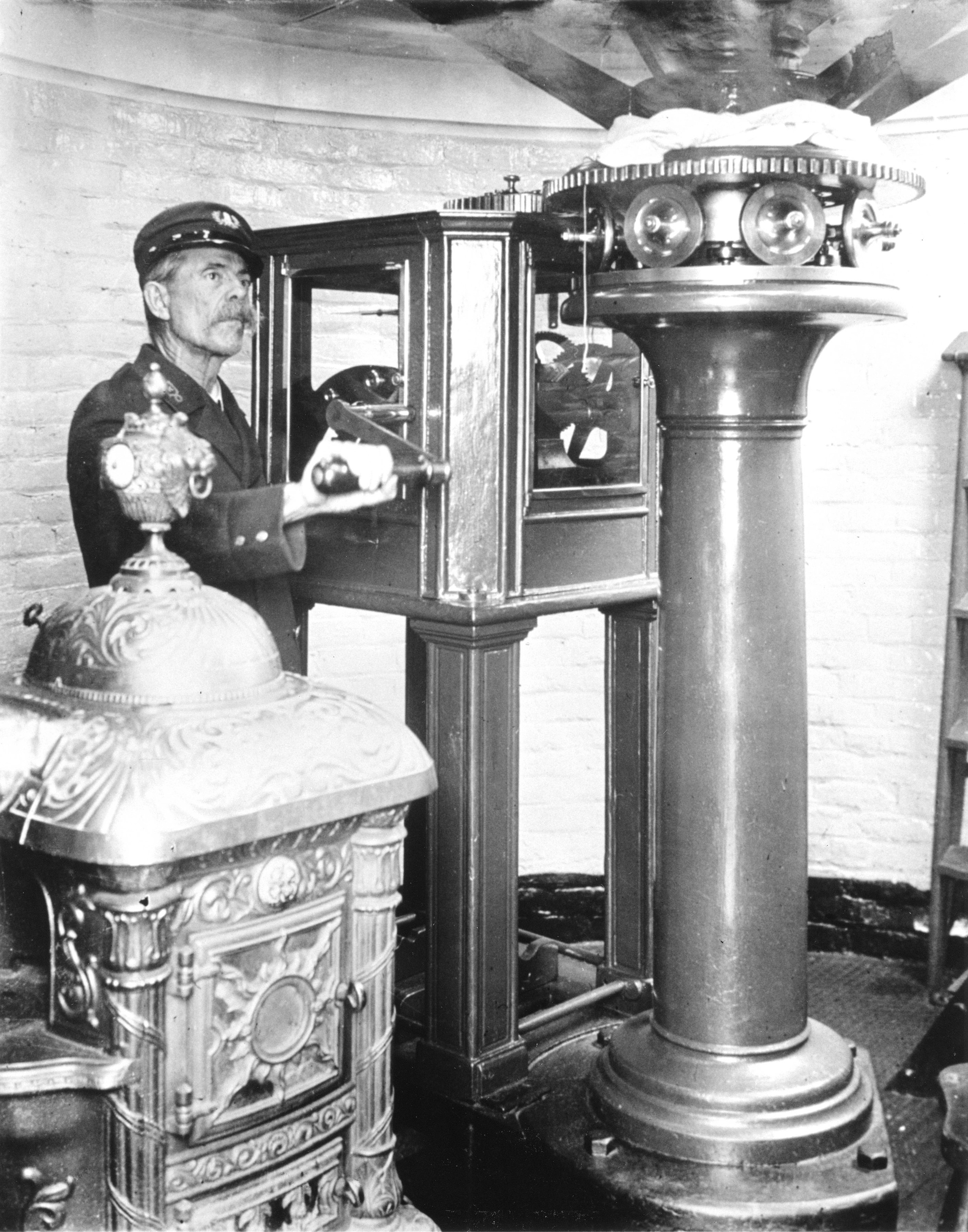
Keeper E.J. Moore with Fresnel mechanical flash mechanism (ca. 1918).

Until automation, the operation of lighthouses in America was the responsibility of keepers employed by the federal government through the United States Lighthouse Service (1789) until it was merged with the United States Coast Guard (1939). Today, there are many different organizational arrangements for management and operation of historic lighthouses around the world. The operational history and light keeping at Grosse Point Lighthouse is unique as there have been keepers appointed by both federal and local government.

Of all the federally appointed keepers, the best known and longest serving is Edwin James “E.J.” Moore, who entered the ranks of the lighthouse service as an assistant keeper at Grosse Point on September 9, 1883 before a transfer took him to the Calumet (IL) lighthouse on August 21, 1884. He later returned to Grosse Point as principle keeper serving from August 27, 1888 until his death on March 2, 1924. Like all Principle keepers of the period the primary duties Moore dealt with was making sure that Grosse Point’s second-order Fresnel lens was properly maintained and that its life-saving beacon of light worked continuously from sunset to sunrise. During the peak years of operation, the principle keeper was aided by two assistant keepers and a day laborer who was tasked with maintaining the light and fog signals. Work of secondary importance would be performed by asst. keepers and consist of chores such as polishing brass and copper, cleaning windows, and organizing storage areas. During his years of service, E.J. adopted the title of “Captain” along with a reportedly stern manner in dealing with his subordinate keepers. This contrasted with a congenial side to his professional personality when dealing with news reporters who frequently sought him out for his views on maritime issues, enjoying the stories he would tell.

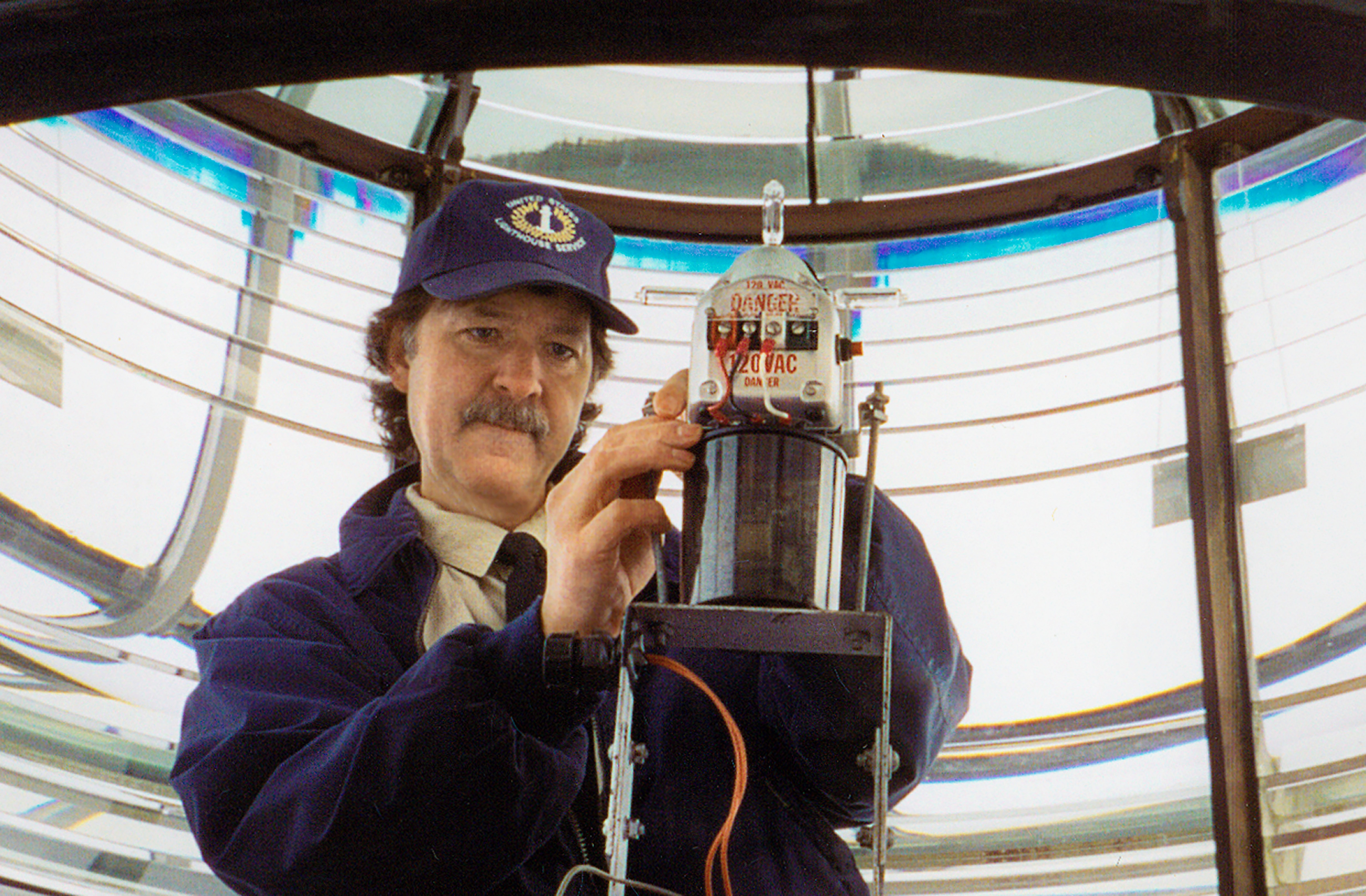
Heritage Keeper, Don Terras, installs a beacon flasher, 2007.

One hundred years after the appointment of E.J. Moore, Donald J. “D.J.” Terras became Keeper of Grosse Point Lighthouse on April 28, 1983. This local government appointment was made by the Board of Commissioners of the Lighthouse Park District of Evanston which oversees operation of the light as a private aid to navigation (#20190, USCG Light List). A century aside, Terras’ position requires some of the same work-related duties as Keeper Moore such as making sure that the original Fresnel lens operates properly, filing government paperwork, and hiring contractors. But Don Terras was hired at a time when there was strong national sentiment to preserve and interpret historic lighthouses and he was at the forefront of a new generation of so-called “Heritage” Keepers. In pursuing these activities, Mr. Terras supplemented a small tax-generated budget with grant money and successfully lobbied for establishment of a lighthouse preservation fund for public donations to restore and interpret the history of Grosse Point Lighthouse. Like E.J. Moore, he developed a rapport with news reporters who used a wide variety of media to write about his work, the lighthouse, and his personal life that included teaching, publishing books (The Grosse Point Lighthouse and Lighthouses of Chicago Harbor - Their History, Architecture and Lore), completing his term as president of the American Lighthouse Council, and writing the successful nomination of Grosse Point Lighthouse as a National Historic Landmark.

=== Deactivation and conversion to private aid to navigation ===
In 1935, the federal government turned over the grounds and the buildings, except for the lighthouse tower and light, to the city of Evanston. In 1941, the Grosse Point Light Station was decommissioned by the United States Coast Guard as a precaution against possible air raids in the wake of the attack on Pearl Harbor. After the decommissioning, the city received the tower and the light. But the lease allows the government to take the light station back if they ever needed it for official use.

The light was reignited in 1945 and has served as a secondary navigational aid ever since. The lighthouse is operated by the Lighthouse Park District of Evanston, Illinois, once known as the Northeast Park District, but since renamed in honor of the lighthouse.

Illinois has two well-known and historic light stations in the Chicago area, plus two pierhead lights. In 2023, The Friends of the Chicago Harbor Lighthouse was formed to help “Preserve, Restore and Celebrate” this historically important Great Lakes Aid to Navigation. The Calumet Harbor Light—just across the border in Indiana, and one of eleven past or present lighthouses in Indiana— was demolished in 1995.

== Architecture and design ==
=== Light tower ===
The Gross Point Light's primary structure is the conical light tower. The tower stands on a concrete foundation with wooden piles that reach to a depth of 30 feet (9.1 m). The tower's two outer walls include an inner air space between them. The inner wall has a thickness of 8 inches (200 mm) and rises vertically. The outer wall, at a thickness of 12 inches (300 mm), rises at a slight incline and gives the tower its conical shape. The tower begins with a 22-foot (6.7 m) circumference at its base and 13 feet 3 inches (4.04 m) at its parapet. The tower lantern is of glass and iron construction and is topped by a copper sheeting roof.

=== Lantern and optics ===
The second order Fresnel lens /freɪˈnɛl/ is the largest lens (one of five) placed on the Great Lakes, which underscores the importance of this light. The lens was manufactured by Henry-Lepaute Company of Paris. It is still in place, which makes it unique; it has been said that this is the single remaining 2nd Order Fresnel lens that is still in place and in service on the Great Lakes.

This is one of only 70 such Fresnel lenses that are still operational in the United States, sixteen of which are in use on the Great Lakes, of which eight are in Michigan.

== Grosse Point legends ==
The site of the Grosse Point Lighthouse is the purported site where Father Jacques Marquette landed in 1674 during his trip down the west side of Lake Michigan to visit various Illinois Native American tribes. This tale is largely anecdotal as there is no real historical proof that this ever occurred.

There is also an interesting legend associated with the Fresnel lens at Grosse Point. This lens was one of three purchased from France in 1860. One was sent to California, and the remaining two went to Florida where new lighthouses were under construction. The Civil War was fast approaching and, according to the story, federal troops wanted to safeguard the lenses and so they were buried in an isolated spot before the war and were later retrieved and sent to Washington D.C. In 1874 one of the historic two was installed at Grosse Point Lighthouse. There is little documentation to substantiate or disprove that the chain of events actually occurred. The Evanston Index for October 23, 1880, reported that Mr. Crump, an official lampist for the Lighthouse Establishment’s Twelfth District, was in town and had “confirmed the explosion of the pretty fiction which long obtained here, concerning the burying of our Evanston light in the sands during the Civil War.” Official as his statement might seem, there currently are no records available to prove the incident did not take place.

In March of 1915 lighthouse keeper George Sheridan arrived at the Grosse Point Lighthouse. Shortly after his arrival at the lighthouse, he took a walk and never returned. He was discovered dead, hanging from a rafter in the boathouse at the lighthouse. Present day tours report sightings of spirits.

== Current activities ==
The keeper's house with the light behind it in 2020

The light is 13 miles (21 km) north of Chicago, just north of Northwestern University. The dwelling and tower are opened during summer weekends for tours.

== See also ==
- Lighthouses in the United States
- National Historic Lighthouse Preservation Act
- List of National Historic Landmarks in Illinois
