= Molokaʻi Light =

Lighthouse in Kalawao County, Hawaii

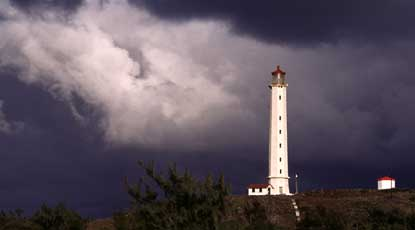
- Molokaʻi Light in 2009
- Location: Kalaupapa Peninsula, Kalawao County, Hawaii, United States
- Coordinates: 21°12′44″N 156°58′21″W

Tower
- Constructed: 1908–1909
- Construction: Reinforced concrete
- Automated: 1966
- Height: 138 feet (42 m)
- Shape: Octagonal tower with lantern and gallery
- Markings: White tower, red lantern
- Operator: National Park Service (Kalaupapa National Historical Park); light operated by the United States Coast Guard
- Heritage: National Register of Historic Places listed place

Light
- First lit: 1909
- Focal height: 213 feet (65 m)
- Lens: Second-order bivalve Fresnel lens by Chance Brothers (1909–1986)
- Range: 13 nmi (24 km; 15 mi)
- Characteristic: Fl W 10s
- U.S. Coast Guard Molokai Light
- U.S. National Register of Historic Places
- Hawaiʻi Register of Historic Places
- Location: N of Kalaupapa, Kalaupapa, Hawaii
- Built: 1909
- Part of: Kalaupapa Leprosy Settlement
- NRHP reference No.: 82001724
- HRHP No.: 50-60-03-01036

Significant dates
- Added to NRHP: March 25, 1982
- Designated HRHP: March 25, 1982

Molokaʻi Light, also known as the U.S. Coast Guard Molokai Light, is a lighthouse at the northern tip of the Kalaupapa Peninsula on the island of Molokaʻi, in Kalawao County, Hawaii. First lit on September 1, 1909, it was built as a landfall light for ships bound from Honolulu from the west coast of the United States. Standing at 138 feet (42 m) tall including its base and lantern, it is the tallest lighthouse in the Hawaiian Islands. The station was built besides the Kalaupapa Leprosy Settlement, leading to its keepers suffering isolation when the lighthouse was staffed. The light was automated in 1966 and is currently owned by the National Park Service, while the United States Coast Guard operates an automated light in the tower. It was listed on the National Register of Historic Places in 1982.

== History ==
=== Background ===
Before annexation, the Kingdom of Hawaii maintained only minor lights on Molokai. In 1902 a Congressional investigation found that most Pacific coast shipping passed through the channel between Oahu and Molokai, which had only a single light at Diamond Head. The Kalaupapa Peninsula was found to be a natural site for a landfall light. Beginning in 1903, the United States Lighthouse Board repeatedly requested funding for lights at both Makapuʻu Point on Oʻahu and the Kalaupapa Peninsula, with funding for the Kalaupapa light being repeatedly denied due to a combination of cost and a fear of the site's closeness to the Kalaupapa Leprosy Settlement. While waiting for Congress to approve funding, the Lighthouse Board placed a temporary light (Makanalua Light) on the peninsula. This light opened on March 1, 1906.

=== Construction (1907–1909) ===
Congress authorized $60,000 (equivalent to $2,073,214 in 2025) in funding for a permanent light station on February 26, 1907. The station's land was formally acquired the following year by Executive Order 962, which was signed by President Theodore Roosevelt. Construction began in June 1908 and was completed in 1909. The construction process was dangerous, with at least one worker dying in an accident, and the project's foreman describing the site as a prison. The lighthouse became operational on September 1, 1909.

=== Keepers and the settlement (1909–1939) ===
The station was staffed by a head keeper and two assistants, all of whom lived on-site with their families. In 1917, the head keeper lost his right hand in an accident when a stick of dynamite being used to kill a shark exploded early. Keepers were kept isolated from the leper colony, which was draining on them socially. In recognition of their isolation, they were paid more than other lighthouse keepers on Hawaii and received a full month of annual leave. In practice, however, these rules were routinely violated by keepers, who socialized and even played baseball with patients at the colony. Patients would occasionally visit the lighthouse and pass the keeper's children candy through the fence.

The lighthouse site was expanded multiple times after construction, with a garage, stone wall, and airstrip being constructed between 1910 and 1933. The airstrip later became the site of the Kalaupapa Airport. Keeping at the lighthouse was dangerous, with earthquakes causing the light's mercury vat to spill on multiple occasions.

=== Coast Guard era and automation (1939–1966) ===
On July 7, 1939, the United States Lighthouse Service was merged into the United States Coast Guard, resulting in the lighthouse coming under military command. After the attack on Pearl Harbor, the tower's light was extinguished so that the tower could be used as a lookout for enemy ships and aircraft. In 1942 the tower's staffing was reduced from three keepers to two and, by 1960, there was only a single keeper assigned to the tower. The Coast Guard began planning to automated the lighthouse in 1959 and reclassified the station to only accept single keepers without families in 1960. The lighthouse became fully automatic on August 1, 1966, and most of the station's land was sold in 1971.

=== Removal and return of the lens (1982–1993) ===
The tower was found to be in a state of disrepair in the 1980s, with the Coast Guard proposing to replace the lens and remove the risk of mercury contamination. The lens was replaced in 1986, with the original lens being shipped to Lahaina on the USCGC Mallow for public display. After residents of Kalaupapa reacted negatively to the removal of the lens, it was shipped back in 1993 and stored in the station's old garage.

=== National Park Service (1993–Present) ===
The land surrounding the lighthouse was conveyed to the National Park Service for purposes of the Kalaupapa National Historical Park in 1980. In 2003, under the National Historic Lighthouse Preservation Act, the lighthouse itself was transferred to the Park Service. Several of the keeper's buildings have been restored, with the park's preservation specialist receiving the 2022 Pacific West regional Award for Cultural Resources for his efforts. Public access to the peninsula is restricted and the grounds and tower are closed to visitors.

== Description ==
The lighthouse stands near the northern tip of the Kalaupapa Peninsula, near the Kalaupapa Airport. The tower itself is an octagonal shell of reinforced concrete which stands 112 feet (34 m) above a 30-foot (9 m) platform. The tower tapes from 20 feet (6 m) across at the base to about 14 feet (4 m) at the top. The inside of the tower contained a shaft that drove the lens' clockwork, along with a 189-step staircase. The lighthouse's lantern consists of a clamshell lens in a bronze frame. The keeper's dwelling is a Craftsman-style cottage that was constructed from stone harvest at the site.

== Heritage designations ==
The lighthouse was included in the National Historic Landmark district for the Kalaupapa Leprosy Settlement, which was listed in 1976. It was nominated separately, by the Coast Guard's 14th District, in 1977, and was placed on the National Register of Historic Places in 1982. It is also listed on the Hawaiʻi Register of Historic Places and the Historic American Buildings Survey.
