= Burlington Breakwater Lights =

Burlington Breakwater North Light
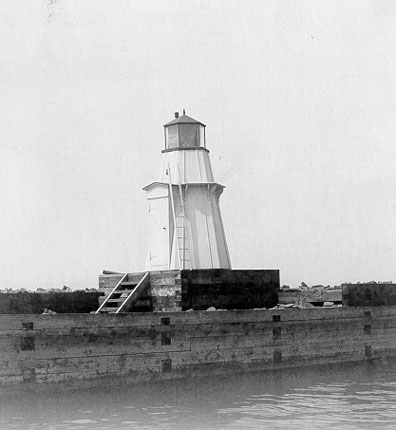
- Location: Burlington, United States
- Coordinates: 44°28′50″N 73°13′47″W

Tower
- Constructed: 1857
- Foundation: breakwater
- Construction: lumber
- Shape: square pyramid
- Markings: White

Light
- First lit: 2003 (current tower, which is a replica of 1890 tower)
- Focal height: 35 ft (11 m)
- Range: 12 nmi (22 km; 14 mi)
- Characteristic: Fl R 2.5s
- Burlington Breakwater South Light
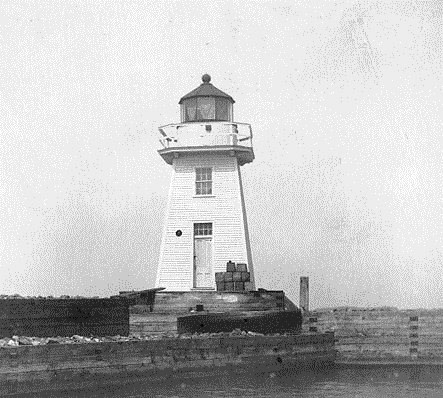
- modern replica lighthouse, lit in 2004
- Constructed: 1857
- Foundation: breakwater
- Construction: lumber
- Shape: square pyramid
- Markings: White
- First lit: 2003 (current tower, which is a replica of 1857 tower)
- Focal height: 12 ft (3.7 m)
- Range: 7 nmi (13 km; 8.1 mi)
- Characteristic: Fl W 4s

The Burlington Breakwater Lights were originally established in 1857 to mark the ends of a low, detached, two piece breakwater 2/3-nautical-mile (1.2 km; 0.77 mi) long which protects the Burlington, Vermont harbor from Lake Champlain. The breakwater is on the National Register of Historic Places, but the lights, being replicas, are not. The two lights were replaced and rebuilt several times as fire and ice took their toll. In the middle of the 20th century, the wood towers were replaced by steel skeleton towers. The City of Burlington arranged for Federal funding for replicas of the original towers which were activated on September 12, 2003.
