= Presque Isle Light =

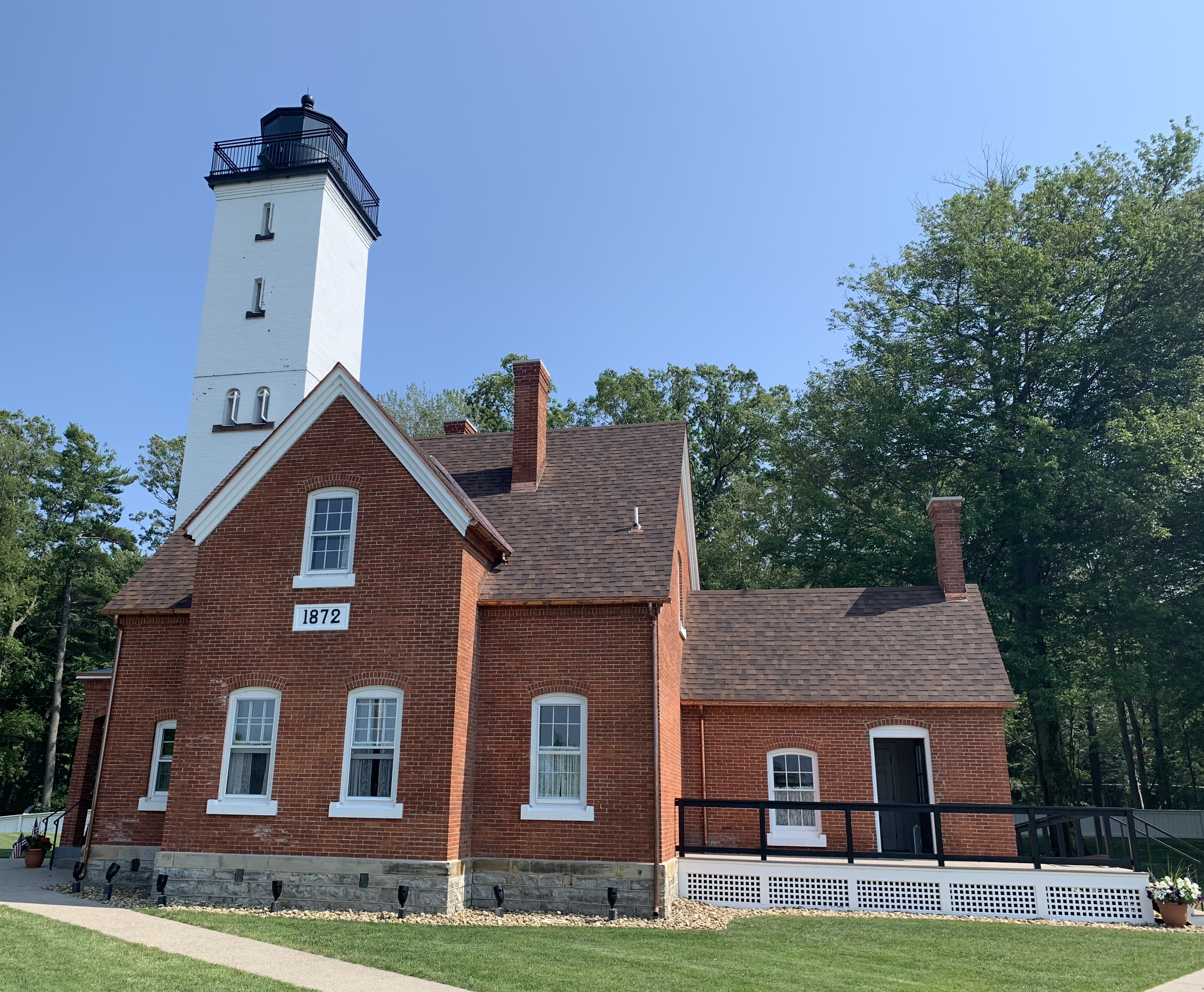
- Location: Presque Isle State Park; Erie, Pennsylvania; United States
- Coordinates: 42°9′56.8″N 80°6′55.5″W

Tower
- Constructed: 1872
- Construction: Brick
- Automated: 1962
- Height: 58 ft (18 m)
- Shape: Square
- Markings: Solid white
- Heritage: Listed on the NRHP

Light
- First lit: 12 July 1873
- Focal height: 63 ft (19 m)
- Lens: 4th-order Fresnel
- Range: 15 nmi (17 mi; 28 km)
- Characteristic: Iso W 6s

U.S. National Register of Historic Places
- Designated: August 4, 1983
- Part of: United States Coast Guard Lighthouses and Light Stations on the Great Lakes Thematic Resource
- Reference no.: 83002242

The Presque Isle Light, historically nicknamed the "Flash Light", is a lighthouse on the shore of Lake Erie in U.S. state of Pennsylvania. It is one of three lighthouses in Erie, along with the Erie Land Light and the North Pier Light. The lighthouse is situated on the northern shoreline of Presque Isle State Park overlooking the beach.

The lighthouse became active on July 12, 1873 and was listed on the National Register of Historic Places in 1983.

== Design ==
The Presque Isle Light is 68 feet (21 m) tall with a focal height of 63 feet (19 m). Originally, the tower was only 40 feet (12 m) tall before it was raised to its current height. It has a light characteristic consisting of a 6-second, white isophase light (3 seconds on, 3 seconds off) that is visible up to 15 nautical miles (17 mi; 28 km) from the lighthouse. Up until August 2013, a backup, emergency light was mounted below the main beacon that would flash every 10 seconds at a "reduced intensity" if the main beacon was non-operational. Around the same time as the removal of the emergency light, the main beacon was replaced with a six-tier, light-emitting diode, Vega marine beacon.

The lighthouse tower is attached a four-bedroom residence used by the lighthouse keeper. The whale oil and, eventually, kerosene necessary to keep the lighthouse illuminated for the entire night was stored in the room at the base of the stairs leading to the lantern room. For safety reasons, the rest of the fuel was stored in a shed located elsewhere on the property. After it was electrified, the oil room became the storage room for the batteries powering the light.

== History ==
In 1789, the United States Congress authorized the federal government to construct and maintain lighthouses and other navigational aids on the nation's waterways, as well as established the predecessor to the United States Lighthouse Service. The first two U.S. lighthouses on the Great Lakes were completed in 1818—one in Buffalo, New York and the Erie Land Light at the entrance to Presque Isle Bay. Ownership of the Presque Isle peninsula that formed the bay was transferred from a sailors' hospital to the federal government on May 17, 1871 "for the purposes of national defense and the protection of the harbor of Erie". By that time, the continuously shifting sands of Presque Isle had caused the peninsula to migrate and had begun to obscure mariners' views of the Land Light. Congress quickly appropriated $15,000 for the construction of a new "light-house [sic] on the north side of Presque Isle" on June 10, 1872.

=== Construction ===
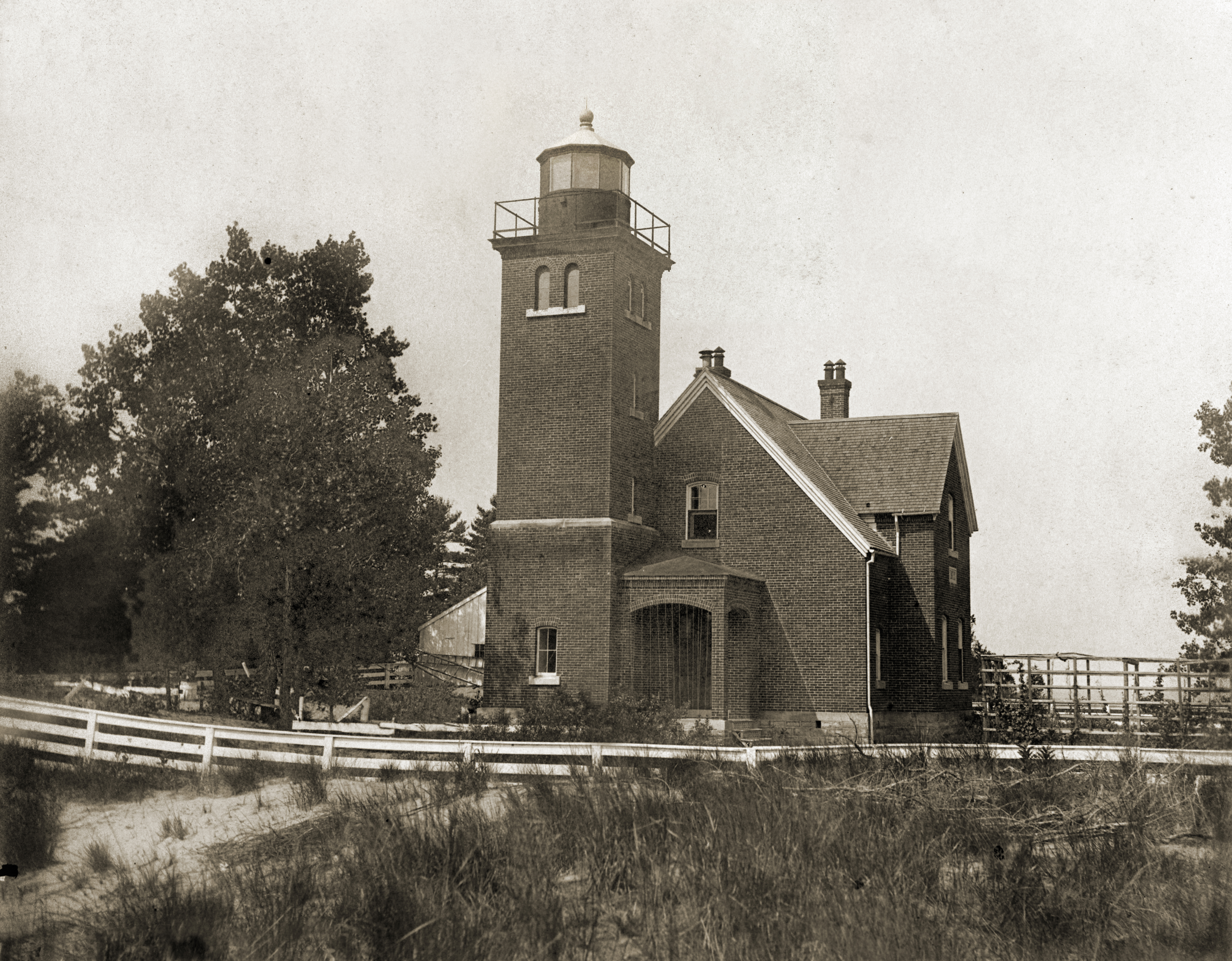
The Presque Isle Light in 1885, before the tower height was increased

Construction on the lighthouse was delayed until September 2, 1872 after the Lighthouse Board solicited bids and initially received none. Part of the problem lie in the relative isolation of Presque Isle, which would prove notoriously difficult to deliver building materials. No roads connected it to the mainland and, at times in its history, the peninsula would become an island. Originally, barges could be offloaded at the closest point to the lighthouse from Lake Erie. After one foundered in a storm and lost 6,000 bricks, the only recourse was to land on the bay-side and carry everything 1.5 miles (2.4 km) to the lighthouse site. The masonry of both of lighthouse tower and keeper's residence were completed by November 1873. Work was halted for the winter on December 2 and did not resume until April 16, 1873. The Presque Isle Light was completed on July 1, 1873.

Once finished, a fourth-order Fresnel lens was installed in the tower, and it went into operation on July 12—Charles Waldo, the Presque Isle Light's first keeper, noted in the log for that day: "This is a new light station and the light will be exhibited for the first time tonight. There was one visitor." The lighthouse originally produced a fixed, white light which flashed red every 60 seconds. In 1882, it was given a new set of lens and its characteristic was changed to an alternating red and white flash every 10 seconds. This signal pattern led the lighthouse to becoming nicknamed the "Flash Light" by Erie residents. Because the trees surrounding the lighthouse required annual trimming to keep the light visible, the decision was made in 1896 to increase the tower's height by 17 feet 4 inches (5.3 m). It took one month—from August 19 to September 18, 1896—for bricklayers to extend to the tower.

=== Electrification and automation ===
A single, 150-watt, incandescent light bulb illuminated the lighthouse beacon; it was visible up to 18 miles (29 km) after it was magnified by its Fresnel lens to 120,000 candlepower. In 1962, the lighthouse's Fresnel lens was removed and replaced with a modern marine beacon. At that time, the characteristic was changed to its current isophase light.

The Presque Isle Light was added to the National Register of Historic Places on August 4, 1983, as part of a group listing of lighthouses and light stations operated by the United States Coast Guard on the Great Lakes. The lighthouse was one of 17 declared government surplus by the Coast Guard in January 1997, and ownership of the Presque Isle Light was taken over by the Pennsylvania Department of Conservation and Natural Resources.

=== Restoration ===
On July 25, 2014, the Department of Conservation and Natural Resources transferred the Presque Isle Light, in a 35-year lease to a nonprofit organization charged with restoring and operating the lighthouse as a museum. The lighthouse was reopened to the public for tours in the summer of 2015. Renovations will see the 1989-additions, as well as most of the modern amenities, removed to return the lighthouse to its appearance in the late-1800s and early-1900s. The lighthouse is depicted on an optional "special organization" Pennsylvania license plate benefiting the Presque Isle Partnership.

== Keepers and residents ==
Lightkeepers
Charles T. Waldo	1872–1880
Orren J. McAllister	1880
George E. Town	1880–1883
Clark McCole	1883–1886
Lewis Vanatta	1886–1891
Louis Walrose	1891–1892
Thomas L. Wilkins	1892–1901
Andrew Shaw	1901–1927
Frank Huntington	1927–1944

When the Presque Isle Light opened, its first keepers were paid $520 per year, and were entitled to use the "snug" residence attached to the lighthouse.

From 1974 to 1986, the Coast Guard used the Presque Isle Light as supplemental housing and assigned it to personnel and their families. As it was fully automated, guardsmen housed at the light were only required to inspect the beacon during "unusual electrical storms." After its last residents vacated the lighthouse in June 1986 and, rather than constantly repair it, the Coast Guard chose to close the keeper's residence. The Pennsylvania Department of Conservation and Natural Resources opted to house state park officials in the lighthouse until 2014.

== See also ==
- List of lighthouses in the United States
- National Register of Historic Places listings in Erie County, Pennsylvania

== Sources ==
- Bates, Samuel P; Brown, R. C; Russell, N. W; Weakley, F. E; Whitman, Benjamin (1884). History of Erie County, Pennsylvania. Chicago: Warner and Beers.
- Brandon, Loretta A (1997). Lightkeeper's Legacy: A Personal History of Presque Isle. Erie, Pennsylvania: Erie County Historical Society. ISBN 1-883658-34-9.
- Freeman, Sabina Shields (October 1986). "The Presque Isle Lighthouse". Pennsylvania Magazine. 5 (3): 49–52. ISSN 0744-4230.
- Hyde, Charles K (October 15, 1979). "United States Coast Lighthouses and Light Stations on the Great Lakes". National Register of Historic Places Inventory—Nomination Form. National Park Service.
- "Presque Isle Light". Maritime Heritage Program. National Park Service. March 1, 2002. Archived from the original on September 1, 2013.
- Reed, John Elmer (1925). History of Erie County, Pennsylvania. Vol. 1. Topeka, Kansas: Historical Publishing Co.
- Richardson, William A (1873). Annual Report on the State of the Finances to the Forty-Third Congress, First Session, December 1, 1873. Washington, DC: Government Printing Office.
- Sullivan, Harold (March 23, 1946). "Presque Isle Lighthouse Keepers Always on the Job". Erie Daily Times. pp. 5, 18.
- United States Lighthouse Board (1882). Annual Report of the Light-House Board to the Secretary of the Treasury for the Fiscal Year Ended June 30, 1882. Washington, DC: Government Printing Office.
- United States Lighthouse Board (1896). Annual Report of the Light-House Board to the Secretary of the Treasury for the Fiscal Year Ended June 30, 1896. Washington, DC: Government Printing Office.
- United States Coast Guard; United States Department of Homeland Security (2024). Light List: Great Lakes (PDF). Vol. VII. Washington, DC: Government Printing Office. COMDTPUB P16502.7.
