= Erie Harbor North Pier Light =

Lighthouse in Pennsylvania, United States

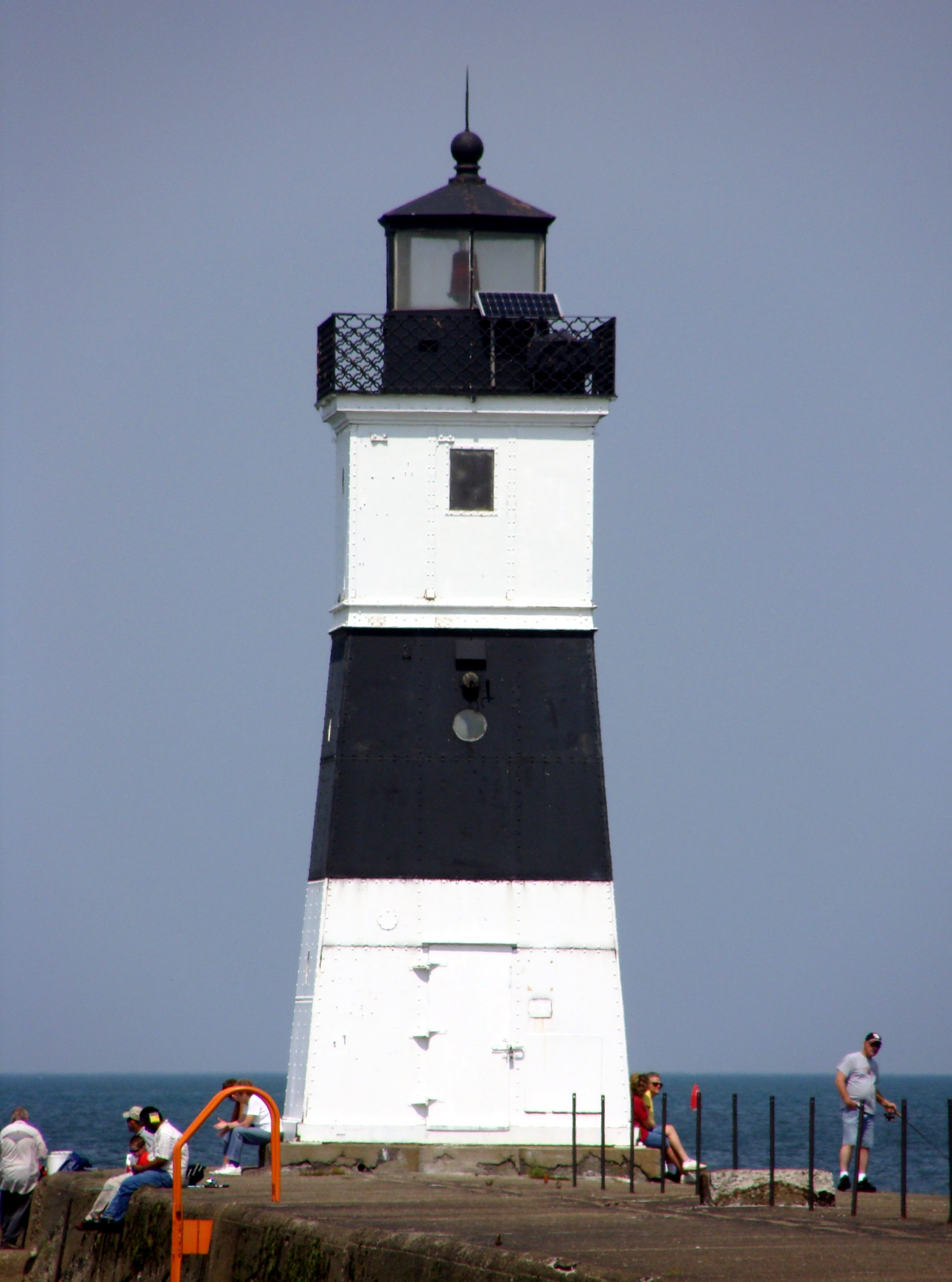
- Location: Presque Isle, Pennsylvania, United States
- Coordinates: 42°09′24″N 80°04′14″W

Tower
- Constructed: 1858
- Construction: wrought iron, steel
- Automated: 1995
- Height: 34 ft (10 m)
- Shape: square pyramid
- Markings: White, black (stripe)
- Operator: United States Coast Guard

Light
- Focal height: 13 m (43 ft)
- Lens: fourth order Fresnel lens (–1995)
- Range: 6 nmi (11 km; 6.9 mi)
- Characteristic: Fl R 2.5s (1995–), F R (–1995)

The Erie Harbor North Pier Light, also known as the Presque Isle North Pier Light, is one of the three lighthouses near Erie, Pennsylvania in the United States. The light, situated at the far eastern end of Presque Isle State Park, helps mariners as they traverse the narrow inlet between Lake Erie and Presque Isle Bay.

Originally constructed as a wooden tower in 1830, that light was swept away by a schooner in 1857. The current structure was forged in France and assembled on site in Erie. It was moved in 1882 and again in 1940. The United States Coast Guard, which operates the beacon, changed its fixed red beam to an automated red flashing light in 1995, at which time the 4th order Fresnel lens was sent to the Erie Maritime Museum. In 2021, the lighthouse was featured on a postage stamp as part of the Mid-Atlantic Lighthouse series done by the United States Postal Service. The image of the light on the stamp was one of the last works done by artist Howard Koslow.

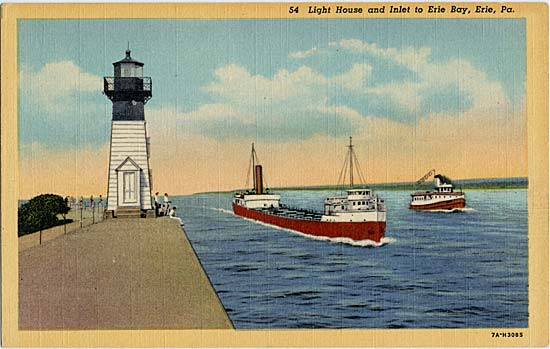
Light on a pre-1930 postcard
