= List of shipwrecks in 1953 =

The list of shipwrecks in 1953 includes ships sunk, foundered, grounded, or otherwise lost during 1953.

table of contents
1953
Jan	Feb	Mar	Apr
May	Jun	Jul	Aug
Sep	Oct	Nov	Dec
Unknown date

== January ==
=== 1 January ===
List of shipwrecks: 1 January 1953
Ship	State	Description
Attu Island	United States	Carrying a cargo of 5,000 tons of cement and damaged earlier in her voyage when she struck a reef off Pennock Island in Southeast Alaska while under tow by the tug Hercules (United States), the 328-foot (100.0 m) LST-type barge capsized and sank bottom-up 0.5 nautical miles (0.93 km) south of Bar Harbor in Ketchikan, Territory of Alaska. An attempt during the 1970s to refloat her failed.

=== 4 January ===
List of shipwrecks: 4 January 1953
Ship	State	Description
Larraiz	Spain	The 130-foot (40 m), 300-ton trawler was wrecked between Cape Blanco and Cape Barbas, Spanish Possessions in the Sahara (21°45′N 17°00′W).

=== 5 January ===
List of shipwrecks: 5 January 1953
Ship	State	Description
Dairi Maru	Japan	The cargo ship sank in a collision in Kurushima Strait.

=== 6 January ===
List of shipwrecks: 6 January 1953
Ship	State	Description
Frederik	Netherlands	The cargo ship sank in a collision 7 miles (11 km) north of IJmuiden.
Kelvinbank	United Kingdom	The Liberty ship was driven onto a reef and the wreck of Ooma (Gilbert Islands) on Ocean Island, Gilbert Islands. Attempts to refloat her ended on 16 January when she broke in two and was abandoned.

=== 7 January ===
List of shipwrecks: 7 January 1953
Ship	State	Description
R. P. S.	Netherlands	The cargo ship sank after her cargo shifted 60 miles (97 km) southwest of Ushant.

=== 8 January ===
List of shipwrecks: 8 January 1953
Ship	State	Description
Avanti	Sweden	The 10,000-ton tanker broke in two north east of Okinawa, Japan (28°11′N 132°03′E) in a gale. Eleven crew rescued by Eastern and 21 by Kanazu Maru (Japan). Her captain, chief engineer and six messboys died.
Klipfontein	Netherlands	Klipfontein The cargo liner struck a submerged reef 100 nautical miles (190 km) north of Lourenço Marques, Mozambique (24°32′S 35°14′E) and sank. All passengers and crew rescued by Bloemfontein Castle (United Kingdom).
Maraat V	Netherlands	The cargo ship ran aground at Sea Palling, Norfolk, United Kingdom. Refloated on 9 January after being aground for 28 hours.

=== 9 January ===
List of shipwrecks: 9 January 1953
Ship	State	Description
Changgyeong-ho	South Korea	According to South Korea Coast Guard official confirmed report, the passenger ferry, while sailing from Yeosu Port and headed to Busan Port, capsized 8 kilometres (5.0 mi) southwest from Dadaepo area, Busan, South Korea. 229 people died and only seven people survived.
Jumper Hitch	United States	The cargo ship collided with another vessel off Japan. Reported to be in danger of sinking and requested assistance.
Triago	Spain	The 422-ton cargo ship sprung a leak and foundered in the Mediterranean Sea (40°34′N 1°16′E).
RFA Wave Commander	Royal Navy	The Wave-class oiler ran aground off Cape Henry, Virginia, United States.

=== 10 January ===
List of shipwrecks: 10 January 1953
Ship	State	Description
Selbarden	Norway	The 499-ton cargo vessel caught fire in the engine room and was beached at Vestfjorden. Refloated, repaired and returned to service as East Star.

=== 11 January ===
List of shipwrecks: 11 January 1953
Ship	State	Description
Campo Grande	Spain	The cargo ship ran aground off the Cork Lightship, off the coast of Essex, United Kingdom.

=== 12 January ===
List of shipwrecks: 12 January 1953
Ship	State	Description
Stella Maris	Netherlands	The cargo ship sank in a collision off The Naze.

=== 13 January ===
List of shipwrecks: 13 January 1953
Ship	State	Description
Bertrix	Norway	The 297-ton cargo ship ran aground at Stokoya. She was re-floated & beached at Stokksund but subsequently sank, possibly during the Great Flood of 1953 at the end of the month.
Eleonore	West Germany	The cargo ship stranded 10 miles (16 km) south of Gothenburg in fog and later sank in heavy weather.
Gullo	Sweden	The cargo ship struck a submerged rock and sank at 54°37′N 12°23′E.

=== 15 January ===
List of shipwrecks: 15 January 1953
Ship	State	Description
American Leader	United States	The cargo ship collided with Chickasaw (United States) in New York Harbor. American Leader was severely damaged at the bow.
American Veteran	United States	The cargo ship was in collision with the ferry Gold Star Mother in New York Harbor. Both ships were damaged, with Gold Star Mother taking in water by the bows and having eleven of her 1,900 passengers injured.
Esso Wilmington	United States	The tanker ran aground in New York Harbor.
Sunlight	United Kingdom	The trawler was wrecked on rocks in fog at Murble Point, Caithness.

=== 17 January ===
List of shipwrecks: 17 January 1953
Ship	State	Description
L F Mathies	West Germany	The cargo ship ran aground off Portishead, Somerset, United Kingdom. Later refloated and docked at Avonmouth.

=== 18 January ===
List of shipwrecks: 18 January 1953
Ship	State	Description
City of San Diego	United States	The fishing vessel burned and sank 33 miles (53 km) southeast of Coronados.
Santi	Spain	The cargo ship was in collision with British Dragoon (United Kingdom) and sank off Cape Espichel, Portugal. Thirty-six survivors rescued by British Dragoon.

=== 19 January ===
List of shipwrecks: 19 January 1953
Ship	State	Description
Maria Lina	West Germany	The cargo ship was sunk by a naval mine in the Oster Ems in dense fog. The wreck was found on 20 January.

=== 21 January ===
List of shipwrecks: 21 January 1953
Ship	State	Description
Arklow	flag unknown	The coaster ran aground off Avonmouth. Refloated the next day.
Palomares	United Kingdom	The cargo ship ran aground off Avonmouth. Refloated the next day.

=== 23 January ===
List of shipwrecks: 23 January 1953
Ship	State	Description
Kent County	Norway	The ore carrier ran aground at Bell Island, Nova Scotia, Canada.
Tirrenia	Finland	The cargo ship caught fire causing her cargo of ammonium nitrate to explode in the Red Sea. The crew safely abandoned ship before she exploded.

=== 25 January ===
List of shipwrecks: 25 January 1953
Ship	State	Description
Empress of Canada	United Kingdom	The ocean liner caught fire, capsized and sank at Liverpool, Lancashire. Refloated and scrapped in 1954.

=== 26 January ===
List of shipwrecks: 26 January 1953
Ship	State	Description
Camarones	United States	The fishing vessel was wrecked on Cay Corker near British Honduras.

=== 28 January ===
List of shipwrecks: 28 January 1953
Ship	State	Description
Hoy Fatt	(Malaysia) Federation of Malaya	The 148-ton cargo vessel was wrecked in the Indian Ocean at 07°59′N 93°54′E.

=== 31 January ===
List of shipwrecks: 31 January 1953
Ship	State	Description
HMS Berkeley Castle	Royal Navy	The Castle-class corvette capsized in Sheerness Dockyard.
Catharina Duyvis	Netherlands	North Sea flood of 1953: The trawler sank in the North Sea, last reported 18 miles (29 km) north west of IJmuiden. There were 16 fatalities.
Clan Macquarrie	United Kingdom	North Sea flood of 1953: The 425.1-foot (129.6 m), 7,131-ton cargo ship was beset by hurricane force winds, sleet and snow gusting over 160 km/h (100 mph), was driven ashore on the north west coast of the Isle of Lewis near the village of Borve, Lewis 10 nautical miles (19 km) off the Butt of Lewis, Outer Hebrides. All 66 crew were rescued by Stornoway Lifesaving Corps. Refloated 16 March and after inspection was scrapped.
Guava	United Kingdom	North Sea flood of 1953: The 285-ton motor trawler and her crew of eleven sank at roughly 53°50′N 3°0′E (100 nautical miles (190 km) east of the River Humber) in heavy gales during the night to 1 February.
Leopold Nera	Belgium	North Sea flood of 1953: The 58-ton trawler sank in the storm. Lost with all five crew.
Michael Griffith	United Kingdom	North Sea flood of 1953: The sold off Castle-class trawler from Fleetwood, Lancashire, foundered in a Force 10 snowstorm with rough seas and 30-foot (9.1 m) waves 7 to 8 miles (11 to 13 km) off Barra Head, West Scotland, with the loss of all 13 crew.
Princess Victoria	United Kingdom	North Sea flood of 1953: The roll-on/roll-off passenger ferry sank in the North Channel during a severe windstorm. There were 133 fatalities, and 44 survivors. Survivors rescued by "Lairds Moor", "Orchy", "Pass of Drumochter", and "Eastcoates". Eachcoates rescued 1 survivor and retrieved 6 bodies.
Salland	Netherlands	North Sea flood of 1953: The 295-ton coastal trading vessel sank in the North Sea near Egmond during the severe windstorm. The vessel was last sighted off Prawle Point on 29 January. There were eight fatalities.
Sheldon	United Kingdom	North Sea flood of 1953: The 280-ton motor trawler was last reported 60 miles (97 km) northwest of Dennis Head. Lost with all 14 crew.
Terra Nova	United Kingdom	North Sea flood of 1953: The 160-ton vessel went ashore at Wells-next-the-Sea.
Unknown lightship	Unknown	North Sea flood of 1953: A derelict lightship broke free from her tow and went aground on the English coast.
Westland	Netherlands	North Sea flood of 1953: The 426-ton coastal trading vessel sank in the North Sea. Last sighted near Cuxhaven on 30 January. There were ten fatalities.
Yewvalley	United Kingdom	North Sea flood of 1953: The 823-ton coaster was last reported off Cromer. Lost with all 12 crew. The wreck, found off Cromer, was reasonably identified as Yewvalley in 2012, in 27–34 metres (89–112 ft) of water and showing evidence of being sunk by a naval mine.

=== Unknown date ===
List of shipwrecks: unknown January 1953
Ship	State	Description
Abba	Denmark	The 100.5-foot (30.6 m), 149-ton cargo/fishing vessel departed Kopervik, Karmoy, on 16 January. Her boat and floating debris were discovered off Rugsund, Bremanger, on 18 January. Presumed to have sunk in heavy weather in Froysjoen Fjord near the Halenes Lighthouse. Lost with all eight hands.
Dan	Sweden	The cargo ship was last sighted 14 January off Rixholt.
Maria Ceretti	Italy	The tugboat was lost sometime in January.

== February ==
=== 1 February ===
List of shipwrecks: 1 February 1953
Ship	State	Description
Aspo	Sweden	North Sea flood of 1953: The steamer sank in heavy weather in the North Sea. She last made radio contact at 55°57′N 4°00′E. Lost with all 22 crew.
RFA Olcades	Royal Fleet Auxiliary	North Sea flood of 1953: The derelict 10,000-ton Ol-class tanker broke loose from her tow and went ashore at Bacton Gap. The vessel was then shifted by the wind to Ostend Gap, Happisburgh, Norfolk. Refloated on 16 April and scrapped later.
HMS Sirdar	Royal Navy	The S-class submarine was swamped by floods while in drydock at Sheerness Dockyard and sank. She was later raised, repaired, and returned to service.

=== 7 February ===
List of shipwrecks: 7 February 1953
Ship	State	Description
G R Y	Denmark	The 257-ton cargo vessel stranded and sank in heavy weather off Skudeneshavn.

=== 10 February ===
List of shipwrecks: 10 February 1953
Ship	State	Description
Susanna	Italy	The vessel was wrecked on a reef in the Red Sea 30 miles (48 km) north of Jeddah, Saudi Arabia.

=== 15 February ===
List of shipwrecks: 15 February 1953
Ship	State	Description
Shiratori Maru	Japan	The fishing vessel sank in a collision near Oshima, Honshu.
Stanley Force	United Kingdom	The coaster struck a submerged object and sank off Guernsey, Channel Islands.

=== 20 February ===
List of shipwrecks: 20 February 1953
Ship	State	Description
Ferryland	Canada	The cargo ship struck ground and sank at Tortuga Island.
Richard Crofts	United Kingdom	The sold off Castle-class trawler struck Roaring Jake reef near Cornaig Bay, Coll, Inner Hebrides in thick fog and heavy seas. She slipped off the reef and sank in 17-metre (56 ft) of water. Four crew reached shore, but her skipper and seven crew died.

=== 22 February ===
List of shipwrecks: 22 February 1953
Ship	State	Description
Azuma Maru	Japan	The 144-ton fishing vessel was lost in heavy weather.

=== 25 February ===
List of shipwrecks: 25 February 1953
Ship	State	Description
Medellin	Colombia	The cargo ship grounded in the Magdalena River, Colombia. Refloated and sold for scrapping.

=== 26 February ===
List of shipwrecks: 26 February 1953
Ship	State	Description
Huglen	United Kingdom	The cargo ship ran aground at Huglen, Norway.

=== 27 February ===
List of shipwrecks: 27 February 1953
Ship	State	Description
Mollie G	Canada	The tanker suffered explosions and burned out while loading at St. John's, Newfoundland and Labrador.
Siorak	Denmark	The 100-ton schooner struck as submerged rock off Avigait, Greenland (62°10′N 50°00′W) and sank.

=== Unknown date ===
List of shipwrecks: unknown February 1953
Ship	State	Description
Lark	Netherlands	The cargo ship was last sighted on 10 February off Brevik.

== March ==
=== 1 March ===
List of shipwrecks: 1 March 1953
Ship	State	Description
Baalbek	Norway	The cargo ship collided with the Great Nore Sands Fort, in the North Sea 5 nautical miles (9.3 km) off Sheerness, Kent, United Kingdom. One of the seven towers of the fort collapsed and the ship ran aground. Four of the fourteen crew of the fort were reported missing.

=== 2 March ===
List of shipwrecks: 2 March 1953
Ship	State	Description
Siorak	Denmark	The schooner struck a rock and sank off Avigait. All ten crew rescued.

=== 3 March ===
List of shipwrecks: 3 March 1953
Ship	State	Description
Loomis	United States	The 15-gross register ton, 45.8-foot (14.0 m) fishing vessel was destroyed by fire in Jamestown Bay (57°02′40″N 135°17′30″W) in Southeast Alaska 3 nautical miles (5.6 km; 3.5 mi) south of Sitka, Territory of Alaska.

=== 4 March ===
List of shipwrecks: 4 March 1953
Ship	State	Description
Northumbrian Coast	United Kingdom	The cargo ship collided with Egyptian Prince (United Kingdom) and was beached on the Mucking Flats in the Thames Estuary.
Rigel	Sweden	The cargo ship collided with Senegal (Italy) 25 nautical miles (46 km) north of Margate, Kent, United Kingdom (51°41′N 2°16′E) and sank. All 29 crew rescued by Arnhem (United Kingdom).

=== 8 March ===
List of shipwrecks: 8 March 1953
Ship	State	Description
Angy	Liberia	The tanker exploded in the Atlantic Ocean 1,125 miles (1,811 km) east of New York (40°22′N 50°11′W) in violent storms, breaking in two. The stern remained afloat at the time and it was believed that the bow did also but it was never found. Lost on the bow was her captain, his wife and six crewmen. Her stern was sighted by Claiborne (United States) the next day and 28 crew were rescued. Later the same day the stern was taken under tow by Seaborne (United States). The stern sank on 14 March several hundred miles east of New York.
City of Colchester	United Kingdom	The Liberty ship was damaged by fire at Dundee, Perthshire.
Sollum	Royal Egyptian Navy	The Bangor-class minesweeper sank 12 nautical miles (22 km) off Alexandria with the loss of 53 of her 115 crew. The 63 survivors were rescued by Czech (Poland).
Yorkdock	United States	The tugboat capsized and sank in the Delaware River.

=== 10 March ===
List of shipwrecks: 10 March 1953
Ship	State	Description
Southern Wind	United Kingdom	The yacht struck rocks and sank in the Mediterranean Sea off Antibes, Alpes-Maritimes, France. All three people aboard were rescued.
Tahsis No. 3	Canada	The bulk oil carrier sank after striking a rock in Welcome Pass north of Vancouver, British Columbia, Canada.

=== 11 March ===
List of shipwrecks: 11 March 1953
Ship	State	Description
Settsu Maru	Japan	The whaling support ship sank in the Antarctic after being caught in pack ice, or due to an accident with her sea valve, or sea injection valves.

=== 14 March ===
List of shipwrecks: 14 March 1953
Ship	State	Description
Occidente	Spain	The 120-ton vessel sprung a leak and sank at the entrance to the harbour at Luarca, Spain.

=== 15 March ===
List of shipwrecks: 15 March 1953
Ship	State	Description
Ibogawa Maru	Japan	The 896-ton cargo ship ran aground off Hirado Island.

=== 16 March ===
List of shipwrecks: 16 March 1953
Ship	State	Description
Ecuador	Ecuador	The 1,083-ton cargo vessel burned and sank in Limon Bay, Cristobal, Panama Canal Zone.
Safina-E-Millat	Unknown	The 8,134-ton cargo vessel was destroyed by fire while under repair at Karachi, and scrapped.

=== 17 March ===
List of shipwrecks: 17 March 1953
Ship	State	Description
Lairds Ben	United Kingdom	The cargo ship ran aground in the Clyde at Old Kilpatrick, Renfrewshire.

=== 18 March ===
List of shipwrecks: 18 March 1953
Ship	State	Description
Liege	Belgium	The cargo ship sank in a collision in the River Schelde in fog.

=== 19 March ===
List of shipwrecks: 19 March 1953
Ship	State	Description
Bandia	Sweden	The motor schooner burned and sank between the coast of Norway and Hallo.

=== 20 March ===
List of shipwrecks: 20 March 1953
Ship	State	Description
Cuma	Turkey	The cargo ship sank in a collision east of Great Yarmouth (52°40′N 2°14′E).
Milborne	United Kingdom	The coaster ran aground off Anglesey. Refloated but leaking, towed by Empire Punch (United Kingdom) to Holyhead. Later repaired and returned to service.
Roine	Finland	The cargo ship sank in a collision near the Newarp Lightship in fog.

=== 22 March ===
List of shipwrecks: 22 March 1953
Ship	State	Description
Leicester City	United Kingdom	The trawler was wrecked on rocks in heavy weather at Hoy, Orkney.

=== 24 March ===
List of shipwrecks: 24 March 1953
Ship	State	Description
Herada	Spain	The cargo ship was wrecked in fog on rocks at Percebellido, south of Cabo Torinana.
Hibou	Honduras	The passenger/cargo ship sprung a leak and foundered in the Pacific Ocean off Chile (22°59′S 70°50′W).

=== 27 March ===
List of shipwrecks: 27 March 1953
Ship	State	Description
River Lossie	United Kingdom	The trawler was wrecked on rocks in a snowstorm off Lerwick.

=== 28 March ===
List of shipwrecks: 28 March 1953
Ship	State	Description
HDMS Lougen	Royal Danish Navy	The minelayer was damaged by an onboard explosion at Rønne. Three crew were killed, seven were severely injured.

=== 29 March ===
List of shipwrecks: 29 March 1953
Ship	State	Description
Minhoto	Portugal	The motor schooner struck a submerged object and sank off Cabo Roca.
Mountcharles	United Kingdom	The cargo ship sank in the Bristol Channel (50°54′N 5°32′W). The crew were rescued by RFA Black Ranger (Royal Navy).

== April ==
=== 1 April ===
List of shipwrecks: 1 April 1953
Ship	State	Description
Ciudad de Palma	Spain	The passenger ship ran aground at Cala Figuera, Mallorca. All 670 passengers and crew rescued.

=== 2 April ===
List of shipwrecks: 2 April 1953
Ship	State	Description
North Cape	United States	The 77-foot (23 m) fishing vessel burned at anchor and sank near the Green Islands, about 25 miles (40 km) south of Jurien Bay, Australia, in 5 fathoms (30 ft; 9.1 m) of water.
Rolling Wave	United States	The 13-gross register ton, 36.2-foot (11.0 m) fishing vessel was destroyed by fire at the Thomas Basin Float (55°20′20″N 131°38′30″W) near Ketchikan, Territory of Alaska.

=== 4 April ===
List of shipwrecks: 4 April 1953
Ship	State	Description
TCG Dumlupınar	Turkish Navy	The Balao-class submarine collided with Naboland (Sweden) and sank in the Dardanelles with the loss of 81 of her 86 crew.

=== 5 April ===
List of shipwrecks: 5 April 1953
Ship	State	Description
Elsie Thorden	Sweden	The 1,933-ton cargo ship went aground at Barranquilla, Colombia, broke in two the next day.

=== 6 April ===
List of shipwrecks: 6 April 1953
Ship	State	Description
Susan Vittery	Ireland	The schooner foundered in Dungarvan Bay. All crew survived.

=== 7 April ===
List of shipwrecks: 7 April 1953
Ship	State	Description
Sollum	Royal Egyptian Navy	The Matrouth-class minesweeper foundered in heavy weather off Alexandria, Egypt.
Zulu Coast	United Kingdom	The cargo ship was wrecked 2 miles (3.2 km) north of the Groene River in fog.

=== 10 April ===
List of shipwrecks: 10 April 1953
Ship	State	Description
Angela	Finland	The coaster ran aground in heavy weather on Coll, Inner Hebrides, United Kingdom. All 12 crew survived.

=== 13 April ===
List of shipwrecks: 13 April 1953
Ship	State	Description
Lien Sheng	China	The 125-ton vessel burned and sank in the Formosa Strait.
Taboga	Panama	The cargo ship foundered 4 nautical miles (7.4 km) west south west of Saint Mathieu Point, Ouessant, France.

=== 14 April ===
List of shipwrecks: 14 April 1953
Ship	State	Description
Banja	Norway	The vessel was driven onto the mole at Vadsø, Norway after a line fouled her prop.
HMS Conway	United Kingdom	Conway after grounding The Mercantile Marine Service Association training ship, formerly a 90-gun Rodney-class ship of the line, ran aground in the Menai Strait and was subsequently declared a total loss. Her wreck was destroyed by a fire in 1956.

=== 16 April ===
List of shipwrecks: 16 April 1953
Ship	State	Description
Menestheus	United Kingdom	The cargo ship suffered an explosion in her engine room and caught fire in the Pacific Ocean. Her 40 crew were rescued by the Victory ship Navajo Victory (United States, which took Menestheus in tow for San Diego, California, United States.

=== 17 April ===
List of shipwrecks: 17 April 1953
Ship	State	Description
La Marmolera	Dominican Republic	The 168-ton vessel sank after a collision a wharf in Puerto Plata, Dominican Republic.

=== 18 April ===
List of shipwrecks: 18 April 1953
Ship	State	Description
Kronprins Frederick	Denmark	The ferry caught fire at Harwich, Essex, United Kingdom and was burnt out and sank. Refloated and towed to Elsinore, Denmark in September 1953 for repair.

=== 19 April ===
List of shipwrecks: 19 April 1953
Ship	State	Description
Abumando	Chile	The 239-ton vessel was driven ashore and wrecked in a storm at Valparaiso, Chile.

=== 20 April ===
List of shipwrecks: 20 April 1953
Ship	State	Description
Noel Du Nord	Canada	The 138-ton cargo vessel sank after a collision in Lac Saint-Pierre, about 63 miles (101 km) below Montreal.

=== 21 April ===
List of shipwrecks: 21 April 1953
Ship	State	Description
Victoria	France	The trawler was wrecked on rocks at St. Paul Island, Cape Breton in heavy weather.

=== 24 April ===
List of shipwrecks: 24 April 1953
Ship	State	Description
Narkissos	Greece	The 131-ton cargo vessel burned and sank off Kynaros Island.

=== 27 April ===
List of shipwrecks: 27 April 1953
Ship	State	Description
Sempach	Switzerland	The cargo ship capsized and sank in the Mediterranean Sea 3 to 4 nautical miles (5.6 to 7.4 km) north of Nemours, French Algeria in long swells. Her 12 crew and 1 female passenger survived.

=== 28 April ===
List of shipwrecks: 28 April 1953
Ship	State	Description
Alert III	United States	The 65-foot (20 m) tug sank in 50 feet (15 m) of water off the coast of Massachusetts in Buzzards Bay at (41°29′45″N 070°52′30″W), halfway between Pasque Island and the Smith Point radome.

== May ==
=== 1 May ===
List of shipwrecks: 1 May 1953
Ship	State	Description
Amacitia	Canada	The cargo ship was wrecked on a reef at Long Point, near Port au Port, Newfoundland in fog.
El Shark	Egypt	The vessel was wrecked on a reef 60 miles (97 km) from Suez.

=== 5 May ===
List of shipwrecks: 5 May 1953
Ship	State	Description
Cabo Quintres	Spain	The cargo ship was wrecked on rocks off Cabo Villano in fog.

=== 6 May ===
List of shipwrecks: 6 May 1953
Ship	State	Description
Duke of York	United Kingdom	The ferry collided with USNS Haiti Victory (United States Navy) 40 nautical miles (74 km) east of Harwich, Essex and was cut in two. The bow section sank, three lives were lost of the 396 people on board. The stern section was towed to Harwich. A new bow was built and Duke of York returned to service.
General Drury	Canada	The motor vessel sprang a leak and sank 50 miles (80 km) northeast of Grand Turk.

=== 8 May ===
List of shipwrecks: May 1953
Ship	State	Description
St. Bernadette	United States	The 171-ton fishing vessel sprang a leak in her engine room and sank 8 miles (13 km) southwest of Mount Desert, Maine.

=== 9 May ===
List of shipwrecks: 9 May 1953
Ship	State	Description
Sonja	United States	The 408-ton tuna fishing vessel sank in the Pacific Ocean after a collision off Cabo Blanco, Costa Rica.
Supreme	United States	The 33.5-foot (10.2 m), 7-gross register ton, fishing vessel sank at the Thomas Basin Float at Ketchikan in Southeast Alaska.

=== 11 May ===
List of shipwrecks: 11 May 1953
Ship	State	Description
Chacartegui Segundo	Spain	The cargo ship was wrecked at La Vaca, off Cape Penas in fog.
Henry Steinbrenner	United States	The 427-foot (130 m), 4,719-gross register ton bulk carrier sank in Lake Superior 15 nautical miles (28 km) south of Isle Royale Light with the loss of 17 of her 31 crew after her cargo hatch covers were lost during a storm.

=== 12 May ===
List of shipwrecks: 12 May 1953
Ship	State	Description
Georgiana	Panama	The cargo ship was wrecked on rocks outside the harbour of San Juan. Later refloated and sold for scrap.

=== 14 May ===
List of shipwrecks: 14 May 1953
Ship	State	Description
Docteur Yersin	France	The Park ship was lost 3 miles (4.8 km) from Đồng Hới, French Indochina.
Erandio	Spain	The 112-ton trawler was wrecked at Quiberon in heavy weather.

=== 15 May ===
List of shipwrecks: 15 May 1953
Ship	State	Description
Camilles	Australia	The Castle-class trawler, purchased by the Royal Australian Navy for use as a target, was scuttled in the Rottnest ship graveyard.

=== 16 May ===
List of shipwrecks: 16 May 1953
Ship	State	Description
Rio Lagares	Spain	The 130-ton trawler was wrecked at Punta Candelária, near Cedeira, in fog.

=== 17 May ===
List of shipwrecks: 17 May 1953
Ship	State	Description
F.P.B. 1023	Royal Navy	The fast patrol boat caught fire and sank at Aarhus, Denmark. HMS Gay Archer (Royal Navy) was damaged by the fire.
Nasr	Royal Egyptian Navy	The Bangor-class minesweeper collided with the steamship Jaguar (Sweden) in Suez Bay and sank with the loss of her captain. The rest of her 111 crew were rescued.
Swan	United States	The 23-gross register ton, 44.6-foot (13.6 m) fishing vessel was destroyed by fire off Takanis Bay (57°55′N 136°31′W) on the southeast end of Yakobi Island in the Alexander Archipelago in Southeast Alaska.

=== 18 May ===
List of shipwrecks: 18 May 1953
Ship	State	Description
Hero	United Kingdom	The 120-foot (37 m), 226-ton trawler was sunk in a collision with Rivercrest (United Kingdom) in dense fog 30 miles (48 km) west of the Smalls Lighthouse in the Irish sea. All eleven crew rescued by Rivercrest, but one man refused to leave the sinking ship and remained on her as she went down. He was later picked up almost unconscious and died.

=== 20 May ===
List of shipwrecks: 20 May 1953
Ship	State	Description
Jerry	United States	The 16-gross register ton, 52-foot (15.8 m) fishing vessel was destroyed by fire in the harbor at Cordova, Territory of Alaska.
Lady Wolmar	United Kingdom	The concrete ship was driven ashore on Cheju Island, South Korea (33°32′N 126°50′E). She was on a voyage from Kobe to Inchon. She broke up, a total loss. All crew rescued by USS Henrico (United States Navy) and a Royal Navy ship.
Ronald and Mary Jane	United States	The fishing vessel burned and sank 35 miles (56 km) south southwest of Shelburne, Nova Scotia.

=== 21 May ===
List of shipwrecks: 21 May 1953
Ship	State	Description
El Retiro	Vanuatu	The 249-ton cargo vessel was wrecked at the entrance to the Segond Channel, Espiritu Santo.

=== 23 May ===
List of shipwrecks: 23 May 1953
Ship	State	Description
George R	United States	The tugboat sank in the Gulf of Mexico at 28°59′N 91°28′W.

=== 24 May ===
List of shipwrecks: 24 May 1953
Ship	State	Description
Andaman	Sweden	The cargo ship collided in fog with Fortune (Panama) in the English Channel and sank in the South Goodwins. All crew rescued and landed at Dover, Kent.
Lucy Edwina	Canada	The motor schooner broke lose from her moorings and was wrecked at Raleigh, Newfoundland and Labrador.
Ternefjell	Norway	The cargo ship collided with Dotterell (United Kingdom) off Start Point, Devon and sank. All 26 crew were rescued by Dotterell.

=== 25 May ===
List of shipwrecks: 25 May 1953
Ship	State	Description
Landan	Norway	The cargo ship capsized and sank off Svaaholmen Norway, south of Egersund.

=== 26 May ===
List of shipwrecks: 26 May 1953
Ship	State	Description
Maggie	United States	The 12-gross register ton, 30.3-foot (9.2 m) fishing vessel was destroyed by fire near Anchor Point in Cook Inlet on the south-central coast of the Territory of Alaska.

=== 27 May ===
List of shipwrecks: 27 May 1953
Ship	State	Description
Mataquito	Chile	The 326-ton tugboat sank in heavy weather in Valparaiso Bay.

=== 29 May ===
List of shipwrecks: 29 May 1953
Ship	State	Description
Saxonstar	Liberia	The tanker was wrecked on rocks off Ishigaki Island 160 miles (260 km) northeast of Formosa in heavy weather.

=== 30 May ===
List of shipwrecks: 30 May 1953
Ship	State	Description
Mona Lisa	United States	The fishing vessel burned and sank off South America.

=== Unknown date ===
List of shipwrecks: Unknown May 1953
Ship	State	Description
Lucimar	Brazil	The vessel sank off Tamboretes Lighthouse, Santa Catarina before 8 May.

== June ==
=== 3 June ===
List of shipwrecks: 3 June 1953
Ship	State	Description
Lesummunde	West Germany	The vessel sprung a leak 60 miles (97 km) off Ago, near Hudiksvall Sweden, and was taken under tow but sank at 61°33′N 19°18′E.

=== 4 June ===
List of shipwrecks: 4 June 1953
Ship	State	Description
Serapide	Italy	The cargo ship sank off Cape Palos, Spain. All 24 crew rescued by Legazpi (Spanish Navy).

=== 7 June ===
List of shipwrecks: 7 June 1953
Ship	State	Description
Bagotville Transport	Canada	The motor schooner burned in the Saguenay River.
Pan Massachusetts, and Phoenix	United States	The T3 tanker Phoenix collided in the Delaware River with the tanker Pan Massachusetts (United States) at Delaware City, Delaware. Both ships caught fire and were abandoned by their crews. Phoenix ran aground and broke in tow. She was declared a constructive total loss and consequently scrapped. Pan Massachusetts was on a voyage from Texas City, Texas to Philadelphia, Pennsylvania. The fire was extinguished on 9 June, and she was beached on 14 June. She was refloated on 21 June and taken in to Baltimore, Maryland. She was repaired in 1954 and returned to service as Commonwealth.

=== 8 June ===
List of shipwrecks: 8 June 1953
Ship	State	Description
Helen B.	United States	The 71-foot (22 m), 105-ton fishing vessel burned in Peril Strait half way between Saook Bay and Rodman Bay (57°29′N 135°19′W).

=== 10 June ===
List of shipwrecks: 10 June 1953
Ship	State	Description
Riviere	United Kingdom	The 117-foot (36 m), 226-ton trawler was sunk in a collision with Firelight (United Kingdom) in dense fog 7 miles (11 km) northeast of Flamborough Head. There were three survivors. Her captain and nine crew were killed.

=== 14 June ===
List of shipwrecks: 14 June 1953
Ship	State	Description
Bedford Prince	United Kingdom	The Fort ship struck a rock and was beached to prevent sinking in the Gulf of Paria. Later refloated, towed to New Orleans and sold for scrap.

=== 16 June ===
List of shipwrecks: 16 June 1953
Ship	State	Description
Brand V	Norway	The cruise ship ran aground at Ålesund and was a total loss. All passengers and crew were rescued.
Harriet and Vivian	Canada	The vessel was lost at Indian Tickle, Labrador.

=== 17 June ===
List of shipwrecks: 17 June 1953
Ship	State	Description
Empire State	Honduras	The cargo ship was wrecked on rocks 3 miles (4.8 km) from Walton, Nova Scotia, due to steering gear failure. Later refloated and sold for scrap.

=== 20 June ===
List of shipwrecks: 20 June 1953
Ship	State	Description
Rosnes	Norway	The cargo ship was wrecked at Lagoyfallet, Sollund.
Scotiadoc	Canada	The 424-foot (129 m), 4,432-gross register ton bulk carrier sank with the loss of one life in 850 feet (259 m) of water in Lake Superior off Trowbridge Island, near the Sleeping Giant on the Sibley Peninsula in Ontario, Canada, after colliding in heavy fog with the steamer Burlington (Canada). There were 30 survivors.

=== 26 June ===
List of shipwrecks: 26 June 1953
Ship	State	Description
Cornelis B	Netherlands	The 366-ton coastal tanker sank after a collision in dense fog with the tanker Achille Lauro (Italy) about 19 miles (31 km) northwest of Ile de Batz (48°57′N 04°23′W).
Mary Pat	United States	The 10-gross register ton, 27.7-foot (8.4 m) motor vessel was destroyed by fire in Bristol Bay off the coast of the Territory of Alaska.

=== 27 June ===
List of shipwrecks: 27 June 1953
Ship	State	Description
Oga Maru	Japan	The 884-ton cargo ship was wrecked in fog near Tsunoshima Lighthouse, Shimonoseki.

=== Unknown date ===
List of shipwrecks: unknown June 1953
Ship	State	Description
Azuma Maru No.8	Japan	The 143-ton fishing vessel sank in heavy weather sometime in June.

== 28 June ==
List of shipwrecks: 28 June 1953
Ship	State	Description
Steenstraete	Belgium	The Victory ship caught fire at Beira, Portuguese East Africa with the loss of 20 stevedores. The cargo ships Clan Sutherland, Clan Macaulay, Caledonian Monarch and Umtali (all United Kingdom) were damaged.

== July ==
=== 2 July ===
List of shipwrecks: 2 July 1953
Ship	State	Description
Sangola	United Kingdom	The passenger ship ran aground in the Hooghly River at Budge Budge, India.

=== 6 July ===
List of shipwrecks: 6 July 1953
Ship	State	Description
Chip Lin	China	The cargo ship was wrecked on rocks in a storm off Cheduba, Burma (18°47′N 93°30′E).
H. A. Gehres	Philippines	The 103-ton fishing vessel sprung a leak and sank in an unknown location while under tow from New Orleans to the Philippines.

=== 7 July ===
List of shipwrecks: 7 July 1953
Ship	State	Description
Cornhusker Mariner	United States	Super Typhoon Kit:The cargo ship dragged anchor and went aground at Pusan, Korea in a typhoon and broke in two. The stern section was salvaged by USS Current (United States Navy).

=== 10 July ===
List of shipwrecks: 10 July 1953
Ship	State	Description
Alfie Cam	Australia	The 282-ton fishing vessel was wrecked at Eden, New South Wales.
William Clarke Quinn	United States	The 108-ton fishing vessel sank 5 miles (8.0 km) west of the Sabine River mouth due to bow damage.

=== 13 July ===
List of shipwrecks: 13 July 1953
Ship	State	Description
Fimbert	Dominican Republic	The 675-ton motor-schooner sank after an explosion off Cape Samana, Dominican republic.

=== 14 July ===
List of shipwrecks: 14 July 1953
Ship	State	Description
Greenrock	Canada	The 181-ton motor-schooner fishing vessel sank in a collision with Thomas D. in fog 10 miles (16 km) off Nova Scotia.
Jacob Luckenbach	United States	The cargo ship collided with Hawaiian Pilot (United States) and sank 18 nautical miles (33 km) southwest of San Francisco, California.

=== 16 July ===
List of shipwrecks: 16 July 1953
Ship	State	Description
Three unidentified landing ships	Republic of China Navy	Chinese Civil War: Second Battle of Dongshan Island: The landing ships were sunk in a harbor on the coast of Dongshan Island in China by mortar fire that detonated their cargoes of ammunition.

=== 18 July ===
List of shipwrecks: 18 July 1953
Ship	State	Description
Aina Maria Nurminen	Finland	The 370.1-foot (112.8 m) 4,021-ton cargo ship struck a naval mine in Kiel Fjord (54°34′N 10°34′E) and was beached, refloated and broken up at Boom in December 1953.

=== 20 July ===
List of shipwrecks: 20 July 1953
Ship	State	Description
A R 5	United States	The 8-gross register ton, 27.5-foot (8.4 m) fishing vessel was destroyed by fire near Red Bluff (58°04′N 157°29′W) on the Bristol Bay coast of the Territory of Alaska.

=== 22 July ===
List of shipwrecks: 22 July 1953
Ship	State	Description
Pagan	India	The 721-ton paddle steamer passenger/cargo vessel was sunk in a collision in the River Brahmaputra.

=== 23 July ===
List of shipwrecks: 23 July 1953
Ship	State	Description
Pan Georgia	United States	The T2 tanker exploded and was burnt out at Wilmington, Delaware. Consequently laid up, subsequently converted to a dredger.

=== 24 July ===
List of shipwrecks: 24 July 1953
Ship	State	Description
Francis Lorraine	United States	The 148-ton cargo ship burned and sank near Port Hardy, British Columbia, Canada.
General Alvear	Argentina	The 1,717-ton paddle steamer cargo vessel stranded and sank in fog at the entrance to Buenos Aires.

=== 26 July ===
List of shipwrecks: 26 July 1953
Ship	State	Description
Duero	Spain	The vessel collided with Culrain (United Kingdom) and sank in the Strait of Gibraltar (35°37′N 5°25′W). All 28 crew were saved.

=== 31 July ===
List of shipwrecks: 31 July 1953
Ship	State	Description
Bessemer	Canada	The 158-ton fishing vessel burned and sank off Halifax, Nova Scotia.

== August ==
=== 1 August ===
List of shipwrecks: 1 August 1953
Ship	State	Description
Mishimasan Maru	Japan	The cargo ship stranded and sank near Kinkasan Lighthouse, Iwate prefecture, Honshu, Japan.

=== 4 August ===
List of shipwrecks: 4 August 1953
Ship	State	Description
St. Paul	Liberia	The cargo ship stranded 5 miles (8.0 km) southeast of Cape Mesurado, Liberia. Later refloated but sank under tow.

=== 8 August ===
List of shipwrecks: 8 August 1953
Ship	State	Description
Hampton Roads	Honduras	The 197-ton cargo ship sank in the Atlantic Ocean southeast of Wilmington, North Carolina (33°12′N 75°34′W).

=== 9 August ===
List of shipwrecks: 9 August 1953
Ship	State	Description
St Columba	United Kingdom	The ferry ran aground in Ettrick Bay, Kyles of Bute, Buteshire. Refloated the same day.

=== 10 August ===
List of shipwrecks: 10 August 1953
Ship	State	Description
Ice Hunter	Canada	The 122.7-foot (37.4 m) 257-ton cargo ship was wrecked on Bowell Island, 5 miles south of Chesterfield Inlet, Hudson Bay, Canada.

=== 11 August ===
List of shipwrecks: 11 August 1953
Ship	State	Description
Louzado	Portugal	The 224-ton fishing vessel sprung a leak and sank near Virgin Rocks, Newfoundland and Labrador.
Sacco No. 3	United States	The 28-gross register ton, 55.2-foot (16.8 m) scow was wrecked 2.5 nautical miles (4.6 km) southeast of Ocean Cape (59°32′30″N 39°51′30″W), Territory of Alaska.

=== 12 August ===
List of shipwrecks: 12 August 1953
Ship	State	Description
Doromar	Honduras	The 152-ton cargo ship caught fire in the engine room and sank in the Caribbean Sea east south east of Playa del Carmen (20°05′N 84°38′W).

=== 15 August ===
List of shipwrecks: 15 August 1953
Ship	State	Description
Metamora	Canada	Hurricane Barbara: The 103.7-foot (31.6 m) 117-ton cargo ship, a motor schooner, was wrecked in a hurricane at Point Riche, Newfoundland, Canada.

=== 19 August ===
List of shipwrecks: 19 August 1953
Ship	State	Description
Else Basse	Denmark	Else Basse on fire The cargo ship caught fire off Cape Anguille, Newfoundland and Labrador, Canada and was abandoned. Her 24 crew and a passenger were rescued by Corner Brook (United Kingdom. She was subsequently repaired and returned to service as the Finnish Kaarina.

=== 22 August ===
List of shipwrecks: 22 August 1953
Ship	State	Description
Vertrauen	West Germany	The 286-ton cargo ship sank 20 miles (32 km) southwest of Ronne in heavy weather.

=== 28 August ===
List of shipwrecks: 28 August 1953
Ship	State	Description
George R. Bradford	Canada	The 167-ton cargo vessel was wrecked at Amherst, Magdalen Islands, in the Gulf of St. Lawrence, Canada in fog.

=== 31 August ===
List of shipwrecks: 31 August 1953
Ship	State	Description
Akademik Karpinsky	Soviet Union	The cargo ship foundered on a voyage between Kaliningrad and Amsterdam.

=== Unknown date ===
List of shipwrecks: Unknown August 1953
Ship	State	Description
Erland	Denmark	The 95.5-foot (29.1 m) 135-ton motor schooner cargo vessel was lost off Ventspils, Latvia, USSR.
Sendra	Spain	The 106-ton fishing vessel was stranded in dense fog north of Oued Massa, Morocco.

== September ==
=== 1 September ===
List of shipwrecks: 1 September 1953
Ship	State	Description
Rodolfo Skalweit	Argentina	The cargo ship was wrecked in a storm at San Antonio, Argentina and broke up.

=== 3 September ===
List of shipwrecks: 3 September 1953
Ship	State	Description
Laifjeld	Norway	The 121-ton fishing vessel sprung a leak and sank 120 miles (190 km) northeast of the Faroe Islands.
Raeburn	United Kingdom	The cargo ship ran aground at the Monkstone Rock Lighthouse in the Bristol Channel.

=== 5 September ===
List of shipwrecks: 5 September 1953
Ship	State	Description
Chaco	Argentina	The 5,103-ton cargo ship stranded in the main channel at Necochea, Argentina. Later beached and declared a total loss.

=== 7 September ===
List of shipwrecks: 7 September 1953
Ship	State	Description
Ann-Charlotte	Spain	The 260-ton motor-schooner cargo ship sank in a collision 70 miles (110 km) northwest of Borkum.
Eugenia	Panama	Hurricane Carol: The cargo ship was driven ashore at Provincetown, Massachusetts. Crew taken off by breeches buoy.
Lomela	United States	The 42-gross register ton, 51.6-foot (15.7 m) fishing vessel was destroyed by fire in the Gulf of Alaska approximately 19 nautical miles (35 km; 22 mi) southeast of Kodiak, Territory of Alaska.

=== 8 September ===
List of shipwrecks: 8 September 1953
Ship	State	Description
Liberté	France	The ocean liner ran aground at Le Havre. Refloated that day.

=== 9 September ===
List of shipwrecks: 9 September 1953
Ship	State	Description
Esmereldas	Ecuadorian Navy	The naval yacht ran aground in the Gunyas River and was declared a total loss.

=== 15 September ===
List of shipwrecks: 15 September 1953
Ship	State	Description
South Pacific	United States	The 240-ton fishing vessel burned and sank in an unknown location.

=== 16 September ===
List of shipwrecks: 16 September 1953
Ship	State	Description
Gustaf	Sweden	The 115-ton motor-schooner cargo ship burned and sank 6 miles off Stocka after an explosion in the cargo hold.

=== 18 September ===
List of shipwrecks: 18 September 1953
Ship	State	Description
Hassett	United Kingdom	The 349-ton trawler was wrecked at Auckengill, due to misinterpretation of lights by her skipper. Five crew were killed, with 14 survivors.

=== 19 September ===
List of shipwrecks: 19 September 1953
Ship	State	Description
Francis Lorraine	Canada	The 148-ton fishing vessel burned out at St. John's, Newfoundland and Labrador.
Norsya	Canada	The 126-ton motor ship struck a submerged object and sank 12 miles (19 km) west of Matane.

=== 20 September ===
List of shipwrecks: 20 September 1953
Ship	State	Description
George Scott	United Kingdom	The 209-ton trawler, a sold off naval trawler, was wrecked at Muckle Flugga, Shetland Islands. Later refloated, towed to Aberdeen and scrapped.

=== 21 September ===
List of shipwrecks: 21 September 1953
Ship	State	Description
Greenville	Liberia	The cargo ship sank in the Atlantic Ocean (50°00′N 23°30′W) with the loss of one crewmember. The 25 survivors were rescued by Île de France (France).
Libby, McNeill & Libby X No. 2	United States	The 34-gross register ton, 56-foot (17.1 m) scow sank at Yakutat, Territory of Alaska.

=== 22 September ===
List of shipwrecks: 22 September 1953
Ship	State	Description
Rosina	Spain	The 158-ton fishing vessel sprung a leak and sank 15 miles (24 km) off Hercules Lighthouse.

=== 23 September ===
List of shipwrecks: 23 September 1953
Ship	State	Description
RFA Wave Ruler	Royal Navy	The Wave-class oiler ran aground off Swansea, Wales. Refloated on 5 October and returned to service.
Wolf III	United States	The vessel burned and sank at the Wolf and Co., Russell Inc dock in the Harvey Canal 4½ miles south of Harvey Locks, Harvey, Louisiana.
Wolf IV and Wolf V	United States	The former YMS-1-class minesweepers burned and sank at the Wolf and Co., Russell Inc dock in the Harvey Canal 4 1/2 miles (7.2 km) south of Harvey Locks, Harvey, Louisiana.

=== 25 September ===
List of shipwrecks: 25 September 1953
Ship	State	Description
Dover	Sweden	The 143-ton cargo ship sprung a leak after engine failure and sank 20 miles (32 km) east of the Outer Skerries.

=== 27 September ===
List of shipwrecks: 27 September 1953
Ship	State	Description
Donatello D.	Italy	The cargo ship was wrecked in a storm on rocks off Riou Island, near Marseille, France, sinking the next day. The crew were rescued by Calypso (France) from Riou Island and Grand Conglü island.
Gilbert Jr.	Dominican Republic	The 271-ton cargo vessel sank at Puerto Estrella, Puerto Rico.
Pasadena II	Canada	The 115.5-foot (35.2 m) 141-ton motor-schooner fishing vessel was wrecked in fog off Bull Rock, near Fisherman Harbour, Nova Scotia, Canada.
Walrus	United States	The 21-gross register ton, 41-foot (12 m) fishing vessel was destroyed by fire at Lincoln Rock in Clarence Strait in the Territory of Alaska.

=== 28 September ===
List of shipwrecks: 28 September 1953
Ship	State	Description
Hans Falnes	Norway	The 110.9-foot (33.8 m) 217-ton cargo ship, a sold off naval whaler/minesweeper, was stranded in dense fog off Gamle Hellesund, Trøndenøholmen and sank. Raised, repaired and returned to service.

=== 29 September ===
List of shipwrecks: 29 September 1953
Ship	State	Description
HMS Tyrian	Royal Navy	The S and T-class destroyer ran aground in the North Sea 17 nautical miles (31 km) east south east of Cromer, Norfolk, England. Later refloated.

=== 30 September ===
List of shipwrecks: 30 September 1953
Ship	State	Description
USS Rockford	United States Navy	The decommissioned Tacoma-class frigate was sunk as a torpedo target.
Sortland	United States	The 7-gross register ton, 28.5-foot (8.7 m) fishing vessel was destroyed by fire at Driftwood Bay (59°56′N 149°13′W) in Day Harbor on the coast of the Kenai Peninsula in the Territory of Alaska.

=== Unknown date ===
List of shipwrecks: Unknown date September 1953
Ship	State	Description
C. A. Anderson	Canada	The 146-ton vessel was wrecked at L'Anse-au-Clair, Labrador.
Celt	United States	The 43-gross register ton, 62.5-foot (19.1 m) fishing vessel was destroyed by fire in Cholmondeley Sound (55°17′N 132°04′W) in Southeast Alaska.

== October ==
=== 2 October ===
List of shipwrecks: 2 October 1953
Ship	State	Description
Bussard	Denmark	The 231-ton cargo ship was lost on rocks near Stavern, Norway.
Tong Shui	Panama	The T1 tanker ran aground on a reef off Pratas Island, Taiwan. She was on a voyage from Hong Kong to Negros Island, Philippines. She was refloated on 9 October and laid up, hulked at Manila 1956.

=== 5 October ===
List of shipwrecks: 5 October 1953
Ship	State	Description
Kotka	Finland	The 943-ton cargo vessel capsized due to cargo shift in heavy seas and sank 10 miles (16 km) south of Hoburg.

=== 7 October ===
List of shipwrecks: 7 October 1953
Ship	State	Description
Aladag	Turkey	The 195-ton cargo ship was lost in heavy weather at Incer Burnu Dardanelles Strait, 20 miles (32 km) from Gelibolu.
Beckenham	United Kingdom	The cargo ship ran aground and broke in two at Cape Ratmanova in the Kara Sea, Soviet Union. All 35 crew were rescued by the Liberty ship Alexander Suvorov (Soviet Union).
Bima	Norway	The 164-ton cargo ship stranded on Langholmen, near Skudeneshavn.
Fearless	United States	The 63-gross register ton, 64.9-foot (19.8 m) scow sank in Iliamna Bay on the southeast coast of the Territory of Alaska's Alaska Peninsula.

=== 9 October ===
List of shipwrecks: 9 October 1953
Ship	State	Description
Jr.	United States	The 9-gross register ton motor vessel was destroyed by fire at 55°14′36″N 131°26′30″W, near Bold Island (55.2492°N 131.4169°W) in Southeast Alaska.

=== 13 October ===
List of shipwrecks: 13 October 1953
Ship	State	Description
Tiderip	United States	The 15-gross register ton, 39.6-foot (12.1 m) fishing vessel sank in the Gulf of Alaska near Kodiak, Territory of Alaska.

=== 14 October ===
List of shipwrecks: 14 October 1953
Ship	State	Description
Chrysanthi	Greece	The 655-ton cargo ship sprung a leak and sank off Corfu.
Reliance No. 3	United States	The 10-gross register ton, 31.9-foot (9.7 m) fishing vessel was destroyed by fire in Lynn Canal off Naked Island (58°15′20″N 134°56′30″W) near Funter Bay in the Alexander Archipelago in Southeast Alaska.

=== 16 October ===
List of shipwrecks: 16 October 1953
Ship	State	Description
Mary F. Hyde	Canada	The 114-ton motor schooner was lost in the Cabot Strait, between Port aux Basques, and Sydney, Nova Scotia.
Santa Magdalena	Brazil	The 2,201-ton vessel burned and sank 15 miles (24 km) off Maranhao.

=== 20 October ===
List of shipwrecks: 20 October 1953
Ship	State	Description
Lamy-Unidos	Brazil	The 196.2-foot (59.8 m), 747-ton cargo vessel was wrecked at Florianopolis, Santa Catarina, Brazil.

=== 21 October ===
List of shipwrecks: 21 October 1953
Ship	State	Description
Bharatveer	India	The cargo ship was driven ashore 5 nautical miles (9.3 km) north of Madras in a cyclone. A fire broke out two days later and she was subsequently declared a constructive total loss.
Hoop op Zegen	Belgium	The 96.8-foot (29.5 m), 132-ton fishing vessel sank after a collision with Varios Hellas (Greece) in the North Sea 35 miles (56 km) from Oostende.

=== 22 October ===
List of shipwrecks: 22 October 1953
Ship	State	Description
Eiho Maru	Japan	The tanker ran aground in the River Mersey, United Kingdom, three times within 24 hours.
Lokki	Finland	The 114.5-foot (34.9 m), 206-ton cargo ship was wrecked in fog at Blagrundet, between Nordmaling and Umea, Sweden.

=== 24 October ===
List of shipwrecks: 24 October 1953
Ship	State	Description
Lucero del Alba	Mexico	The 170-ton vessel was lost off Punta Molas, Quintana roo.

=== 25 October ===
List of shipwrecks: 25 October 1953
Ship	State	Description
Sea Gram	United States	The 13-gross register ton, 41.8-foot (12.7 m) fishing vessel was destroyed by fire at Saltery Bay (57°47′N 134°57′W) in Tenakee Inlet in Southeast Alaska.

=== 26 October ===
List of shipwrecks: 26 October 1953
Ship	State	Description
Islandmagee	United Kingdom	The 117-foot (36 m), 227-ton cargo vessel sank in a Force 9 gale just after passing the North Carr Lightship. Lost with all six hands. Wreck located in a survey in 1960 (56°17′N 02°32′W).

=== 27 October ===
List of shipwrecks: 27 October 1953
Ship	State	Description
Jane W	United States	The 100-ton vessel burned and sank 30 miles north of Cayenne.
Poseidon	Sweden	The 227-ton cargo ship stranded and sank at Landsort.
Robert Lindsay	United Kingdom Royal National Lifeboat Institution	The lifeboat capsized and was driven ashore attempting to enter the harbor at Arbroath in a gale after attempting to locate/help the cargo ship Islandmagee that sank in the Force 9 gale. Six crewmen died, one survived. Repaired and returned to service.

=== 28 October ===
List of shipwrecks: 28 October 1953
Ship	State	Description
Dola	Canada	The 157-ton tugboat was sunk in a collision in fog off the entrance to Howe Sound, Vancouver, Canada.

=== Unknown date ===
List of shipwrecks: Unknown date October 1953
Ship	State	Description
Hiawatha	United States	The 74-gross register ton, 66-foot (20.1 m) yacht sank at the entrance to Port Etches on the south-central coast of the Territory of Alaska.

== November ==
=== 1 November ===
List of shipwrecks: 1 November 1953
Ship	State	Description
Juno	Norway	The 113-ton cargo ship stranded on Hustadviken, south of Kristiansund.

=== 2 November ===
List of shipwrecks: 2 November 1953
Ship	State	Description
Trygve	United States	The 15-gross register ton, 38.5-foot (11.7 m) fishing vessel was wrecked on the beach at Homer Spit on the southern tip of the Kenai Peninsula in the Territory of Alaska.

=== 3 November ===
List of shipwrecks: 3 November 1953
Ship	State	Description
Oliver Olsen	United States	The 2,235-ton cargo vessel ran ashore at Brandon, Oregon. Condemned and scrapped, or became part of the south jetty.

=== 4 November ===
List of shipwrecks: 4 November 1953
Ship	State	Description
Andrew Z	United States	The 12-gross register ton, 36.5-foot (11.1 m) fishing vessel was destroyed by fire in George Inlet on the south coast of Revillagigedo Island in the Alexander Archipelago in Southeast Alaska.
Tonghai	Sweden	The cargo ship collided with Esso Cardiff (United Kingdom) in fog off the coast of Spain (44°26′N 08°35′W). Tonghai was taken in tow by the tug Abeille 26 (France) but sank on 6 November at Farrol Roads. All crew were rescued by Esso Cardiff.

=== 6 November ===
List of shipwrecks: 6 November 1953
Ship	State	Description
Björkö	Sweden	The cargo ship collided with USAS Seawind (United States Army) and sank off Cuxhaven, West Germany. Seven of her eighteen crew were killed.

=== 7 November ===
List of shipwrecks: 7 November 1953
Ship	State	Description
Columbus	Netherlands	The 499-ton cargo vessel was lost 140 miles (230 km) east of Grimsby due to cargo shift.
Meteor	United States	The 8-gross register ton, 28.4-foot (8.7 m) fishing vessel was destroyed by fire off Rocky Point (60°21′30″N 147°03′00″W) on Montague Island in Prince William Sound on the south-central coast of the Territory of Alaska.

=== 8 November ===
List of shipwrecks: 8 November 1953
Ship	State	Description
Columbus	Netherlands	The coaster sank 50 nautical miles (93 km) north west of Texel. All eleven crew were rescued.

=== 9 November ===
List of shipwrecks: 9 November 1953
Ship	State	Description
Wanita	United States	The 32-gross register ton, 44-foot (13 m) fishing vessel was destroyed by fire at the mouth of Red Bay on the north end of Prince of Wales Island in the Alexander Archipelago in Southeast Alaska.

=== 10 November ===
List of shipwrecks: 10 November 1953
Ship	State	Description
Aurora	Netherlands	The cargo ship sank in the Mediterranean Sea off Cap de Fer, Algeria. She was being towed from Phillippeville, Algeria to an Italian port.

=== 11 November ===
List of shipwrecks: 11 November 1953
Ship	State	Description
Dorothy Lee	United States	The 102-ton fishing vessel was lost at San Hipolito Bay, 400 miles (640 km) south of San Diego.
Ragnhild I	Norway	The 110-ton trawler sank in a collision at Gibostad.
Superior	United States	The 107-ton fishing vessel foundered 58 miles southeast of the Cape Cod Lightship.

=== 15 November ===
List of shipwrecks: 15 November 1953
Ship	State	Description
Estelle S.	Canada	The 168-ton ship was lost at Wolf Island, Nova Scotia.

=== 16 November ===
List of shipwrecks: 16 November 1953
Ship	State	Description
Aura	Finland	The 1,912-ton cargo vessel was lost near Vaida Bay.
Belldock	United Kingdom	The 236-ton trawler stranded at Balta Island, Shetland Islands, Scotland. Refloated, condemned and scrapped.
Edda	Finland	The 184-ton fishing vessel capsized and sank off the north coast of the Snæfellsnes Peninsula.
Vittoria Claudia	Italy	The cargo ship collided with Perou (France) and sank in the English Channel 2.5 nautical miles (4.6 km) off Dungeness, Kent, with the loss of twenty of her 25 crew.

=== 21 November ===
List of shipwrecks: 21 November 1953
Ship	State	Description
Marita	Norway	The 265.1-foot (80.8 m), 1,960-ton cargo ship ran aground at Falske Bolsaks, southwest Rosnaes. She was re-floated and scrapped.

=== 24 November ===
List of shipwrecks: 24 November 1953
Ship	State	Description
Clara Louise	United States	The 103-ton vessel burned and sank 3 miles (4.8 km) from Boon Island in the Gulf of Maine.
Danzig	Canada	The cargo ship sank 48 miles (77 km) off Flint Island, Cape Breton, Nova Scotia, Canada. Six crew were rescued.
Pescadilla	Argentina	The 237-ton trawler sank in a collision at (35°58′S 56°20′W).
Vespa	United Kingdom	The tug was in collision with Malmo (United Kingdom) and sank in the River Thames at Woolwich. All five crew rescued.

=== 25 November ===
List of shipwrecks: 25 November 1953
Ship	State	Description
Marsworth	United Kingdom	The 519-ton cable layer, or cargo ship, collided with Milford (United Kingdom) in dense fog and sank off Great Yarmouth, Norfolk.

=== 26 November ===
List of shipwrecks: 26 November 1953
Ship	State	Description
Nuevo Dominicano	Dominican Republic	The 3,445-ton cruise ship ran aground 9–10 October off Nuevitas, Cuba. Refloated and ran aground again on 17 October on Punta Guarico, near Baracoa. Refloated on 26 November and quickly sank.

=== 28 November ===
List of shipwrecks: 28 November 1953
Ship	State	Description
Jankiki	Panama	The 5,950-ton cargo vessel was lost off Portugal due to cargo shift.
Hokushin Maru	Japan	The 892-ton cargo ship was wrecked on the east coast of Shiriyasaki.

=== 29 November ===
List of shipwrecks: 29 November 1953
Ship	State	Description
Halesius	United Kingdom	The cargo ship foundered in the Atlantic Ocean 50 nautical miles (93 km) north of Lisbon, Portugal. She was on a voyage from Casablanca, Morocco to Rotterdam, South Holland, Netherlands.

=== 30 November ===
List of shipwrecks: 30 November 1953
Ship	State	Description
Oliver Olson	United States	The cargo ship ran aground at Coquille, Oregon. She was only partially salvaged, the remaining wreck subsequently was incorporated into a jetty.

== December ==
=== 1 December ===
List of shipwrecks: 1 December 1953
Ship	State	Description
Hildina	United Kingdom	The 128.3-foot (39.1 m), 296-ton trawler capsized and sank 50 miles (80 km) northwest of Sule Skerry in rough seas after her trawl came fast on the sea bed. Six crew were lost with ten others rescued by Velia (United Kingdom).

=== 2 December ===
List of shipwrecks: 2 December 1953
Ship	State	Description
Hin Leong	Crown Colony of Singapore	The 250-ton cargo ship was sunk in a storm in Lingga Strait 15 miles (24 km) from Kuala Laja at the mouth of the Indragiri River, Sumatra.
Jong Kheng	Crown Colony of Singapore	The 175-ton cargo ship was lost in a storm in Lingga Strait, Sumatra.

=== 3 December ===
List of shipwrecks: 3 December 1953
Ship	State	Description
Aurora	Norway	The 260-ton ship stranded and sank north of Rauna.
Clara Louise	United States	The 103-ton vessel burned and sank 3 miles from Boon Island in the Gulf of Maine.

=== 4 December ===
List of shipwrecks: 3 December 1953
Ship	State	Description
Explorer	United States	The 387-ton vessel was lost at Fernandina Island, Galapagos Islands.
M. E. Johnson	Ireland	The 133-ton cargo ship was wrecked in heavy weather near Arklow, Ireland.

=== 8 December ===
List of shipwrecks: 8 December 1953
Ship	State	Description
Ruskin	Norway	The 281-ton cargo ship stranded on rocks and sank off Haugesund.
Stella Maris	Panama	The 845-ton cargo ship was lost south of the Cidreira Lighthouse, 150 miles (240 km) north of the Rio Grande.

=== 10 December ===
List of shipwrecks: 10 December 1953
Ship	State	Description
Victoria Marquez	Spain	The 168-ton fishing vessel was sunk in a collision off Cape St. Vincent.

=== 11 December ===
List of shipwrecks: 11 December 1953
Ship	State	Description
Madelyne E. Hebb	Canada	The 147-ton ship was wrecked on rocks at Western Bay, Conception Bay, Newfoundland, Canada.

=== 13 December ===
List of shipwrecks: 13 December 1953
Ship	State	Description
River Leven	United Kingdom	The trawler, a sold off Strath-class naval trawler, sprung a leak and sank under tow around 16.5 miles (26.6 km) off of Beadnell Bay 33 miles (53 km) north northeast of the Tyne.

=== 14 December ===
List of shipwrecks: 14 December 1953
Ship	State	Description
Dimitris	Greece	The 5,202-ton cargo ship ran aground off Middlesbrough, Yorkshire, United Kingdom. All sixteen crew rescued. Dimitris was declared a total loss.
Olympia	Greece	The ocean liner ran aground in Southampton Water, Hampshire, United Kingdom. Later refloated, repaired and returned to service.

=== 15 December ===
List of shipwrecks: 15 December 1953
Ship	State	Description
Brockley Combe	United Kingdom	The 662-ton coaster ran aground at the Minquiers, Jersey, Channel Islands and broke in two. All crew were rescued by the Jersey lifeboat.

=== 22 December ===
List of shipwrecks: 22 December 1953
Ship	State	Description
Francesca	Trieste	The 286-ton cargo vessel sank after an explosion in the engine room off Point Rogoznica.

=== 24 December ===
List of shipwrecks: 24 December 1953
Ship	State	Description
Alf Everard	United Kingdom	The 213-ton Thames barge exited the Medway and collided with a coaster, she then hit a second vessel before being rammed amidships by City of Johannesburg (United Kingdom) and sank in the Thames Estuary. All seven crew were rescued by the collier Alexander Kennedy (United Kingdom) which was one of the two earlier vessels with which she collided.
Gustaf Reuter	Sweden	The 1,290-ton tanker exploded and sank at Gothenburg, killing one of the eleven crew on board at the time.

=== 25 December ===
List of shipwrecks: 26 December 1953
Ship	State	Description
Columbus	United States	The 213-ton fishing vessel burned and sank after an engine room fire in an unknown location.

=== 26 December ===
List of shipwrecks: 26 December 1953
Ship	State	Description
Hanon	Sweden	The 2,030-ton cargo ship ran aground at Engey, Reykjavík. She was re-floated and scrapped.
Oklahoma	Sweden	The 5,914-ton cargo vessel broke in two and sank in a storm in the Atlantic Ocean 400 miles (640 km) northeast of St. John's, Newfoundland and Labrador. Thirty-six survivors were rescued by USNS Blue Jacket (United States Navy) and seven by Orion (Finland).

=== Unknown date ===
List of shipwrecks: unknown date in December 1953
Ship	State	Description
Roda	West Germany	The cargo ship sank in the North Sea on or after 3 December. She was being towed from Stavanger, Norway to Hamburg for scrapping. She was refloated in 1956 and scrapped at Hamburg.

== Unknown date ==
List of shipwrecks: Unknown date 1953
Ship	State	Description
Commiles	Australia	The trawler, a former Castle class naval trawler, was purchased by the Royal Australian Navy, used as a target and sunk off Rottnest Island west of Fremantle sometime in 1953.
Marti	Cuba	The schooner was wrecked in a hurricane.
Monique	France	The 240-ton, Société des Isles ferry left the Loyalty Islands on 31 July for Noumea and should have arrived on 1 August. A search started on 3 August, but she was never found. She had 75 passengers and crew, or 108 passengers and 18 crew. A former US Navy YF-class lighter was launched on 4 October 1945 at Port Chalmers as Avon and renamed Monique. It was suggested she may have been overloaded.
Pelican	Canada	The barge was scuttled.
Signa	Canada	The 189-ton ship was dismantled and disposed of by sinking.

== Sources ==
- Jordan, Roger (1999). The World's Merchant Fleets, 1939. London: Chatham Publishing. ISBN 1-86176-023-X.
- Sawyer, L. A.; Mitchell, W. H. (1974). Victory Ships and Tankers. Newton Abbot: David and Charles. ISBN 0 7153 6036 1.
- Mitchell, WH; Sawyer, LA (1990). The Empire Ships (Second ed.). London, New York, Hamburg, Hong Kong: Lloyd's of London Press Ltd. ISBN 1-85044-275-4.
- Ogley, Bob; Currie, Ian; Davison, Mark (1991). The Kent Weather Book. Brasted Chart: Froglets Publications Ltd. ISBN 1-872337-35-X.
- Sawyer, L. A.; Mitchell, W. H. (1985). The Liberty Ships (2nd ed.). London: Lloyd's of London Press Ltd. ISBN 1-85044-049-2.
