= Malmö (disambiguation) =

Malmö is a Swedish city in the Malmö Municipality or the City of Malmö.

Malmö or Malmo may also refer to:

- Malmo, Nebraska, a village in the US
- Malmoe, Queensland, a locality in the North Burnett Region, Queensland, Australia
- SS Malmö, a number of ships
- Malmö FF, a football team
