= Springcreek =

Springcreek may refer to -

Places

- Springcreek Township, Miami County, Ohio

Ships

- MV Springcreek, a British coaster in service 1948-51
