= SS S. R. Kirby =

Great Lakes freighter sunk in a 1916 storm on Lake Superior

Coordinates: 47.480000°N 88.250000°W

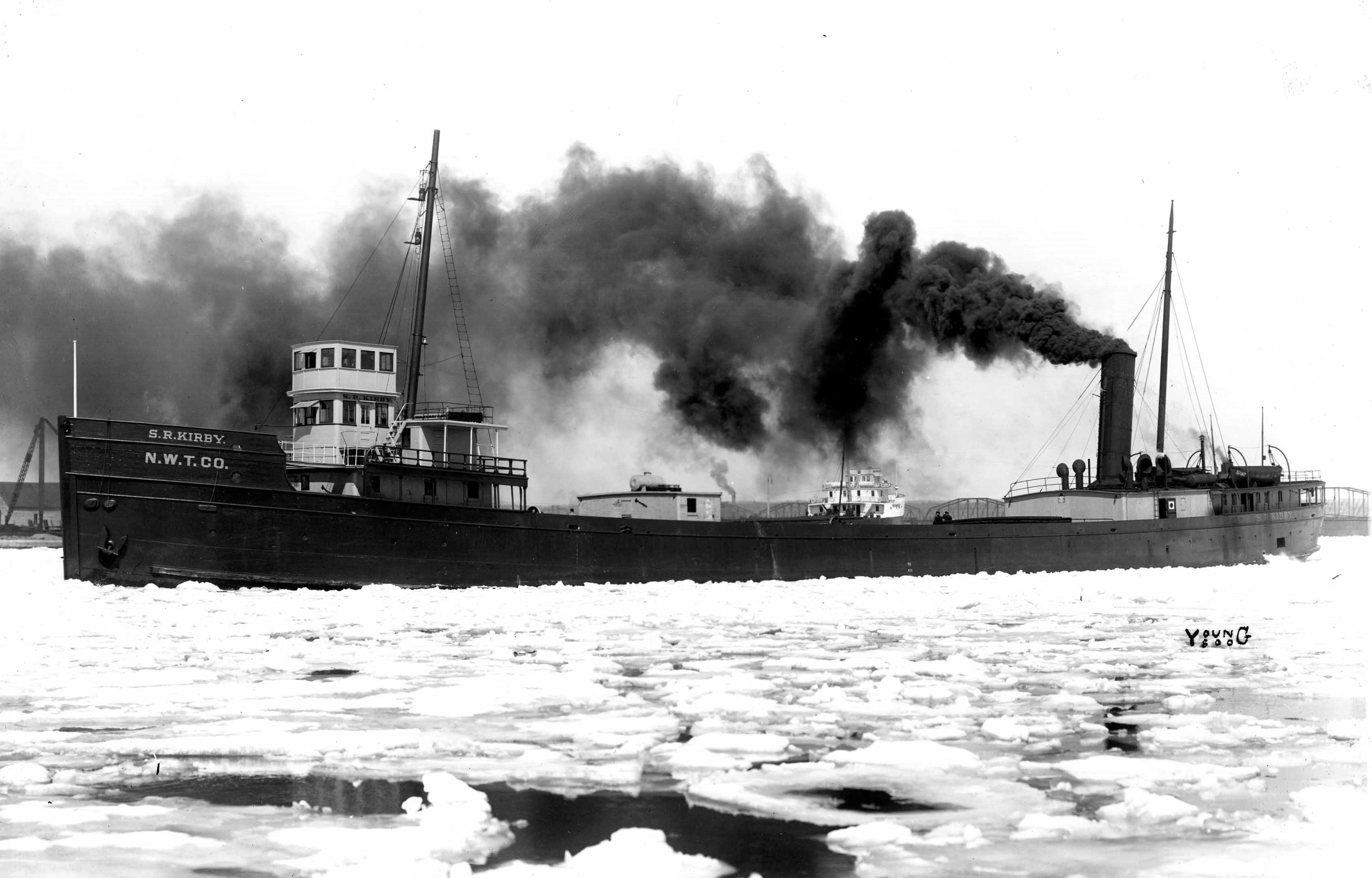
- S. R. Kirby in the Soo Locks c. 1900

History

United States
- Name: S. R. Kirby
- Namesake: Stephen R. Kirby
- Operator: Northwestern Transportation Company
- Port of registry: Detroit, Michigan, United States
- Builder: Detroit Dry Dock Company
- Yard number: 100
- Launched: May 17/24, 1890
- In service: June 1890
- Out of service: May 8, 1916
- Identification: U.S. Registry #116325
- Fate: Sank on Lake Superior
- Wreck discovered: June 2018

General characteristics
- Tonnage: 2338.68 grt; 1823.28 nrt
- Length: 311.6 feet (95.0 m) LOA; 294 feet (90 m) LBP
- Beam: 42 feet (13 m)
- Depth: 23 feet (7.0 m)
- Installed power: 2 × Scotch marine boilers
- Propulsion: 1,500 hp (1,100 kW) triple expansion steam engine
- Crew: 22

SS S. R. Kirby was a composite-hulled bulk carrier that served on the Great Lakes of North America from her construction in 1890 to her sinking in 1916. On May 8, 1916, while heading across Lake Superior with a cargo of iron ore and the steel barge George E. Hartnell in tow, she ran into a storm and sank with the loss of all but two of her 22-man crew off Eagle Harbor, Michigan (on the Keweenaw Peninsula). For over 102 years the location of S. R. Kirby's wreck remained unknown, until June 2018, when her wreck was discovered by the Great Lakes Shipwreck Historical Society (GLSHS) in 825 feet (251 m) of water, completely broken up.

== History ==
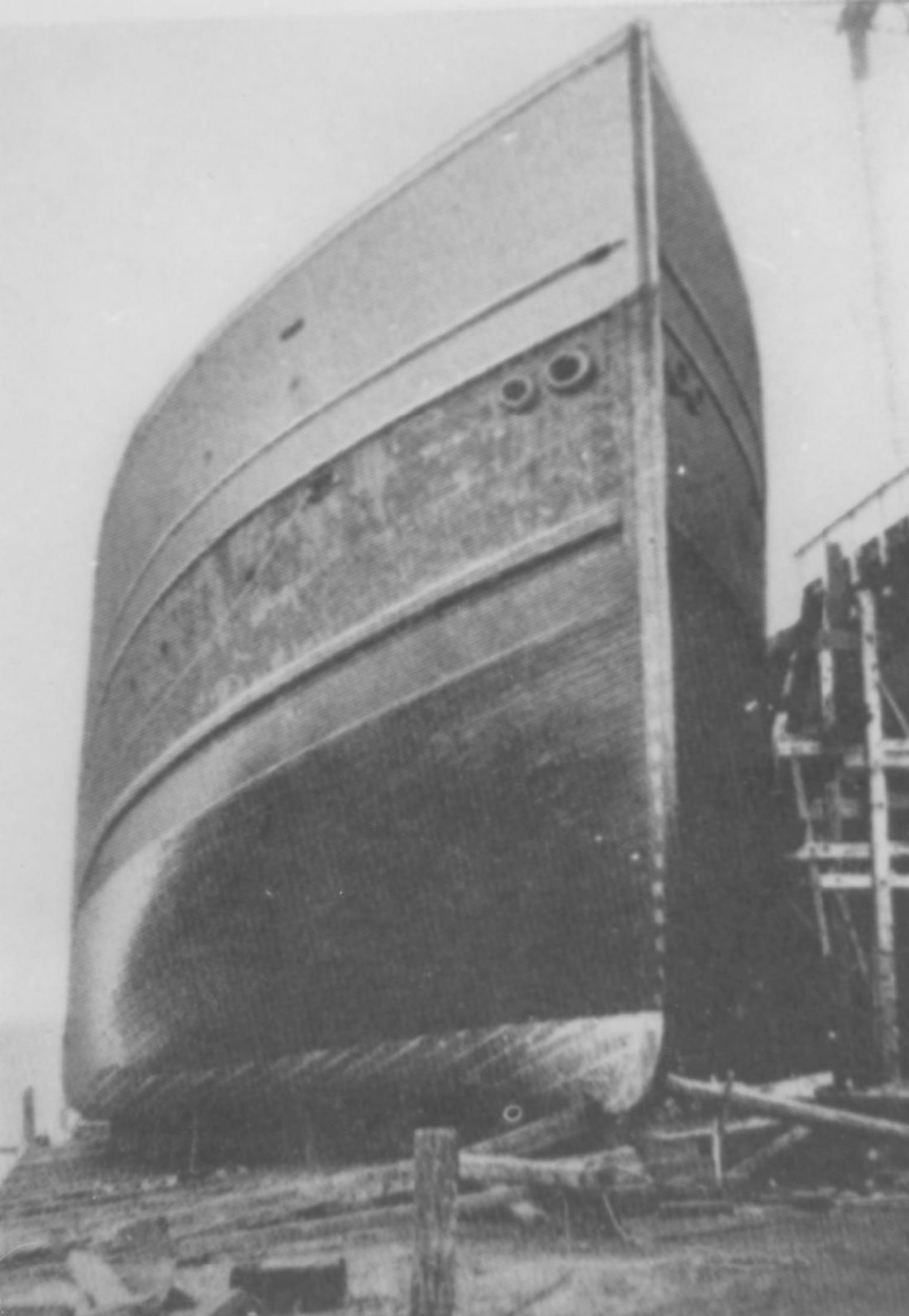
S. R. Kirby under construction in Wyandotte

=== Design and construction ===
S. R. Kirby (Official number 116325) was built in 1890 by the Detroit Dry Dock Company in Wyandotte, Michigan. She was a composite-hulled ship, meaning she had an iron frame and a wooden hull, constructed from white oak. (Note: S. R. Kirby was the final one of nine composite bulk carriers built on the Great Lakes between 1886 and 1890. These other ships were (in order of construction): Susan E. Peck (1886), Fayette Brown (1887), E. M. Peck (1888), Livingstone (1889), Manchester (1889), John Owen (1889) and Thomas W. Palmer (1889). Two of these vessels, John Owen and Thomas W. Palmer were also lost on Lake Superior) She was launched on August 17, 1890, (one source states August 24) as hull number 100. She was named after Stephen R. Kirby, father of well-known naval architect Frank E. Kirby. (Note: Coincidentally, after the construction of S. R. Kirby, the Detroit Dry Dock Company built a steel paddle steamer named Frank E. Kirby (hull number 101).)

The hull had an overall length of 311.6 feet (95.0 m) (one source states 308 feet (94 m)) and a keel length of 294 feet (90 m), making her the largest composite Great Lakes freighter ever built. Her beam was 42 feet (13 m) wide and her hull was 23 feet (7.0 m) (other sources also state 21 feet [6.4 m] or 26 feet [7.9 m]) deep. She had gross register tonnage of 2338.68 (one source states 2479), and net register tonnage of 1823.28. She had two decks and a cargo capacity of 3300 tons.

She was equipped with an 84 rpm 1,500-horsepower (1,100 kW) (one source states 1,250-horsepower (930 kW)) triple expansion steam engine with pistons which had bores of 21 inches (53 cm), 33 inches (84 cm) and 56 inches (140 cm) and a stroke of 42 inches (110 cm). The engine was powered by steam provided by two cylindrical 12.6 feet (3.8 m) by 11 feet (3.4 m) Scotch marine boilers, each of which had a working pressure of 160 psi. Both the engine and the boilers were built in Detroit, Michigan, by the Detroit Dry Dock Company.

She was the first freighter on the Great Lakes to be equipped with electric lights.

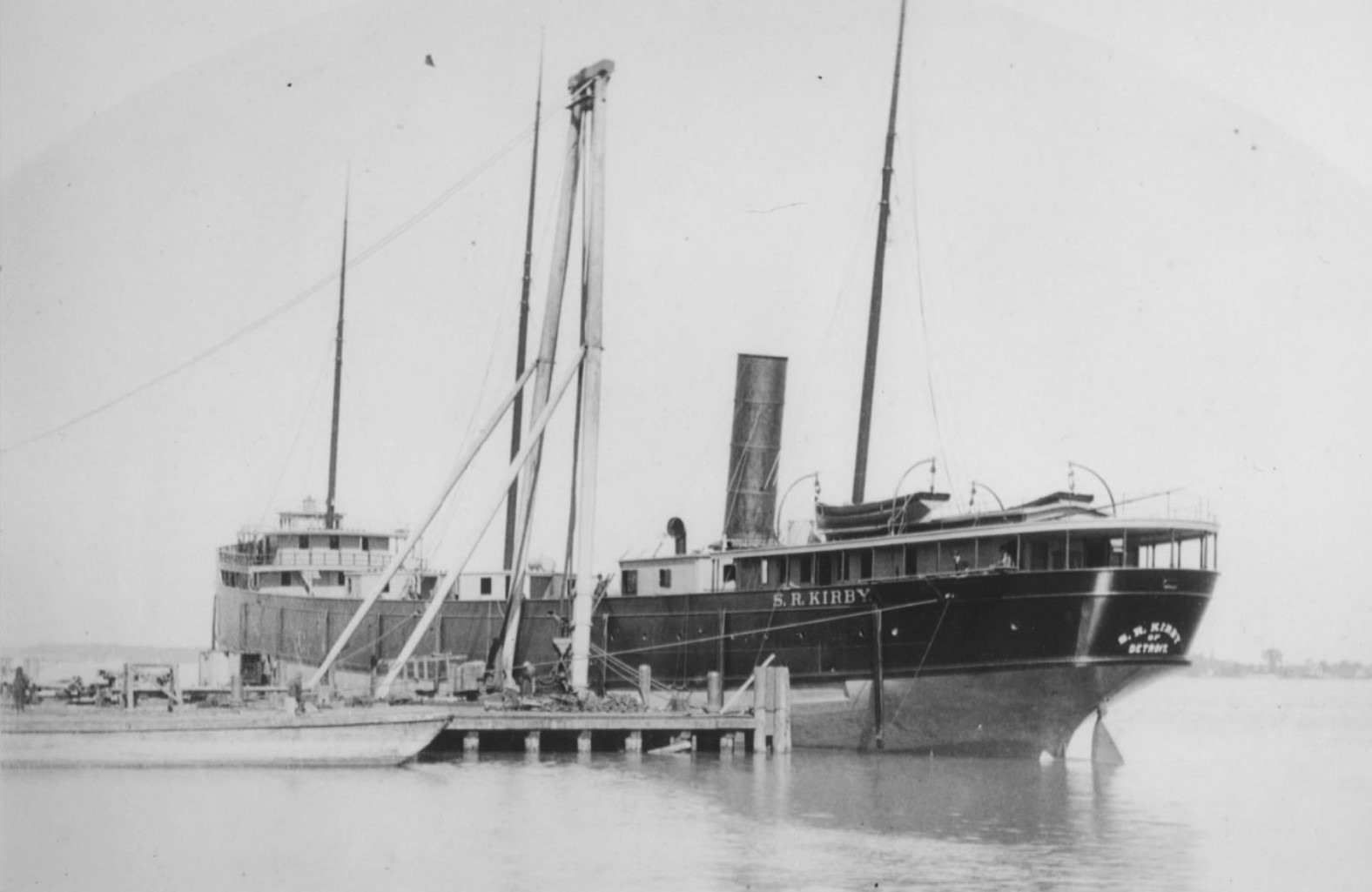
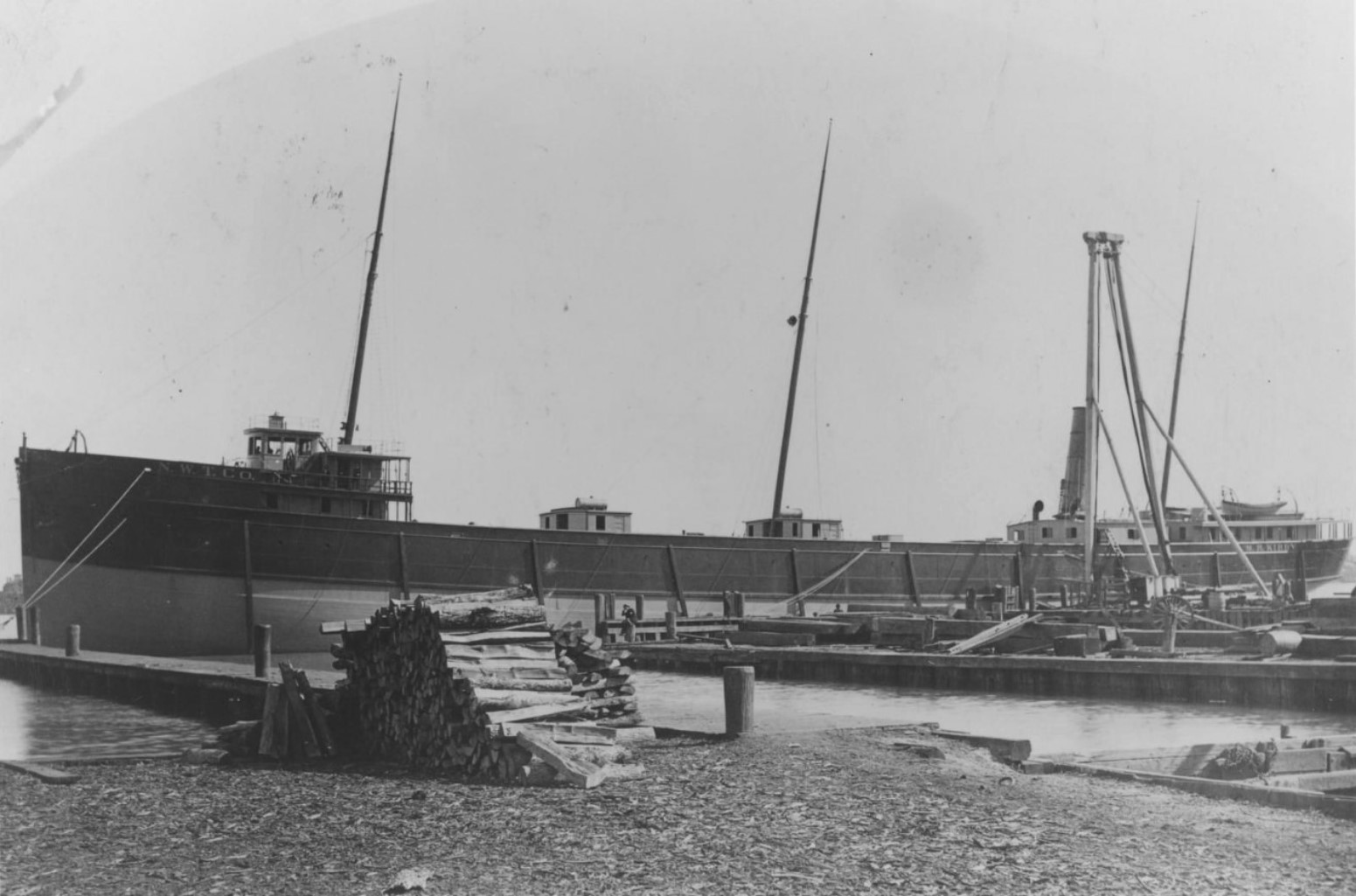
S. R. Kirby being fitted out in Wyandotte, Michigan

=== Service history ===
S. R. Kirby was built for the North Western Transportation Company of Detroit, Michigan. She received her enrollment in Detroit on June 13, 1890; her home port was Detroit. She made her maiden voyage in June 1890, during which she carried the largest load of iron ore ever to pass through the Soo Locks.

On April 16, 1892 after leaving Duluth, Minnesota with a cargo of wheat, S. R. Kirby was forced to return to port after about 7 miles (11 km), on account of heavy pack ice. Beginning in 1896, S. R. Kirby towed the 352 feet (107 m) steel barge George E. Hartnell, which she would tow for the remainder of her career.

On the morning of October 7, 1897, while entering the harbor in Erie, Pennsylvania, S. R. Kirby was blown ashore. It was initially suggested that if not freed quickly, Lake Erie would smash her to pieces. However, when she was released on October 8, it was discovered that she had sustained no damage.

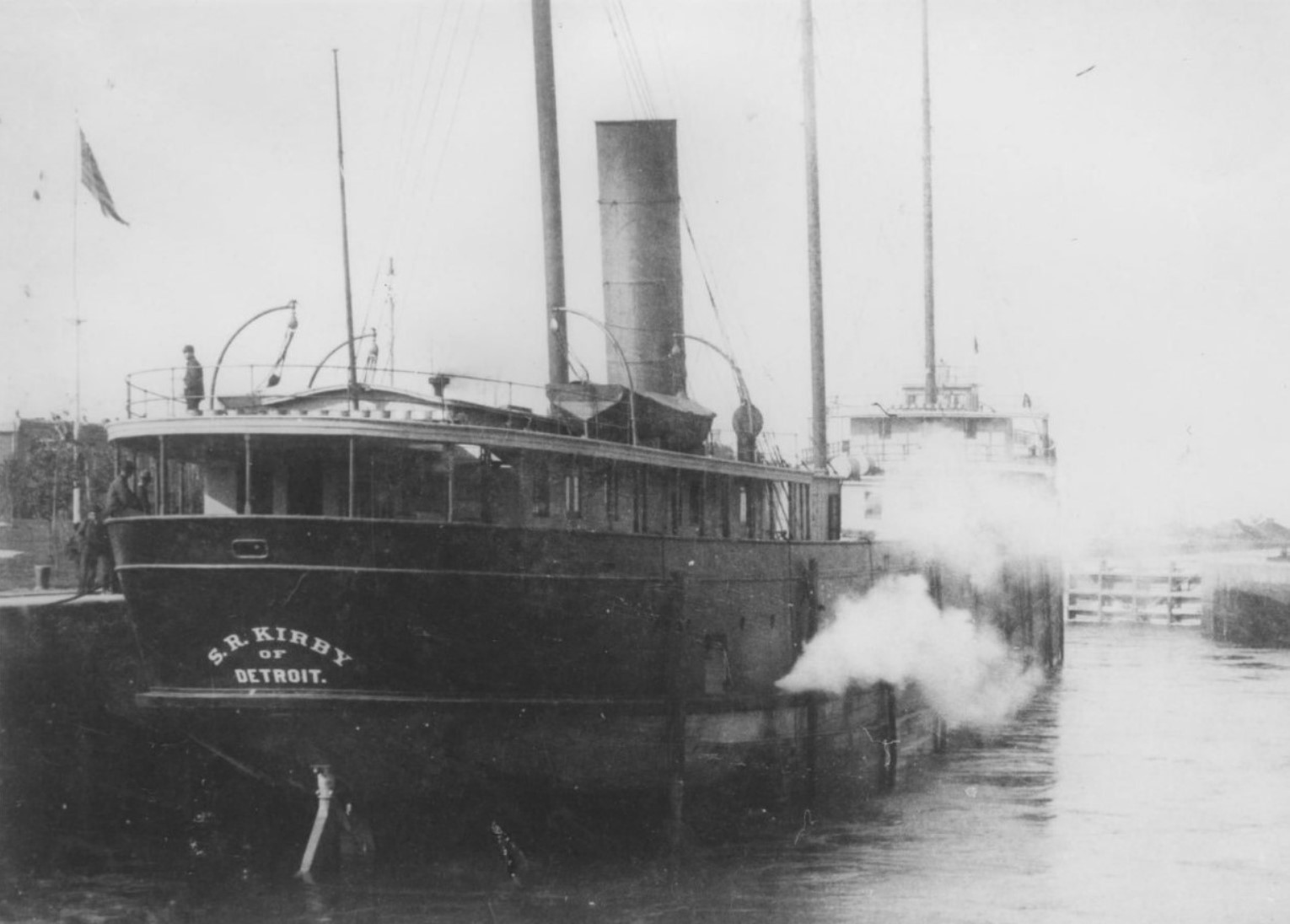
S. R. Kirby in the Sault Ste. Marie, Michigan c. 1897

On the morning of September 8, 1904, while bound for Buffalo, New York, with a cargo of iron ore, S. R. Kirby ran hard aground on the rocks roughly a 1 mile (1.6 km) off Windmill Point, Ontario on Lake Erie. She was freed at about 7:00 A.M. on September 9, 1904, by the tugs W.G. Mason and S.W. Gee, after jettisoning about 500 tons of her cargo into the schooner West Side and the scow Buffalo. After being released, she was towed to Buffalo.

On June 27, 1914 S. R. Kirby was forced to cast off George E. Hartnell outside of Duluth Harbor due to a severe storm; George E. Hartnell eventually drifted on to Park Point and was freed a few days later.

=== Final voyage ===
On May 7 or 8, 1916, after loading iron ore bound for Cleveland, Ohio, S. R. Kirby left Ashland, Wisconsin under the command of Captain David Girardin, with the steel barge George E. Hartnell in tow. At the time, the weather was calm. Later during the day, a heavy northwest gale began, with the wind speed measured at 76 miles per hour (122 km/h) in Duluth, Minnesota. As S. R. Kirby and George E. Hartnell approached the Keweenaw Peninsula, the weather became worse. At around 10:45 A.M. on May 8, as the two ships approached Eagle Harbor, Michigan, S. R. Kirby was struck by a massive wave, broke up, and sank in about a minute. George E. Hartnell broke loose and was picked up by the steamer E.H. Utley.

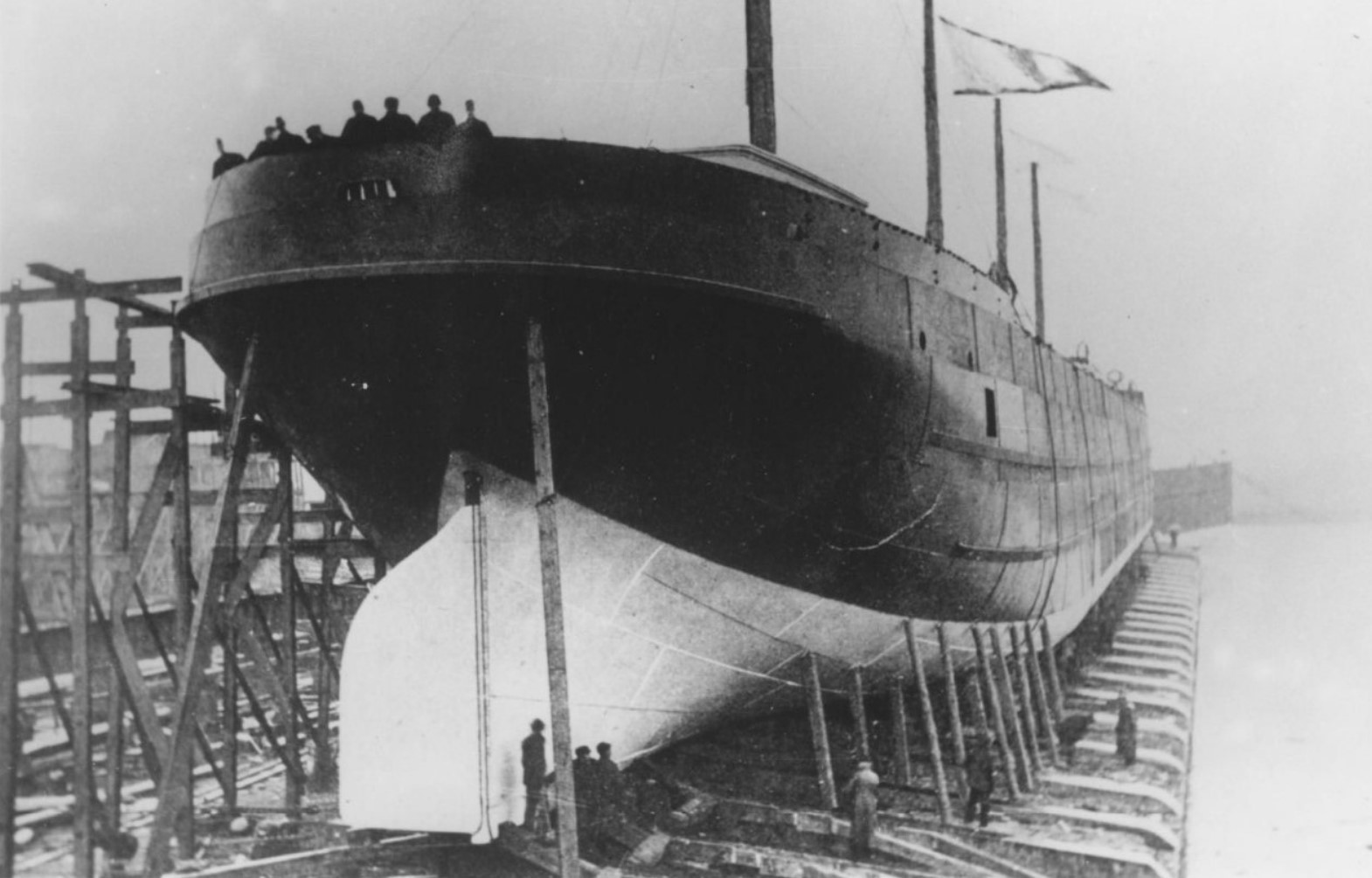
George E. Hartnell

Two crewmen, Second Mate Joseph Mudra of Chicago, Illinois, and fireman Otto Lindquist of Pequaming, Michigan, survived. Mudra was picked up by the freighter Harry A. Berwind and Lindquist was saved by the freighter Joseph Block. Mudra recounted:

The steamer broke in two without a moments warning. As the ship went down, which took up so little time that I could scarcely believe my eyes, cabins broke loose and rafts floated. I did not see any of the men come up out of the forecastle, and while I saw some of them afterwards clinging to bits of wreckage, I believe most of them were caught in the forecastle and were unable to get out.

Captain Girardin's English bulldog Tige also survived and was delivered to Girardin's widow in Detroit.

After her sinking, S. R. Kirby was valued at $125,000. It was speculated that she was heavily overloaded or improperly loaded and wouldn't have had much of a chance of survival in the storm.

== S. R. Kirby wreck ==
=== Discovery ===
In June 2018 the Great Lakes Shipwreck Historical Society (GLSHS) were conducting a search for shipwrecks off the coast of the Keweenaw Peninsula. They located what appeared to be wreckage but were unsure if it was a shipwreck. They returned to the site the following year to identify the wreck, suspecting that it might be the wreck of S. R. Kirby. The director of marine operations of the GLSHS, Darryl Ertel Jr. and his team used a remotely operated vehicle to confirm the wreck was S. R. Kirby based on the nature of the wreckage.

Discovery of S. R. Kirby's wreck was made public in July 2019.

=== S. R. Kirby today ===
The remains of S. R. Kirby rest in 825 feet (251 m) of water off Eagle Harbor, Michigan. Her wreck is completely broken up and strewn over a large area. There are several sections of the hull that still show the iron frame with the wooden hull attached. Bruce Lynn of the GLSHS remarked that the wreck of S. R. Kirby "looks like an explosion on the bottom of the lake".

The wreck of S. R. Kirby is the second-deepest shipwreck discovered on the Great Lakes, behind the steel bulk freighter Scotiadoc (discovered in 870 feet (270 m) of water in 2013), and tied with the steel package freighter Hudson (also discovered in 2019).
