= MV Georgios =

A number of motor vessels have been named Georgios, including:

- MV Georgios (1941), a former Empire ship, which was named Georgios from 1964 to 1978
- MV Georgios K, a Panamanian coaster in service 1958–62
