= SS Hudson (1887) =

Steel-hulled Great Lakes package freighter

Coordinates: 47.443683°N 88.393383°W

- SS Hudson

History

United States
- Name: Hudson
- Operator: Western Transit Company
- Port of registry: United States, Buffalo, New York
- Builder: Detroit Dry Dock Company
- Yard number: 82
- Launched: November 16/17, 1887
- In service: 1888
- Out of service: September 16, 1901
- Identification: U.S. Registry #95953
- Fate: Lost with all hands on Lake Superior
- Wreck discovered: July 2019

General characteristics
- Tonnage: 2,294.14 GRT; 1,853.37 NRT
- Length: 288 ft (88 m)
- Beam: 41 ft (12 m)
- Depth: 22.58 ft (6.88 m)
- Installed power: 2 × Scotch marine boilers
- Propulsion: 1,300 hp (970 kW) triple expansion steam engine
- Crew: 25 (some sources state 24)

SS Hudson was a steel-hulled package freighter that served on the Great Lakes from her construction in 1887 to her sinking in 1901. On September 16, 1901, while heading across Lake Superior with a cargo of wheat and flax, she ran into a storm and sank with the loss of all 25 crew off Eagle Harbor, Michigan (located on the Keweenaw Peninsula). For nearly 118 years the location of Hudson's wreck remained unknown, until in July 2019 her wreck was found in 825 feet (251 m) of water, completely intact.

In all likelihood, she is the second deepest shipwreck on the Great Lakes, behind the bulk freighter Scotiadoc (discovered in 2013 at a depth of 870 feet [270 m]), and tied with the composite bulk freighter S.R. Kirby (discovered in 2018).

== History ==
=== Construction ===
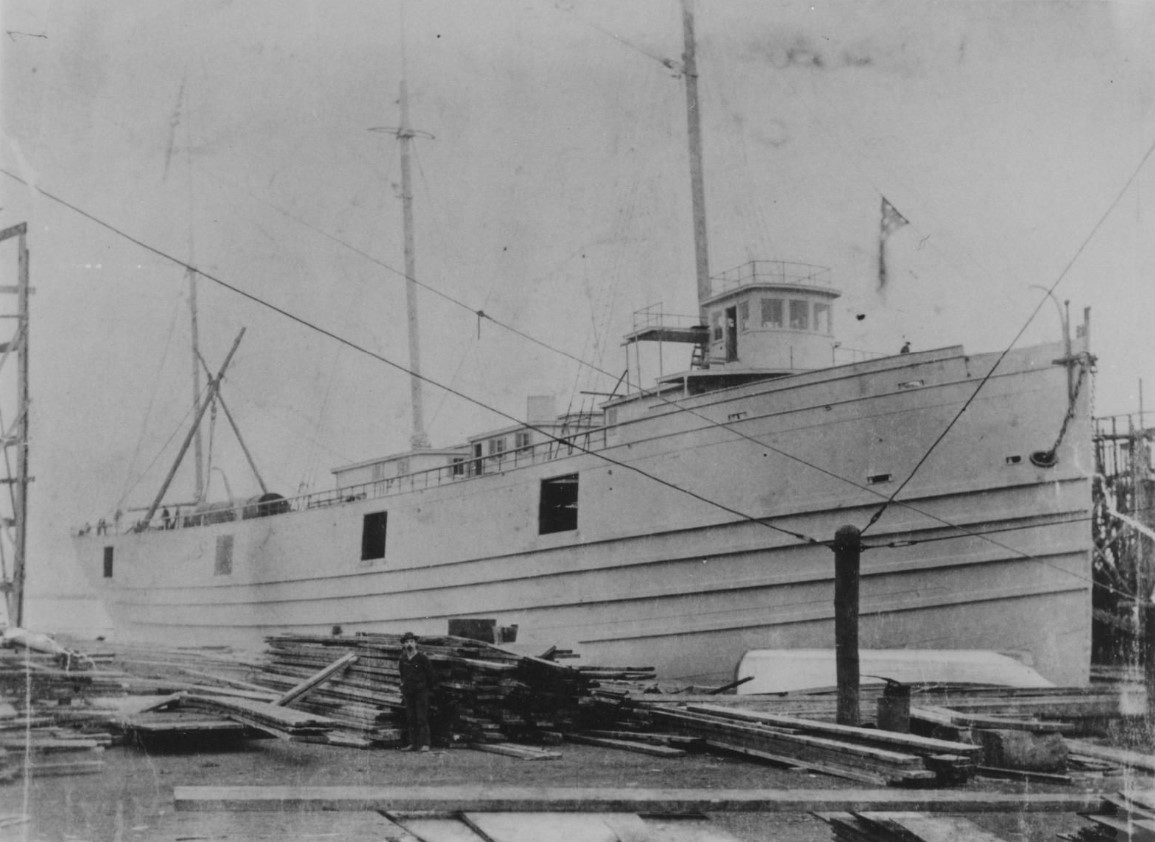
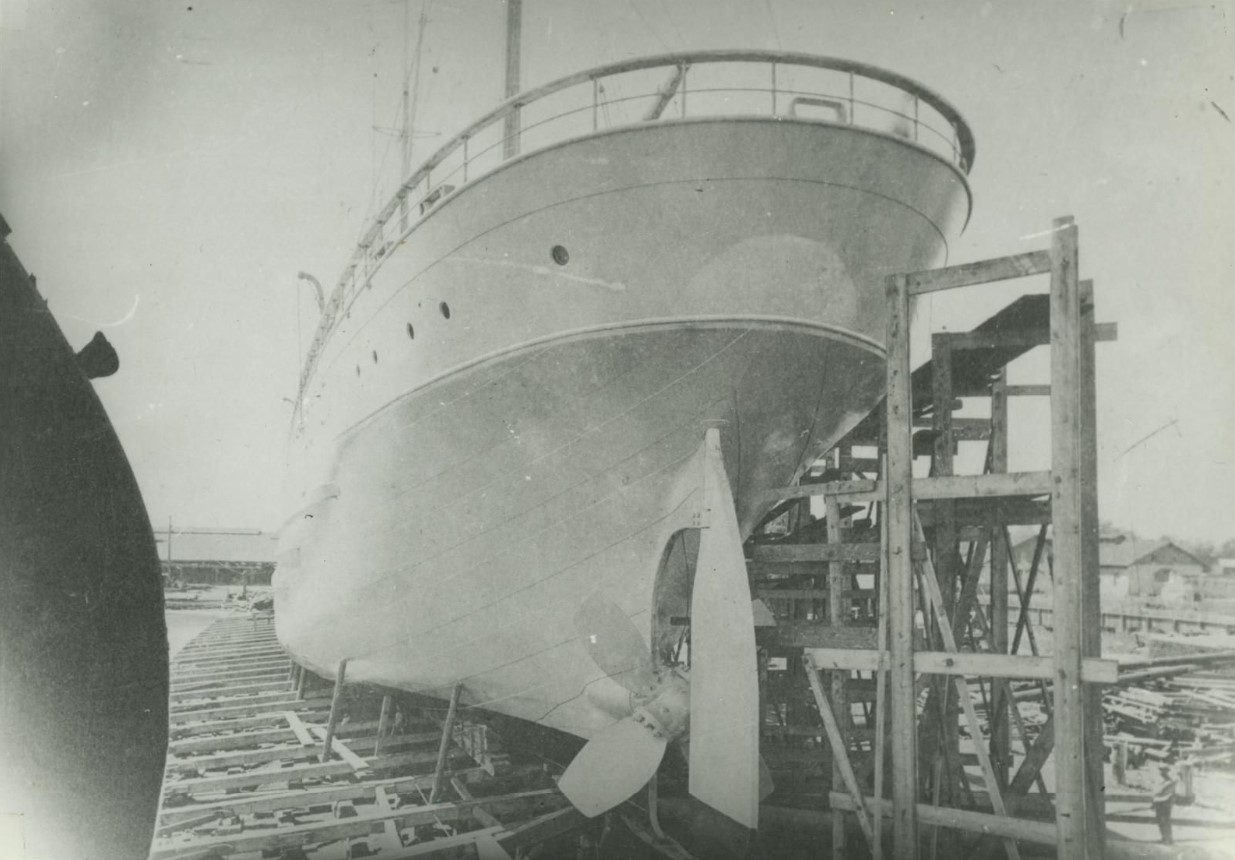
Construction of Hudson in Wyandotte

Hudson (Official number 95953) was designed by Frank E. Kirby and was built in 1888 by the Detroit Dry Dock Company of Wyandotte, Michigan. She was launched on November 16/17, 1887 as hull number 82. She cost $275,000 to build.

Her steel (some sources state iron) hull was 288 feet (88 m) long, 41 feet (12 m) wide and 22.58 feet (6.88 m) deep. She had a gross register tonnage of 2294.14 tons, a net register tonnage of 1853.37 tons and a cargo capacity of 2,650 tons.

The ship was equipped with an 80 rpm 1,300-horsepower (970 kW) triple expansion steam engine with pistons which had bores of 23 inches (58 cm), 36 inches (91 cm) and 62 inches (160 cm) and a stroke of 48 inches (120 cm). The engine was powered by steam provided by two 11.6 feet (3.5 m) by 18 feet (5.5 m) Scotch marine boilers, which had a working pressure of 160 psi; both the engine and the boilers were built by the Detroit Engine Works of Detroit, Michigan. She was equipped with a single fixed pitch propeller with a diameter of 13.6 feet (4.1 m). She had an identical sister ship named Harlem.

=== Service history ===
Hudson was built for the Western Transit Company (a subsidiary of the New York Central Railway Company) of Buffalo, New York. On May 9, 1888 she was enrolled in Detroit, but on May 15, 1888 she was re-registered to Buffalo.

On October 24, 1890, while in Duluth, Minnesota, Hudson collided with the wooden steam barge City of Nicolet, sending her to the bottom of Lake Superior.

=== Final voyage ===
On September 15, 1901, Hudson left Duluth under the command of Captain Angus J. McDonald, with a cargo of wheat and flax bound for Buffalo. Around the time she passed the Apostle Islands, a storm had kicked up. On the morning of September 16, 1901, several lighthouse keepers in Eagle River, Michigan reported seeing Hudson dead in the water in listing badly. Eventually, she rolled over and sank, taking the lives of all 25 (some sources state 24) crew members.

=== Aftermath ===
One report after the sinking stated that the identity of the ship was a mystery, and it was believed that another ship sighted in the area may have rescued the crew of Hudson. Another report stated that due to the lack of wreckage, the sinking of Hudson was "probably a mistake". But on September 20, 1901, a fishing boat found two masts, one painted black and the other yellow, which matched the colour of Hudson's masts. Over the next few days, much more wreckage, and a few bodies from Hudson came ashore.

After her sinking, it was speculated that her cargo shifted, causing her to roll over and leading to her sinking. It was also believed that she may have had engine trouble, which could also have contributed to her sinking.

At the time of her loss, Hudson was valued at $180,000.

== Hudson wreck ==
=== Wreck discovery ===
In mid-2019, Jerry Eliason of Cloquet, Minnesota and Kraig Smith of Rice Lake, Wisconsin were searching for the wrecks of Hudson, the paddle steamer Sunbeam and the composite bulk freighter S.R. Kirby, which had already been found by the Great Lakes Shipwreck Historical Society (GLSHS) in June 2018, but had not yet been made public. Eventually, Eliason and Smith found a likely looking target in over 800 feet (240 m) of water about 4 miles (6.4 km) off Eagle Harbor, Michigan. In mid-July, they set out to the target. When they were above the wreck, they dropped a camera attached to a 1,000 feet (300 m) cable. After passing over the wreck a few times, the camera picked up the letters HUD on the vessel's stern, confirming that the wreck was Hudson. Discovery of her wreck was made public in September 2019.

=== Hudson today ===
The wreck of the Hudson rests in 825 feet (251 m) of water, with her hull completely intact. Her bow is buried in the lake bottom, with her stern rising about 20 feet (6.1 m) from the bottom. All that remains is her steel hull, because when she sank, her cabins broke free and floated away. Due to the depth of her wreck, she is almost impossible for divers to explore. Eliason reported that Hudson and S.R. Kirby, both resting at the same depth, are likely the second deepest shipwrecks ever located on the Great Lakes, after the freighter Scotiadoc which rests in 870 feet (270 m) of water near the Sleeping Giant.
