= Moira Sound =

Inlet in the U.S. state of Alaska

Coordinates: 55.0367°N 132.0700°W

Moira Sound is a branching inlet on the east side of the southern end of Prince of Wales Island in the U.S. state of Alaska. It is situated within the Tongass National Forest.

== Geography ==
The entrance to this sound, on the west side of Clarence Strait, 25 miles (40 km) northward of Cape Chacon, lies in about latitude 55° 02’, and is about 2 miles (3.2 km) in width. There are several islets within it. Moira Sound penetrates Prince of Wales Island about 6 miles (9.7 km) to the southwest, then turns sharply to the northwest for 6–8 miles (9.7–12.9 km), heading near the heads of Cholmondeley Sound, which comes from north-northeast, and Tliakak Bay, which comes from the southwest from Cordova Bay. The land in the neighborhood of Moira Sound is high and rather steep towards Clarence Strait; but north of Wedge Island, (in latitude 55° 07’) the straight and compact shores are moderately elevated, and the interior country is composed of lofty though uneven mountains, with a forest of pine trees from the water side nearly to their summits.

== Hydrography ==
The best entrance is between Adams Point and Moira Rock. Soundings indicate generally deep water. There are several small indentations, islands, rocks, and reefs on the southern shore of the sound. At 8 miles (13 km) from Moira Rock the sound divides. Western Arm has a length of 2.5 miles (4.0 km), and then divides into two short arms. South Arm trends about south for 5 miles (8.0 km) and has reefs bare at low water. There are several groups of islands across the entrance to Moira Sound, the two principal ones of which are Moira Rock, bare, 30 feet (9.1 m) high, and marked by a light, and White Bock, which is the bare northeast face of the southeastern one of the two largest wooded islands. There is no passage into Moira Sound south of White Rock. Between Moira Rock and the first island southeastward are three kelp-marked rocks, awash at lowest tides. A kelp patch lies 3/8 to 1/2 mile north-northeast of White Rock, and a ledge bare at low water lies .25 miles (0.40 km) east-northeast of the rock. Adams Point, the north point at the entrance, is the eastern end of a high peninsula formed by the North Arm and Port Johnson.

== History ==
In 1914, prospecting in the vicinity of Moira Sound amounted to little more than the annual assessment work required by law. Between the head of Moira North Arm and Mineral Lake the copper mines, once active, were idle throughout the year and the only person in the region was a man who looked after the various properties and as opportunity offered did a little prospecting. Efforts were made to prospect further the Navaho claim, formerly called the Hope claim, which lies between Cannery Cove and North Arm. No productive work was done during last year on any of the properties adjacent to Niblack. Only one person now lives in this region, and although part of his time is spent in prospecting little new work has been accomplished. The strongly faulted and deformed structures in this region increased the difficulty and expense of mining. A small prospect lies in the small bight north of Black Point, at the entrance of Niblack Anchorage. The lead had been opened by means of a vertical shaft, and by a short adit. The country rock is an agglomeratic or pyroclastic igneous rock trending east and dipping south. Not far away, an infaulted mass of black shales and slates are exposed.
