= Clarence Strait =

Strait in southeast Alaska, U.S.

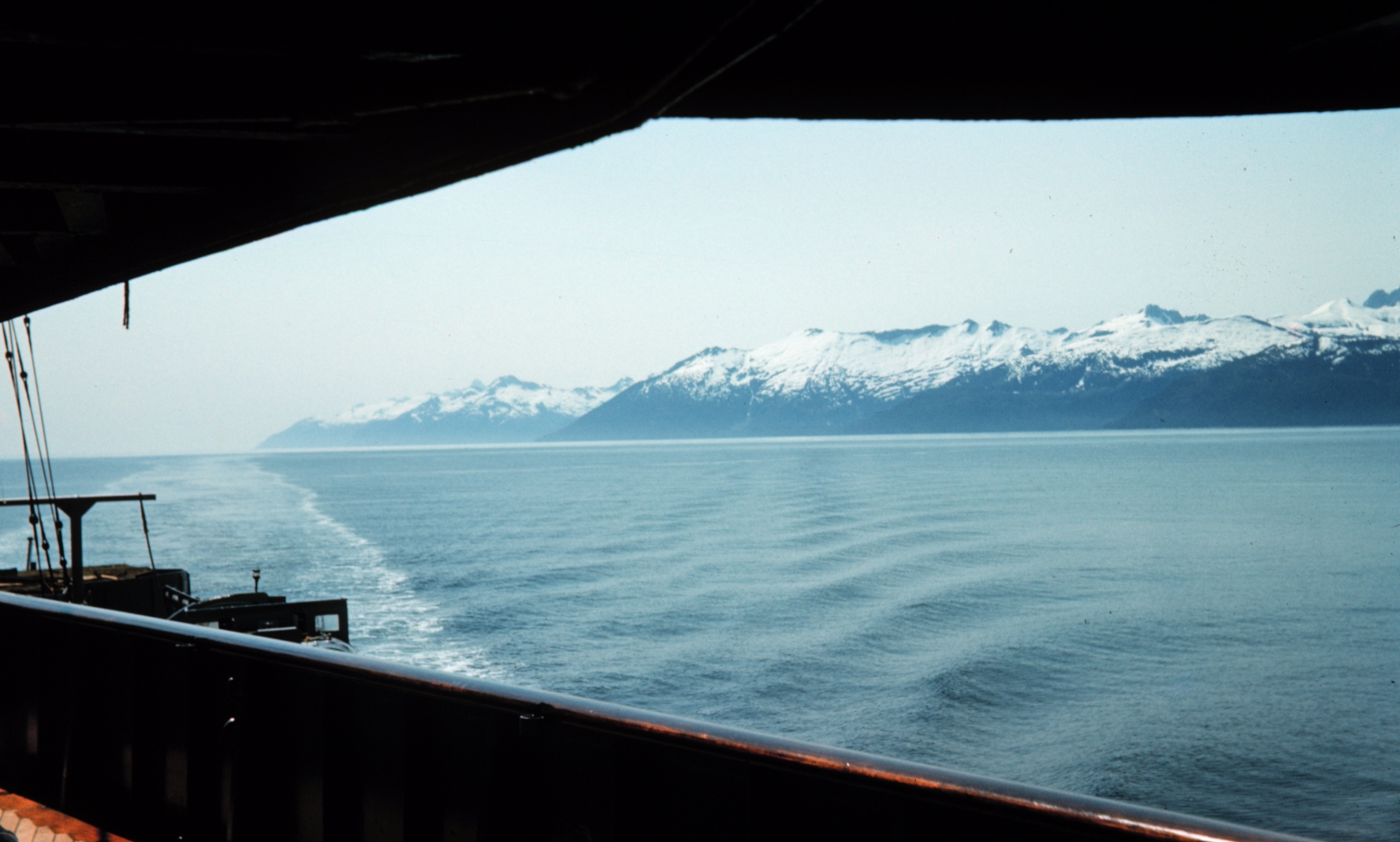
- As seen from the USC&GS ship Pathfinder in 1958

- Location in Alaska
- Location: Alexander Archipelago, Alaska
- Coordinates: 55°59′20″N 132°36′57″W
- Type: Strait
- Etymology: Named for Prince William, Duke of Clarence
- Max. length: 126 mi (203 km)

Clarence Strait, originally Duke of Clarence Strait, is a strait in southeastern Alaska, in the United States in the Alexander Archipelago. The strait separates Prince of Wales Island, on the west side, from Revillagigedo Island and Annette Island, on the east side. Clarence Strait is 126 miles (203 km) long, extending from Dixon Entrance to Sumner Strait. Moira Sound is on the west side of the strait.

Clarence Strait was named in 1793 by George Vancouver in honor of Prince William, Duke of Clarence. Jacinto Caamaño, who had explored the region a year before Vancouver, named the strait Entrada de Nuestra Senora del Carmen.

The Guard Island Light and Lincoln Rocks Light, both located adjacent to Clarence Strait, were important aids-to-navigation in the Clarence Strait area in the pre-automated era.

== Swimming ==
The first person to swim across Clarence Strait was Michelle Macy, who accomplished the feat in 6 hours 46 minutes on 5 July 2010.

== See also ==
- Alaska boundary dispute
- Grindall Island
