= Vaida Bay =

Bay of the Barents Sea, Russia

Coordinates: 69°56′32″N 32°01′10″E

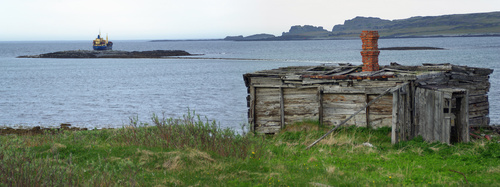

Vaida Bay (Russian: Вайда губа, Vaida Guba) is a body of water in the Barents Sea on the northwestern coast of the Rybachy Peninsula, Murmansk Oblast, Russia.

A settlement of the same name, Vayda-Guba, sits on its shore.
