= SS Arnhem =

A number of steamships have been named Arnhem, including:

- SS Arnhem (1930), a cargo ship in service 1946–47
- SS Arnhem (1943), a Hansa A Type cargo ship in service 1945–46
- SS Arnhem (1946), a cargo liner in service 1946–68
