= USS Migrant =

History

United States NavyUnited States
- Name: USS Migrant
- Builder: Geo. Lawley & Sons, Neponset, Massachusetts
- Launched: 1929
- Acquired: 21 March 1942
- Commissioned: 19 May 1942
- Decommissioned: 3 August 1945
- Stricken: 13 August 1945
- Fate: Transferred to War Shipping Administration for disposal, 6 January 1946

History

Dominican RepublicDominican Republic
- Name: "Fimbert"
- Fate: Sank from an explosion 13 July 1953

General characteristics
- Type: Schooner
- Displacement: 661 long tons (672 t)
- Length: 223 ft 3 in (68.05 m)
- Beam: 34 ft (10 m)
- Draft: 14 ft (4.3 m)
- Speed: 11 knots (20 km/h; 13 mph)
- Armament: 1 × 3 in (76 mm) gun; 4 × 20 mm guns; 4 × depth charge tracks

USS Migrant (IX‑66) was a schooner of the United States Navy during World War II. The ship was built in 1929 by George Lawley & Sons, Neponset, Massachusetts, and acquired from Carl Tucker by the Port Director, New York, for the US Navy on 21 March 1942, converted by the Sullivan Shipyard, Brooklyn, New York, and commissioned on 19 May 1942.

== Service history ==
Acquired originally for use in the 3rd Naval District, Migrant was assigned to the Eastern Sea Frontier following her conversion and commissioning. Until the spring of 1944 she conducted anti-submarine patrols from New York, along the southern New England coast. Transferred on 30 April 1944 to the 1st Naval District at Boston, she conducted ASW patrols along the northern New England coast for the remainder of her Navy career.

Migrant, ordered inactivated in June 1945, was decommissioned at East Boston on 3 August. Struck from the Naval Vessel Register ten days later, she remained at East Boston until 6 January 1946 when she was turned over to the War Shipping Administration for disposal.

On 13 July 1953 the motor-schooner, now registered in the Dominican Republic and named "Fimbert", sank after an explosion off Cape Samana, Dominican Republic.
