= Lincoln Rock Light =

Lighthouse located on Lincoln Island, a small islet of Alaska, U.S.

Lincoln Rock Light Lincoln Rock West
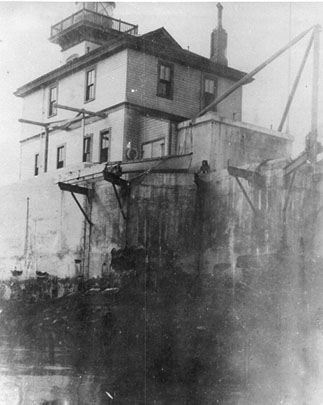
- Lincoln Rock Light
- Location: Lincoln Rock; Clarence Strait; Alaska; United States
- Coordinates: 56.056766°N 132.697464°W

Tower
- Constructed: 1903 (first); 1944 (second)
- Foundation: concrete base
- Construction: metal skeletal tower (current) wooden tower (first)
- Automated: 1968
- Height: 30 feet (9.1 m) (current)
- Shape: square pyramidal tower (current) square tower on roof a 2-storey keeper's house (first)
- Power source: solar power
- Operator: United States Coast Guard

Light
- First lit: 1968 (current) located on Lincoln Island
- Deactivated: 1968 (second)
- Focal height: 58 feet (18 m) (current)
- Lens: Fourth-order Fresnel lens
- Characteristic: Fl W 6s.

The Lincoln Rock Lighthouse was a lighthouse located on Lincoln Island, a small islet in Clarence Strait in southeastern Alaska, United States. It lay just off the west coast of Etolin Island, between it and Prince of Wales Island.

== History ==
The original lighthouse was built in 1903 and was abandoned in 1909 after being damaged by a storm. In 1911 a manned fog signal station was built on Lincoln Island about 440 yards from the rock, and in 1944 a skeletal light tower was added. The lighthouse was deactivated in 1968. The lighthouse was later demolished and only the foundation of the buildings remain.

== See also ==
- List of lighthouses in the United States
