= SS Malmö =

A number of steamships have carried the name Malmö

- SS Malmö (1838), built by Motala Mekaniska verkstad, Karlshamn
- SS Malmö (1900), built by Kockums, Malmö
- SS Malmö (1914), built by Kjöbenhavns Flydk & Skbs, Copenhagen
- SS Malmö (1918), built by H C Stülcken Sohn, Hamburg
