= SS Scotiadoc =

Great Lakes freighter

Coordinates: 48.266667°N 88.9°W

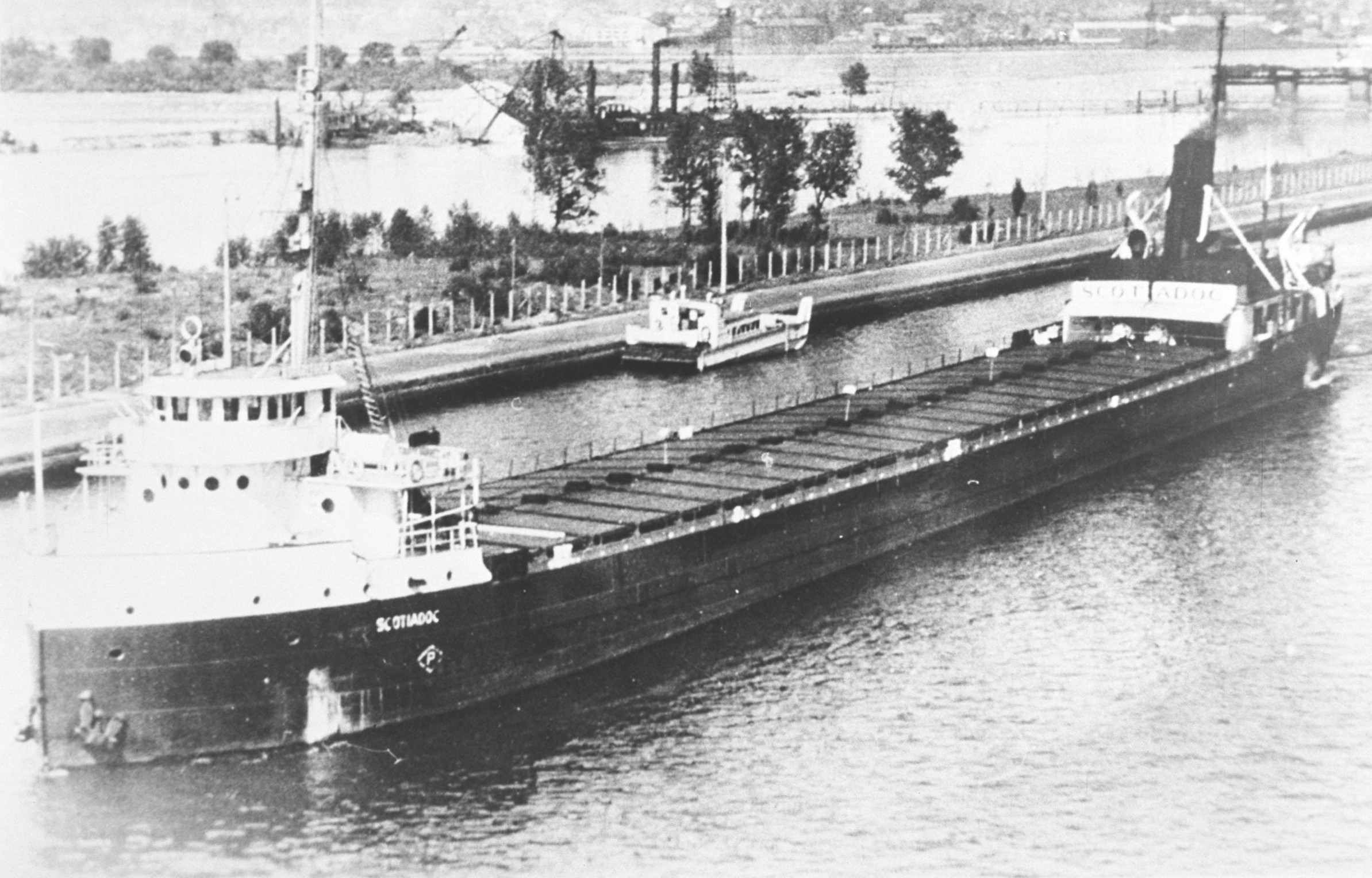
- The Scotiadoc near Humberstone, Ontario. Sometime in 1952.

History
- Name: Martin Mullen (1904–1947); Scotiadoc (1947–1953)
- Owner: Lakewood Steamship Co. (1904–1905); Pioneer Steam Ship Co. (1905–1947); Paterson Steamships, Ltd. (1947–1953)
- Port of registry: Canada
- Builder: American Ship Building Co., Cleveland, Ohio
- Yard number: 422
- Launched: May 14, 1904
- Identification: US 201025; Canadian Registry 173186
- Fate: Rammed by freighter Burlington in heavy fog on June 20, 1953

General characteristics
- Class & type: Lake freighter
- Tonnage: 4432 tons
- Length: 424 ft (129 m)
- Beam: 48 ft (15 m)
- Depth: 23.75 ft (7.24 m)
- Crew: 29

SS Scotiadoc was a Great Lakes freighter primarily designed for the iron ore, coal, and grain trades on the Great Lakes. She was commissioned by the Lakewood Steamship Co. of Cleveland, Ohio and launched as SS Martin Mullen.

== Career ==
Martin Mullen made frequent trips to and from Duluth-area ports. In 1947 she was purchased by Paterson Steamships and renamed Scotiadoc in 1948.

== Final voyage ==
Scotiadoc was rammed by Canadian steamer Burlington in heavy fog on June 20, 1953, off Trowbridge Island, near the Sleeping Giant in Lake Superior. One crew member died. Captain George Edgar Morris testified that he picked up Burlington on radar when she was 5 nautical miles (9.3 km; 5.8 mi) away. Burlington collided with the starboard side of Scotiadoc near the stern.

== Discovery of shipwreck ==
Shipwreck hunters found the wreck in 2013. At a depth of 850 feet (259 m), it is the deepest shipwreck in the Great Lakes.
