= MV Ulysses (1941) =

Coastal trading vessel

History
- Name: Empire Creek (1941–46); Springcreek (1946–48); Goldcreek (1948–51); Milborne (1951–64); Georgios (1964–78); Ulysses (1978–79)
- Owner: Ministry of War Transport (1941–46); Efford Shipping Co Ltd (1946–48); E J & W Goldsmith Ltd (1948–51); John Carter (Poole) Ltd (1951–64); S Skordalakis (1964–72); Markesenis, Daglas & Aktipis (1972–78); Zoegeorge SA (1978–79)
- Operator: General Steam Navigation Co Ltd (1941–46); Springwell Shipping Co Ltd (1946–48); E J & W Goldsmith Ltd (1948–51); John Carter (Poole) Ltd (1951–64); S Skordalakis (1964–72); Markesenis, Daglas & Aktipis (1972–78); Zoegeorge SA (1978–79)
- Port of registry: (United Kingdom) London (1941–51); (United Kingdom) Poole (1951–64); (Greece) Piraeus (1964–78); Panama City (1978–79)
- Builder: J Pollock & Sons Ltd
- Yard number: 1776
- Launched: 15 January 1941
- Completed: April 1941
- In service: June 1941
- Out of service: 20 December 1979
- Identification: United Kingdom Official Number 168087 (1941–64); Code Letters MNZP (1941–64)
- Fate: Wrecked

General characteristics
- Tonnage: 332 GRT; 153 NRT
- Length: 130 ft 2 in (39.67 m)
- Beam: 25 ft 2 in (7.67 m)
- Draught: 9 ft 10 in (3.00 m)
- Depth: 9 ft 0 in (2.74 m)
- Propulsion: Two SCSA Diesel engines
- Speed: 8 knots (15 km/h)

Ulysses was a 332 GRT coastal trading vessel that was built in 1941 as Empire Creek by J Pollock & Sons, Faversham, United Kingdom. She was built for the Ministry of War Transport (MoWT). Empire Creek survived being bombed shortly after entering service. In 1946, she was sold into merchant service and renamed Springcreek. Further sales in 1948 and 1951 saw her named Goldcreek and Milborne respectively. In 1964, she was sold to Greece and renamed Georgios. In 1978, she was sold to Panama and renamed Ulysses, serving until she ran aground near Naples, Italy in 1979 and was wrecked.

== Description ==
The ship was built in 1941 by J Pollock & Sons Ltd, Faversham, Kent. Yard number 1776, she was launched on 15 January and completed in April.

The ship was 130 feet 2 inches (39.67 m) long, with a beam of 25 feet 2 inches (7.67 m). She had a depth of 9 feet 0 inches (2.74 m) and a draught of 9 feet 10 inches (3.00 m). She was assessed at 322 GRT, 153 NRT.

The ship was propelled by 116 nhp 2-stroke Single Cycle Single Action diesel engine, which had six cylinders of 10 1/2 inches (27 cm) diameter by 13 1/2 inches (34 cm) stroke, driving a single screw propeller. The engine was built by Crossley Bros, Manchester, Lancashire. It could propel her at 8 knots (15 km/h)

== History ==
Empire Creek was built for the MoWT. She was placed under the management of the General Steam Navigation Co Ltd. The Official Number 168087 was allocated. Her port of registry was London and the Code Letters MNZP were allocated. She spent the war years sailing around the coast of the United Kingdom and making some cross-Channel voyages to France. Amongst the convoys Empire Creek was a member of was Convoy WN 139, which departed Oban, Argyllshire on 10 June 1941 and arrived at Methil, Fife on 14 June. On 13 June 1941, Empire Creek was bombed off Peterhead, Aberdeenshire. After arrival at Methil, she was towed to Aberdeen. Repairs took until September to complete.

In 1946, Empire Creek was sold to the Efford Shipping Co Ltd, London. She was placed under the management of the Springwell Shipping Co Ltd, London. In line with Efford's policy of their ship names beginning with the prefix Spring, permission was sought to change her name to Springcreek.

In 1948, she was sold to E J & W Goldsmith Ltd, London and renamed Goldcreek. In 1951, she was sold to J Carter (Poole) Ltd, and renamed Milborne. On 20 March 1953, Milborne was on a voyage from Port Talbot, Glamorgan to Fleetwood, Lancashire when she ran aground off Rhoscolyn Point, Anglesey and her steering gear was damaged. After being refloated by the Holyhead lifeboat, Milborne drifted for seven hours before she was taken in tow by Empire Punch, and taken to Holyhead. There were fears that her cargo of carbide would explode if it came into contact with the water which was entering Milborne's engine room through her damaged plates. Pumps were brought from Liverpool, Lancashire and the crews from both ships spent a night pumping her out. In 1964, she was sold to S Skordalakis, Piraeus, Greece and renamed Georgios. In 1972, she was sold to Messrs. Markesinis, Daglas and Aktipis, Piraeus. In 1978, she was sold to Zoegeorge SA, Panama and renamed Ulysses. On 20 December 1979, Ulysses ran aground off Naples, Italy and was wrecked.
