= List of United States INCITS codes by county =

The following sortable table lists the 3244 counties and county equivalents of the United States and their respective INCITS (38+31) codes. (Formerly FIPS county codes).

== Table ==
INCITS	County or equivalent	State or equivalent
01001	Autauga County	Alabama
01003	Baldwin County	Alabama
01005	Barbour County	Alabama
01007	Bibb County	Alabama
01009	Blount County	Alabama
01011	Bullock County	Alabama
01013	Butler County	Alabama
01015	Calhoun County	Alabama
01017	Chambers County	Alabama
01019	Cherokee County	Alabama
01021	Chilton County	Alabama
01023	Choctaw County	Alabama
01025	Clarke County	Alabama
01027	Clay County	Alabama
01029	Cleburne County	Alabama
01031	Coffee County	Alabama
01033	Colbert County	Alabama
01035	Conecuh County	Alabama
01037	Coosa County	Alabama
01039	Covington County	Alabama
01041	Crenshaw County	Alabama
01043	Cullman County	Alabama
01045	Dale County	Alabama
01047	Dallas County	Alabama
01049	DeKalb County	Alabama
01051	Elmore County	Alabama
01053	Escambia County	Alabama
01055	Etowah County	Alabama
01057	Fayette County	Alabama
01059	Franklin County	Alabama
01061	Geneva County	Alabama
01063	Greene County	Alabama
01065	Hale County	Alabama
01067	Henry County	Alabama
01069	Houston County	Alabama
01071	Jackson County	Alabama
01073	Jefferson County	Alabama
01075	Lamar County	Alabama
01077	Lauderdale County	Alabama
01079	Lawrence County	Alabama
01081	Lee County	Alabama
01083	Limestone County	Alabama
01085	Lowndes County	Alabama
01087	Macon County	Alabama
01089	Madison County	Alabama
01091	Marengo County	Alabama
01093	Marion County	Alabama
01095	Marshall County	Alabama
01097	Mobile County	Alabama
01099	Monroe County	Alabama
01101	Montgomery County	Alabama
01103	Morgan County	Alabama
01105	Perry County	Alabama
01107	Pickens County	Alabama
01109	Pike County	Alabama
01111	Randolph County	Alabama
01113	Russell County	Alabama
01115	St. Clair County	Alabama
01117	Shelby County	Alabama
01119	Sumter County	Alabama
01121	Talladega County	Alabama
01123	Tallapoosa County	Alabama
01125	Tuscaloosa County	Alabama
01127	Walker County	Alabama
01129	Washington County	Alabama
01131	Wilcox County	Alabama
01133	Winston County	Alabama
02013	Aleutians East Borough (Note: One of the 19 organized boroughs of Alaska.)	Alaska
02016	Aleutians West Census Area (Note: One of the 10 census areas of the Unorganized Borough of Alaska.)	Alaska
02020	Anchorage, Municipality of (Note: The Municipality of Anchorage, Alaska has a fully consolidated city and borough government.)	Alaska
02050	Bethel Census Area	Alaska
02060	Bristol Bay Borough	Alaska
02063	Chugach Census Area	Alaska
02066	Copper River Census Area	Alaska
02068	Denali Borough	Alaska
02070	Dillingham Census Area	Alaska
02090	Fairbanks North Star Borough	Alaska
02100	Haines Borough	Alaska
02105	Hoonah–Angoon Census Area	Alaska
02110	Juneau, City and Borough of (Note: The City and Borough of Juneau, Alaska has a fully consolidated city and borough government.)	Alaska
02122	Kenai Peninsula Borough	Alaska
02130	Ketchikan Gateway Borough	Alaska
02150	Kodiak Island Borough	Alaska
02158	Kusilvak Census Area	Alaska
02164	Lake and Peninsula Borough	Alaska
02170	Matanuska-Susitna Borough	Alaska
02180	Nome Census Area	Alaska
02185	North Slope Borough	Alaska
02188	Northwest Arctic Borough	Alaska
02195	Petersburg Borough (Note: Established in 2013, Petersburg Borough is the most recently created county equivalent in the United States. The most recently created county is Broomfield County, Colorado, in 2001.)	Alaska
02198	Prince of Wales – Hyder Census Area	Alaska
02220	Sitka, City and Borough of (Note: The City and Borough of Sitka, Alaska has a fully consolidated city and borough government.)	Alaska
02230	Skagway, Municipality of	Alaska
02240	Southeast Fairbanks Census Area	Alaska
02275	Wrangell, City and Borough of	Alaska
02282	Yakutat, City and Borough of (Note: The City and Borough of Yakutat, Alaska has a fully consolidated city and borough government.)	Alaska
02290	Yukon–Koyukuk Census Area	Alaska
60010	Eastern District	American Samoa
60020	Manu'a District	American Samoa
60030	Rose Atoll (Rose Island)	American Samoa
60040	Swains Island	American Samoa
60050	Western District	American Samoa
04001	Apache County	Arizona
04003	Cochise County	Arizona
04005	Coconino County	Arizona
04007	Gila County	Arizona
04009	Graham County	Arizona
04011	Greenlee County	Arizona
04012	La Paz County	Arizona
04013	Maricopa County	Arizona
04015	Mohave County	Arizona
04017	Navajo County	Arizona
04019	Pima County	Arizona
04021	Pinal County	Arizona
04023	Santa Cruz County	Arizona
04025	Yavapai County	Arizona
04027	Yuma County	Arizona
05001	Arkansas County	Arkansas
05003	Ashley County	Arkansas
05005	Baxter County	Arkansas
05007	Benton County	Arkansas
05009	Boone County	Arkansas
05011	Bradley County	Arkansas
05013	Calhoun County	Arkansas
05015	Carroll County	Arkansas
05017	Chicot County	Arkansas
05019	Clark County	Arkansas
05021	Clay County	Arkansas
05023	Cleburne County	Arkansas
05025	Cleveland County	Arkansas
05027	Columbia County	Arkansas
05029	Conway County	Arkansas
05031	Craighead County	Arkansas
05033	Crawford County	Arkansas
05035	Crittenden County	Arkansas
05037	Cross County	Arkansas
05039	Dallas County	Arkansas
05041	Desha County	Arkansas
05043	Drew County	Arkansas
05045	Faulkner County	Arkansas
05047	Franklin County	Arkansas
05049	Fulton County	Arkansas
05051	Garland County	Arkansas
05053	Grant County	Arkansas
05055	Greene County	Arkansas
05057	Hempstead County	Arkansas
05059	Hot Spring County	Arkansas
05061	Howard County	Arkansas
05063	Independence County	Arkansas
05065	Izard County	Arkansas
05067	Jackson County	Arkansas
05069	Jefferson County	Arkansas
05071	Johnson County	Arkansas
05073	Lafayette County	Arkansas
05075	Lawrence County	Arkansas
05077	Lee County	Arkansas
05079	Lincoln County	Arkansas
05081	Little River County	Arkansas
05083	Logan County	Arkansas
05085	Lonoke County	Arkansas
05087	Madison County	Arkansas
05089	Marion County	Arkansas
05091	Miller County	Arkansas
05093	Mississippi County	Arkansas
05095	Monroe County	Arkansas
05097	Montgomery County	Arkansas
05099	Nevada County	Arkansas
05101	Newton County	Arkansas
05103	Ouachita County	Arkansas
05105	Perry County	Arkansas
05107	Phillips County	Arkansas
05109	Pike County	Arkansas
05111	Poinsett County	Arkansas
05113	Polk County	Arkansas
05115	Pope County	Arkansas
05117	Prairie County	Arkansas
05119	Pulaski County	Arkansas
05121	Randolph County	Arkansas
05123	St. Francis County	Arkansas
05125	Saline County	Arkansas
05127	Scott County	Arkansas
05129	Searcy County	Arkansas
05131	Sebastian County	Arkansas
05133	Sevier County	Arkansas
05135	Sharp County	Arkansas
05137	Stone County	Arkansas
05139	Union County	Arkansas
05141	Van Buren County	Arkansas
05143	Washington County	Arkansas
05145	White County	Arkansas
05147	Woodruff County	Arkansas
05149	Yell County	Arkansas
06001	Alameda County	California
06003	Alpine County	California
06005	Amador County	California
06007	Butte County	California
06009	Calaveras County	California
06011	Colusa County	California
06013	Contra Costa County	California
06015	Del Norte County	California
06017	El Dorado County	California
06019	Fresno County	California
06021	Glenn County	California
06023	Humboldt County	California
06025	Imperial County	California
06027	Inyo County	California
06029	Kern County	California
06031	Kings County	California
06033	Lake County	California
06035	Lassen County	California
06037	Los Angeles County	California
06039	Madera County	California
06041	Marin County	California
06043	Mariposa County	California
06045	Mendocino County	California
06047	Merced County	California
06049	Modoc County	California
06051	Mono County	California
06053	Monterey County	California
06055	Napa County	California
06057	Nevada County	California
06059	Orange County	California
06061	Placer County	California
06063	Plumas County	California
06065	Riverside County	California
06067	Sacramento County	California
06069	San Benito County	California
06071	San Bernardino County	California
06073	San Diego County	California
06075	San Francisco, City and County of (Note: The City and County of San Francisco, California has a fully consolidated city and county government.)	California
06077	San Joaquin County	California
06079	San Luis Obispo County	California
06081	San Mateo County	California
06083	Santa Barbara County	California
06085	Santa Clara County	California
06087	Santa Cruz County	California
06089	Shasta County	California
06091	Sierra County	California
06093	Siskiyou County	California
06095	Solano County	California
06097	Sonoma County	California
06099	Stanislaus County	California
06101	Sutter County	California
06103	Tehama County	California
06105	Trinity County	California
06107	Tulare County	California
06109	Tuolumne County	California
06111	Ventura County	California
06113	Yolo County	California
06115	Yuba County	California
08001	Adams County	Colorado
08003	Alamosa County	Colorado
08005	Arapahoe County	Colorado
08007	Archuleta County	Colorado
08009	Baca County	Colorado
08011	Bent County	Colorado
08013	Boulder County	Colorado
08014	Broomfield, City and County of (Note: The City and County of Broomfield, Colorado has a fully consolidated city and county government. Established in 2001, Broomfield is the most recently created county in the United States. The most recently created county equivalent is Petersburg Borough, Alaska, in 2013.)	Colorado
08015	Chaffee County	Colorado
08017	Cheyenne County	Colorado
08019	Clear Creek County	Colorado
08021	Conejos County	Colorado
08023	Costilla County	Colorado
08025	Crowley County	Colorado
08027	Custer County	Colorado
08029	Delta County	Colorado
08031	Denver, City and County of (Note: The City and County of Denver, Colorado has a fully consolidated city and county government.)	Colorado
08033	Dolores County	Colorado
08035	Douglas County	Colorado
08037	Eagle County	Colorado
08039	Elbert County	Colorado
08041	El Paso County	Colorado
08043	Fremont County	Colorado
08045	Garfield County	Colorado
08047	Gilpin County	Colorado
08049	Grand County	Colorado
08051	Gunnison County	Colorado
08053	Hinsdale County	Colorado
08055	Huerfano County	Colorado
08057	Jackson County	Colorado
08059	Jefferson County	Colorado
08061	Kiowa County	Colorado
08063	Kit Carson County	Colorado
08065	Lake County	Colorado
08067	La Plata County	Colorado
08069	Larimer County	Colorado
08071	Las Animas County	Colorado
08073	Lincoln County	Colorado
08075	Logan County	Colorado
08077	Mesa County	Colorado
08079	Mineral County	Colorado
08081	Moffat County	Colorado
08083	Montezuma County	Colorado
08085	Montrose County	Colorado
08087	Morgan County	Colorado
08089	Otero County	Colorado
08091	Ouray County	Colorado
08093	Park County	Colorado
08095	Phillips County	Colorado
08097	Pitkin County	Colorado
08099	Prowers County	Colorado
08101	Pueblo County	Colorado
08103	Rio Blanco County	Colorado
08105	Rio Grande County	Colorado
08107	Routt County	Colorado
08109	Saguache County	Colorado
08111	San Juan County	Colorado
08113	San Miguel County	Colorado
08115	Sedgwick County	Colorado
08117	Summit County	Colorado
08119	Teller County	Colorado
08121	Washington County	Colorado
08123	Weld County	Colorado
08125	Yuma County	Colorado
09110	Capitol Planning Region (Note: The United States Census Bureau and other federal agencies recognize the Connecticut planning regions as county equivalents)	Connecticut
09120	Greater Bridgeport Planning Region	Connecticut
09130	Lower Connecticut River Valley Planning Region	Connecticut
09140	Naugatuck Valley Planning Region	Connecticut
09150	Northeastern Connecticut Planning Region	Connecticut
09160	Northwest Hills Planning Region	Connecticut
09170	South Central Connecticut Planning Region	Connecticut
09180	Southeastern Connecticut Planning Region	Connecticut
09190	Western Connecticut Planning Region	Connecticut
10001	Kent County	Delaware
10003	New Castle County	Delaware
10005	Sussex County	Delaware
11001	District of Columbia (Note: The United States Census Bureau and the Office of Management and Budget treat the District of Columbia as a single county equivalent.)	District of Columbia
12001	Alachua County	Florida
12003	Baker County	Florida
12005	Bay County	Florida
12007	Bradford County	Florida
12009	Brevard County	Florida
12011	Broward County	Florida
12013	Calhoun County	Florida
12015	Charlotte County	Florida
12017	Citrus County	Florida
12019	Clay County	Florida
12021	Collier County	Florida
12023	Columbia County	Florida
12027	DeSoto County	Florida
12029	Dixie County	Florida
12031	Duval County	Florida
12033	Escambia County	Florida
12035	Flagler County	Florida
12037	Franklin County	Florida
12039	Gadsden County	Florida
12041	Gilchrist County	Florida
12043	Glades County	Florida
12045	Gulf County	Florida
12047	Hamilton County	Florida
12049	Hardee County	Florida
12051	Hendry County	Florida
12053	Hernando County	Florida
12055	Highlands County	Florida
12057	Hillsborough County	Florida
12059	Holmes County	Florida
12061	Indian River County	Florida
12063	Jackson County	Florida
12065	Jefferson County	Florida
12067	Lafayette County	Florida
12069	Lake County	Florida
12071	Lee County	Florida
12073	Leon County	Florida
12075	Levy County	Florida
12077	Liberty County	Florida
12079	Madison County	Florida
12081	Manatee County	Florida
12083	Marion County	Florida
12085	Martin County	Florida
12086	Miami-Dade County	Florida
12087	Monroe County	Florida
12089	Nassau County	Florida
12091	Okaloosa County	Florida
12093	Okeechobee County	Florida
12095	Orange County	Florida
12097	Osceola County	Florida
12099	Palm Beach County	Florida
12101	Pasco County	Florida
12103	Pinellas County	Florida
12105	Polk County	Florida
12107	Putnam County	Florida
12109	St. Johns County	Florida
12111	St. Lucie County	Florida
12113	Santa Rosa County	Florida
12115	Sarasota County	Florida
12117	Seminole County	Florida
12119	Sumter County	Florida
12121	Suwannee County	Florida
12123	Taylor County	Florida
12125	Union County	Florida
12127	Volusia County	Florida
12129	Wakulla County	Florida
12131	Walton County	Florida
12133	Washington County	Florida
13001	Appling County	(Georgia (U.S. state)) Georgia
13003	Atkinson County	(Georgia (U.S. state)) Georgia
13005	Bacon County	(Georgia (U.S. state)) Georgia
13007	Baker County	(Georgia (U.S. state)) Georgia
13009	Baldwin County	(Georgia (U.S. state)) Georgia
13011	Banks County	(Georgia (U.S. state)) Georgia
13013	Barrow County	(Georgia (U.S. state)) Georgia
13015	Bartow County	(Georgia (U.S. state)) Georgia
13017	Ben Hill County	(Georgia (U.S. state)) Georgia
13019	Berrien County	(Georgia (U.S. state)) Georgia
13021	Bibb County	(Georgia (U.S. state)) Georgia
13023	Bleckley County	(Georgia (U.S. state)) Georgia
13025	Brantley County	(Georgia (U.S. state)) Georgia
13027	Brooks County	(Georgia (U.S. state)) Georgia
13029	Bryan County	(Georgia (U.S. state)) Georgia
13031	Bulloch County	(Georgia (U.S. state)) Georgia
13033	Burke County	(Georgia (U.S. state)) Georgia
13035	Butts County	(Georgia (U.S. state)) Georgia
13037	Calhoun County	(Georgia (U.S. state)) Georgia
13039	Camden County	(Georgia (U.S. state)) Georgia
13043	Candler County	(Georgia (U.S. state)) Georgia
13045	Carroll County	(Georgia (U.S. state)) Georgia
13047	Catoosa County	(Georgia (U.S. state)) Georgia
13049	Charlton County	(Georgia (U.S. state)) Georgia
13051	Chatham County	(Georgia (U.S. state)) Georgia
13053	Chattahoochee County	(Georgia (U.S. state)) Georgia
13055	Chattooga County	(Georgia (U.S. state)) Georgia
13057	Cherokee County	(Georgia (U.S. state)) Georgia
13059	Clarke County	(Georgia (U.S. state)) Georgia
13061	Clay County	(Georgia (U.S. state)) Georgia
13063	Clayton County	(Georgia (U.S. state)) Georgia
13065	Clinch County	(Georgia (U.S. state)) Georgia
13067	Cobb County	(Georgia (U.S. state)) Georgia
13069	Coffee County	(Georgia (U.S. state)) Georgia
13071	Colquitt County	(Georgia (U.S. state)) Georgia
13073	Columbia County	(Georgia (U.S. state)) Georgia
13075	Cook County	(Georgia (U.S. state)) Georgia
13077	Coweta County	(Georgia (U.S. state)) Georgia
13079	Crawford County	(Georgia (U.S. state)) Georgia
13081	Crisp County	(Georgia (U.S. state)) Georgia
13083	Dade County	(Georgia (U.S. state)) Georgia
13085	Dawson County	(Georgia (U.S. state)) Georgia
13087	Decatur County	(Georgia (U.S. state)) Georgia
13089	DeKalb County	(Georgia (U.S. state)) Georgia
13091	Dodge County	(Georgia (U.S. state)) Georgia
13093	Dooly County	(Georgia (U.S. state)) Georgia
13095	Dougherty County	(Georgia (U.S. state)) Georgia
13097	Douglas County	(Georgia (U.S. state)) Georgia
13099	Early County	(Georgia (U.S. state)) Georgia
13101	Echols County	(Georgia (U.S. state)) Georgia
13103	Effingham County	(Georgia (U.S. state)) Georgia
13105	Elbert County	(Georgia (U.S. state)) Georgia
13107	Emanuel County	(Georgia (U.S. state)) Georgia
13109	Evans County	(Georgia (U.S. state)) Georgia
13111	Fannin County	(Georgia (U.S. state)) Georgia
13113	Fayette County	(Georgia (U.S. state)) Georgia
13115	Floyd County	(Georgia (U.S. state)) Georgia
13117	Forsyth County	(Georgia (U.S. state)) Georgia
13119	Franklin County	(Georgia (U.S. state)) Georgia
13121	Fulton County	(Georgia (U.S. state)) Georgia
13123	Gilmer County	(Georgia (U.S. state)) Georgia
13125	Glascock County	(Georgia (U.S. state)) Georgia
13127	Glynn County	(Georgia (U.S. state)) Georgia
13129	Gordon County	(Georgia (U.S. state)) Georgia
13131	Grady County	(Georgia (U.S. state)) Georgia
13133	Greene County	(Georgia (U.S. state)) Georgia
13135	Gwinnett County	(Georgia (U.S. state)) Georgia
13137	Habersham County	(Georgia (U.S. state)) Georgia
13139	Hall County	(Georgia (U.S. state)) Georgia
13141	Hancock County	(Georgia (U.S. state)) Georgia
13143	Haralson County	(Georgia (U.S. state)) Georgia
13145	Harris County	(Georgia (U.S. state)) Georgia
13147	Hart County	(Georgia (U.S. state)) Georgia
13149	Heard County	(Georgia (U.S. state)) Georgia
13151	Henry County	(Georgia (U.S. state)) Georgia
13153	Houston County	(Georgia (U.S. state)) Georgia
13155	Irwin County	(Georgia (U.S. state)) Georgia
13157	Jackson County	(Georgia (U.S. state)) Georgia
13159	Jasper County	(Georgia (U.S. state)) Georgia
13161	Jeff Davis County	(Georgia (U.S. state)) Georgia
13163	Jefferson County	(Georgia (U.S. state)) Georgia
13165	Jenkins County	(Georgia (U.S. state)) Georgia
13167	Johnson County	(Georgia (U.S. state)) Georgia
13169	Jones County	(Georgia (U.S. state)) Georgia
13171	Lamar County	(Georgia (U.S. state)) Georgia
13173	Lanier County	(Georgia (U.S. state)) Georgia
13175	Laurens County	(Georgia (U.S. state)) Georgia
13177	Lee County	(Georgia (U.S. state)) Georgia
13179	Liberty County	(Georgia (U.S. state)) Georgia
13181	Lincoln County	(Georgia (U.S. state)) Georgia
13183	Long County	(Georgia (U.S. state)) Georgia
13185	Lowndes County	(Georgia (U.S. state)) Georgia
13187	Lumpkin County	(Georgia (U.S. state)) Georgia
13189	McDuffie County	(Georgia (U.S. state)) Georgia
13191	McIntosh County	(Georgia (U.S. state)) Georgia
13193	Macon County	(Georgia (U.S. state)) Georgia
13195	Madison County	(Georgia (U.S. state)) Georgia
13197	Marion County	(Georgia (U.S. state)) Georgia
13199	Meriwether County	(Georgia (U.S. state)) Georgia
13201	Miller County	(Georgia (U.S. state)) Georgia
13205	Mitchell County	(Georgia (U.S. state)) Georgia
13207	Monroe County	(Georgia (U.S. state)) Georgia
13209	Montgomery County	(Georgia (U.S. state)) Georgia
13211	Morgan County	(Georgia (U.S. state)) Georgia
13213	Murray County	(Georgia (U.S. state)) Georgia
13215	Muscogee County	(Georgia (U.S. state)) Georgia
13217	Newton County	(Georgia (U.S. state)) Georgia
13219	Oconee County	(Georgia (U.S. state)) Georgia
13221	Oglethorpe County	(Georgia (U.S. state)) Georgia
13223	Paulding County	(Georgia (U.S. state)) Georgia
13225	Peach County	(Georgia (U.S. state)) Georgia
13227	Pickens County	(Georgia (U.S. state)) Georgia
13229	Pierce County	(Georgia (U.S. state)) Georgia
13231	Pike County	(Georgia (U.S. state)) Georgia
13233	Polk County	(Georgia (U.S. state)) Georgia
13235	Pulaski County	(Georgia (U.S. state)) Georgia
13237	Putnam County	(Georgia (U.S. state)) Georgia
13239	Quitman County	(Georgia (U.S. state)) Georgia
13241	Rabun County	(Georgia (U.S. state)) Georgia
13243	Randolph County	(Georgia (U.S. state)) Georgia
13245	Richmond County	(Georgia (U.S. state)) Georgia
13247	Rockdale County	(Georgia (U.S. state)) Georgia
13249	Schley County	(Georgia (U.S. state)) Georgia
13251	Screven County	(Georgia (U.S. state)) Georgia
13253	Seminole County	(Georgia (U.S. state)) Georgia
13255	Spalding County	(Georgia (U.S. state)) Georgia
13257	Stephens County	(Georgia (U.S. state)) Georgia
13259	Stewart County	(Georgia (U.S. state)) Georgia
13261	Sumter County	(Georgia (U.S. state)) Georgia
13263	Talbot County	(Georgia (U.S. state)) Georgia
13265	Taliaferro County	(Georgia (U.S. state)) Georgia
13267	Tattnall County	(Georgia (U.S. state)) Georgia
13269	Taylor County	(Georgia (U.S. state)) Georgia
13271	Telfair County	(Georgia (U.S. state)) Georgia
13273	Terrell County	(Georgia (U.S. state)) Georgia
13275	Thomas County	(Georgia (U.S. state)) Georgia
13277	Tift County	(Georgia (U.S. state)) Georgia
13279	Toombs County	(Georgia (U.S. state)) Georgia
13281	Towns County	(Georgia (U.S. state)) Georgia
13283	Treutlen County	(Georgia (U.S. state)) Georgia
13285	Troup County	(Georgia (U.S. state)) Georgia
13287	Turner County	(Georgia (U.S. state)) Georgia
13289	Twiggs County	(Georgia (U.S. state)) Georgia
13291	Union County	(Georgia (U.S. state)) Georgia
13293	Upson County	(Georgia (U.S. state)) Georgia
13295	Walker County	(Georgia (U.S. state)) Georgia
13297	Walton County	(Georgia (U.S. state)) Georgia
13299	Ware County	(Georgia (U.S. state)) Georgia
13301	Warren County	(Georgia (U.S. state)) Georgia
13303	Washington County	(Georgia (U.S. state)) Georgia
13305	Wayne County	(Georgia (U.S. state)) Georgia
13307	Webster County	(Georgia (U.S. state)) Georgia
13309	Wheeler County	(Georgia (U.S. state)) Georgia
13311	White County	(Georgia (U.S. state)) Georgia
13313	Whitfield County	(Georgia (U.S. state)) Georgia
13315	Wilcox County	(Georgia (U.S. state)) Georgia
13317	Wilkes County	(Georgia (U.S. state)) Georgia
13319	Wilkinson County	(Georgia (U.S. state)) Georgia
13321	Worth County	(Georgia (U.S. state)) Georgia
66010	Guam	Guam
15001	Hawaii County	(Hawaii) Hawaiʻi
15003	Honolulu, City and County of (Note: The City and County of Honolulu, Hawaii has a county government with municipal functions.)	(Hawaii) Hawaiʻi
15005	Kalawao County	(Hawaii) Hawaiʻi
15007	Kauaʻi County	(Hawaii) Hawaiʻi
15009	Maui County	(Hawaii) Hawaiʻi
16001	Ada County	Idaho
16003	Adams County	Idaho
16005	Bannock County	Idaho
16007	Bear Lake County	Idaho
16009	Benewah County	Idaho
16011	Bingham County	Idaho
16013	Blaine County	Idaho
16015	Boise County	Idaho
16017	Bonner County	Idaho
16019	Bonneville County	Idaho
16021	Boundary County	Idaho
16023	Butte County	Idaho
16025	Camas County	Idaho
16027	Canyon County	Idaho
16029	Caribou County	Idaho
16031	Cassia County	Idaho
16033	Clark County	Idaho
16035	Clearwater County	Idaho
16037	Custer County	Idaho
16039	Elmore County	Idaho
16041	Franklin County	Idaho
16043	Fremont County	Idaho
16045	Gem County	Idaho
16047	Gooding County	Idaho
16049	Idaho County	Idaho
16051	Jefferson County	Idaho
16053	Jerome County	Idaho
16055	Kootenai County	Idaho
16057	Latah County	Idaho
16059	Lemhi County	Idaho
16061	Lewis County	Idaho
16063	Lincoln County	Idaho
16065	Madison County	Idaho
16067	Minidoka County	Idaho
16069	Nez Perce County	Idaho
16071	Oneida County	Idaho
16073	Owyhee County	Idaho
16075	Payette County	Idaho
16077	Power County	Idaho
16079	Shoshone County	Idaho
16081	Teton County	Idaho
16083	Twin Falls County	Idaho
16085	Valley County	Idaho
16087	Washington County	Idaho
17001	Adams County	Illinois
17003	Alexander County	Illinois
17005	Bond County	Illinois
17007	Boone County	Illinois
17009	Brown County	Illinois
17011	Bureau County	Illinois
17013	Calhoun County	Illinois
17015	Carroll County	Illinois
17017	Cass County	Illinois
17019	Champaign County	Illinois
17021	Christian County	Illinois
17023	Clark County	Illinois
17025	Clay County	Illinois
17027	Clinton County	Illinois
17029	Coles County	Illinois
17031	Cook County	Illinois
17033	Crawford County	Illinois
17035	Cumberland County	Illinois
17037	DeKalb County	Illinois
17039	De Witt County	Illinois
17041	Douglas County	Illinois
17043	DuPage County	Illinois
17045	Edgar County	Illinois
17047	Edwards County	Illinois
17049	Effingham County	Illinois
17051	Fayette County	Illinois
17053	Ford County	Illinois
17055	Franklin County	Illinois
17057	Fulton County	Illinois
17059	Gallatin County	Illinois
17061	Greene County	Illinois
17063	Grundy County	Illinois
17065	Hamilton County	Illinois
17067	Hancock County	Illinois
17069	Hardin County	Illinois
17071	Henderson County	Illinois
17073	Henry County	Illinois
17075	Iroquois County	Illinois
17077	Jackson County	Illinois
17079	Jasper County	Illinois
17081	Jefferson County	Illinois
17083	Jersey County	Illinois
17085	Jo Daviess County	Illinois
17087	Johnson County	Illinois
17089	Kane County	Illinois
17091	Kankakee County	Illinois
17093	Kendall County	Illinois
17095	Knox County	Illinois
17097	Lake County	Illinois
17099	LaSalle County	Illinois
17101	Lawrence County	Illinois
17103	Lee County	Illinois
17105	Livingston County	Illinois
17107	Logan County	Illinois
17109	McDonough County	Illinois
17111	McHenry County	Illinois
17113	McLean County	Illinois
17115	Macon County	Illinois
17117	Macoupin County	Illinois
17119	Madison County	Illinois
17121	Marion County	Illinois
17123	Marshall County	Illinois
17125	Mason County	Illinois
17127	Massac County	Illinois
17129	Menard County	Illinois
17131	Mercer County	Illinois
17133	Monroe County	Illinois
17135	Montgomery County	Illinois
17137	Morgan County	Illinois
17139	Moultrie County	Illinois
17141	Ogle County	Illinois
17143	Peoria County	Illinois
17145	Perry County	Illinois
17147	Piatt County	Illinois
17149	Pike County	Illinois
17151	Pope County	Illinois
17153	Pulaski County	Illinois
17155	Putnam County	Illinois
17157	Randolph County	Illinois
17159	Richland County	Illinois
17161	Rock Island County	Illinois
17163	St. Clair County	Illinois
17165	Saline County	Illinois
17167	Sangamon County	Illinois
17169	Schuyler County	Illinois
17171	Scott County	Illinois
17173	Shelby County	Illinois
17175	Stark County	Illinois
17177	Stephenson County	Illinois
17179	Tazewell County	Illinois
17181	Union County	Illinois
17183	Vermilion County	Illinois
17185	Wabash County	Illinois
17187	Warren County	Illinois
17189	Washington County	Illinois
17191	Wayne County	Illinois
17193	White County	Illinois
17195	Whiteside County	Illinois
17197	Will County	Illinois
17199	Williamson County	Illinois
17201	Winnebago County	Illinois
17203	Woodford County	Illinois
18001	Adams County	Indiana
18003	Allen County	Indiana
18005	Bartholomew County	Indiana
18007	Benton County	Indiana
18009	Blackford County	Indiana
18011	Boone County	Indiana
18013	Brown County	Indiana
18015	Carroll County	Indiana
18017	Cass County	Indiana
18019	Clark County	Indiana
18021	Clay County	Indiana
18023	Clinton County	Indiana
18025	Crawford County	Indiana
18027	Daviess County	Indiana
18029	Dearborn County	Indiana
18031	Decatur County	Indiana
18033	DeKalb County	Indiana
18035	Delaware County	Indiana
18037	Dubois County	Indiana
18039	Elkhart County	Indiana
18041	Fayette County	Indiana
18043	Floyd County	Indiana
18045	Fountain County	Indiana
18047	Franklin County	Indiana
18049	Fulton County	Indiana
18051	Gibson County	Indiana
18053	Grant County	Indiana
18055	Greene County	Indiana
18057	Hamilton County	Indiana
18059	Hancock County	Indiana
18061	Harrison County	Indiana
18063	Hendricks County	Indiana
18065	Henry County	Indiana
18067	Howard County	Indiana
18069	Huntington County	Indiana
18071	Jackson County	Indiana
18073	Jasper County	Indiana
18075	Jay County	Indiana
18077	Jefferson County	Indiana
18079	Jennings County	Indiana
18081	Johnson County	Indiana
18083	Knox County	Indiana
18085	Kosciusko County	Indiana
18087	LaGrange County	Indiana
18089	Lake County	Indiana
18091	LaPorte County	Indiana
18093	Lawrence County	Indiana
18095	Madison County	Indiana
18097	Marion County	Indiana
18099	Marshall County	Indiana
18101	Martin County	Indiana
18103	Miami County	Indiana
18105	Monroe County	Indiana
18107	Montgomery County	Indiana
18109	Morgan County	Indiana
18111	Newton County	Indiana
18113	Noble County	Indiana
18115	Ohio County	Indiana
18117	Orange County	Indiana
18119	Owen County	Indiana
18121	Parke County	Indiana
18123	Perry County	Indiana
18125	Pike County	Indiana
18127	Porter County	Indiana
18129	Posey County	Indiana
18131	Pulaski County	Indiana
18133	Putnam County	Indiana
18135	Randolph County	Indiana
18137	Ripley County	Indiana
18139	Rush County	Indiana
18141	St. Joseph County	Indiana
18143	Scott County	Indiana
18145	Shelby County	Indiana
18147	Spencer County	Indiana
18149	Starke County	Indiana
18151	Steuben County	Indiana
18153	Sullivan County	Indiana
18155	Switzerland County	Indiana
18157	Tippecanoe County	Indiana
18159	Tipton County	Indiana
18161	Union County	Indiana
18163	Vanderburgh County	Indiana
18165	Vermillion County	Indiana
18167	Vigo County	Indiana
18169	Wabash County	Indiana
18171	Warren County	Indiana
18173	Warrick County	Indiana
18175	Washington County	Indiana
18177	Wayne County	Indiana
18179	Wells County	Indiana
18181	White County	Indiana
18183	Whitley County	Indiana
19001	Adair County	Iowa
19003	Adams County	Iowa
19005	Allamakee County	Iowa
19007	Appanoose County	Iowa
19009	Audubon County	Iowa
19011	Benton County	Iowa
19013	Black Hawk County	Iowa
19015	Boone County	Iowa
19017	Bremer County	Iowa
19019	Buchanan County	Iowa
19021	Buena Vista County	Iowa
19023	Butler County	Iowa
19025	Calhoun County	Iowa
19027	Carroll County	Iowa
19029	Cass County	Iowa
19031	Cedar County	Iowa
19033	Cerro Gordo County	Iowa
19035	Cherokee County	Iowa
19037	Chickasaw County	Iowa
19039	Clarke County	Iowa
19041	Clay County	Iowa
19043	Clayton County	Iowa
19045	Clinton County	Iowa
19047	Crawford County	Iowa
19049	Dallas County	Iowa
19051	Davis County	Iowa
19053	Decatur County	Iowa
19055	Delaware County	Iowa
19057	Des Moines County	Iowa
19059	Dickinson County	Iowa
19061	Dubuque County	Iowa
19063	Emmet County	Iowa
19065	Fayette County	Iowa
19067	Floyd County	Iowa
19069	Franklin County	Iowa
19071	Fremont County	Iowa
19073	Greene County	Iowa
19075	Grundy County	Iowa
19077	Guthrie County	Iowa
19079	Hamilton County	Iowa
19081	Hancock County	Iowa
19083	Hardin County	Iowa
19085	Harrison County	Iowa
19087	Henry County	Iowa
19089	Howard County	Iowa
19091	Humboldt County	Iowa
19093	Ida County	Iowa
19095	Iowa County	Iowa
19097	Jackson County	Iowa
19099	Jasper County	Iowa
19101	Jefferson County	Iowa
19103	Johnson County	Iowa
19105	Jones County	Iowa
19107	Keokuk County	Iowa
19109	Kossuth County	Iowa
19111	Lee County	Iowa
19113	Linn County	Iowa
19115	Louisa County	Iowa
19117	Lucas County	Iowa
19119	Lyon County	Iowa
19121	Madison County	Iowa
19123	Mahaska County	Iowa
19125	Marion County	Iowa
19127	Marshall County	Iowa
19129	Mills County	Iowa
19131	Mitchell County	Iowa
19133	Monona County	Iowa
19135	Monroe County	Iowa
19137	Montgomery County	Iowa
19139	Muscatine County	Iowa
19141	O'Brien County	Iowa
19143	Osceola County	Iowa
19145	Page County	Iowa
19147	Palo Alto County	Iowa
19149	Plymouth County	Iowa
19151	Pocahontas County	Iowa
19153	Polk County	Iowa
19155	Pottawattamie County	Iowa
19157	Poweshiek County	Iowa
19159	Ringgold County	Iowa
19161	Sac County	Iowa
19163	Scott County	Iowa
19165	Shelby County	Iowa
19167	Sioux County	Iowa
19169	Story County	Iowa
19171	Tama County	Iowa
19173	Taylor County	Iowa
19175	Union County	Iowa
19177	Van Buren County	Iowa
19179	Wapello County	Iowa
19181	Warren County	Iowa
19183	Washington County	Iowa
19185	Wayne County	Iowa
19187	Webster County	Iowa
19189	Winnebago County	Iowa
19191	Winneshiek County	Iowa
19193	Woodbury County	Iowa
19195	Worth County	Iowa
19197	Wright County	Iowa
20001	Allen County	Kansas
20003	Anderson County	Kansas
20005	Atchison County	Kansas
20007	Barber County	Kansas
20009	Barton County	Kansas
20011	Bourbon County	Kansas
20013	Brown County	Kansas
20015	Butler County	Kansas
20017	Chase County	Kansas
20019	Chautauqua County	Kansas
20021	Cherokee County	Kansas
20023	Cheyenne County	Kansas
20025	Clark County	Kansas
20027	Clay County	Kansas
20029	Cloud County	Kansas
20031	Coffey County	Kansas
20033	Comanche County	Kansas
20035	Cowley County	Kansas
20037	Crawford County	Kansas
20039	Decatur County	Kansas
20041	Dickinson County	Kansas
20043	Doniphan County	Kansas
20045	Douglas County	Kansas
20047	Edwards County	Kansas
20049	Elk County	Kansas
20051	Ellis County	Kansas
20053	Ellsworth County	Kansas
20055	Finney County	Kansas
20057	Ford County	Kansas
20059	Franklin County	Kansas
20061	Geary County	Kansas
20063	Gove County	Kansas
20065	Graham County	Kansas
20067	Grant County	Kansas
20069	Gray County	Kansas
20071	Greeley County	Kansas
20073	Greenwood County	Kansas
20075	Hamilton County	Kansas
20077	Harper County	Kansas
20079	Harvey County	Kansas
20081	Haskell County	Kansas
20083	Hodgeman County	Kansas
20085	Jackson County	Kansas
20087	Jefferson County	Kansas
20089	Jewell County	Kansas
20091	Johnson County	Kansas
20093	Kearny County	Kansas
20095	Kingman County	Kansas
20097	Kiowa County	Kansas
20099	Labette County	Kansas
20101	Lane County	Kansas
20103	Leavenworth County	Kansas
20105	Lincoln County	Kansas
20107	Linn County	Kansas
20109	Logan County	Kansas
20111	Lyon County	Kansas
20113	McPherson County	Kansas
20115	Marion County	Kansas
20117	Marshall County	Kansas
20119	Meade County	Kansas
20121	Miami County	Kansas
20123	Mitchell County	Kansas
20125	Montgomery County	Kansas
20127	Morris County	Kansas
20129	Morton County	Kansas
20131	Nemaha County	Kansas
20133	Neosho County	Kansas
20135	Ness County	Kansas
20137	Norton County	Kansas
20139	Osage County	Kansas
20141	Osborne County	Kansas
20143	Ottawa County	Kansas
20145	Pawnee County	Kansas
20147	Phillips County	Kansas
20149	Pottawatomie County	Kansas
20151	Pratt County	Kansas
20153	Rawlins County	Kansas
20155	Reno County	Kansas
20157	Republic County	Kansas
20159	Rice County	Kansas
20161	Riley County	Kansas
20163	Rooks County	Kansas
20165	Rush County	Kansas
20167	Russell County	Kansas
20169	Saline County	Kansas
20171	Scott County	Kansas
20173	Sedgwick County	Kansas
20175	Seward County	Kansas
20177	Shawnee County	Kansas
20179	Sheridan County	Kansas
20181	Sherman County	Kansas
20183	Smith County	Kansas
20185	Stafford County	Kansas
20187	Stanton County	Kansas
20189	Stevens County	Kansas
20191	Sumner County	Kansas
20193	Thomas County	Kansas
20195	Trego County	Kansas
20197	Wabaunsee County	Kansas
20199	Wallace County	Kansas
20201	Washington County	Kansas
20203	Wichita County	Kansas
20205	Wilson County	Kansas
20207	Woodson County	Kansas
20209	Wyandotte County	Kansas
21001	Adair County	Kentucky
21003	Allen County	Kentucky
21005	Anderson County	Kentucky
21007	Ballard County	Kentucky
21009	Barren County	Kentucky
21011	Bath County	Kentucky
21013	Bell County	Kentucky
21015	Boone County	Kentucky
21017	Bourbon County	Kentucky
21019	Boyd County	Kentucky
21021	Boyle County	Kentucky
21023	Bracken County	Kentucky
21025	Breathitt County	Kentucky
21027	Breckinridge County	Kentucky
21029	Bullitt County	Kentucky
21031	Butler County	Kentucky
21033	Caldwell County	Kentucky
21035	Calloway County	Kentucky
21037	Campbell County	Kentucky
21039	Carlisle County	Kentucky
21041	Carroll County	Kentucky
21043	Carter County	Kentucky
21045	Casey County	Kentucky
21047	Christian County	Kentucky
21049	Clark County	Kentucky
21051	Clay County	Kentucky
21053	Clinton County	Kentucky
21055	Crittenden County	Kentucky
21057	Cumberland County	Kentucky
21059	Daviess County	Kentucky
21061	Edmonson County	Kentucky
21063	Elliott County	Kentucky
21065	Estill County	Kentucky
21067	Fayette County	Kentucky
21069	Fleming County	Kentucky
21071	Floyd County	Kentucky
21073	Franklin County	Kentucky
21075	Fulton County	Kentucky
21077	Gallatin County	Kentucky
21079	Garrard County	Kentucky
21081	Grant County	Kentucky
21083	Graves County	Kentucky
21085	Grayson County	Kentucky
21087	Green County	Kentucky
21089	Greenup County	Kentucky
21091	Hancock County	Kentucky
21093	Hardin County	Kentucky
21095	Harlan County	Kentucky
21097	Harrison County	Kentucky
21099	Hart County	Kentucky
21101	Henderson County	Kentucky
21103	Henry County	Kentucky
21105	Hickman County	Kentucky
21107	Hopkins County	Kentucky
21109	Jackson County	Kentucky
21111	Jefferson County	Kentucky
21113	Jessamine County	Kentucky
21115	Johnson County	Kentucky
21117	Kenton County	Kentucky
21119	Knott County	Kentucky
21121	Knox County	Kentucky
21123	LaRue County	Kentucky
21125	Laurel County	Kentucky
21127	Lawrence County	Kentucky
21129	Lee County	Kentucky
21131	Leslie County	Kentucky
21133	Letcher County	Kentucky
21135	Lewis County	Kentucky
21137	Lincoln County	Kentucky
21139	Livingston County	Kentucky
21141	Logan County	Kentucky
21143	Lyon County	Kentucky
21145	McCracken County	Kentucky
21147	McCreary County	Kentucky
21149	McLean County	Kentucky
21151	Madison County	Kentucky
21153	Magoffin County	Kentucky
21155	Marion County	Kentucky
21157	Marshall County	Kentucky
21159	Martin County	Kentucky
21161	Mason County	Kentucky
21163	Meade County	Kentucky
21165	Menifee County	Kentucky
21167	Mercer County	Kentucky
21169	Metcalfe County	Kentucky
21171	Monroe County	Kentucky
21173	Montgomery County	Kentucky
21175	Morgan County	Kentucky
21177	Muhlenberg County	Kentucky
21179	Nelson County	Kentucky
21181	Nicholas County	Kentucky
21183	Ohio County	Kentucky
21185	Oldham County	Kentucky
21187	Owen County	Kentucky
21189	Owsley County	Kentucky
21191	Pendleton County	Kentucky
21193	Perry County	Kentucky
21195	Pike County	Kentucky
21197	Powell County	Kentucky
21199	Pulaski County	Kentucky
21201	Robertson County	Kentucky
21203	Rockcastle County	Kentucky
21205	Rowan County	Kentucky
21207	Russell County	Kentucky
21209	Scott County	Kentucky
21211	Shelby County	Kentucky
21213	Simpson County	Kentucky
21215	Spencer County	Kentucky
21217	Taylor County	Kentucky
21219	Todd County	Kentucky
21221	Trigg County	Kentucky
21223	Trimble County	Kentucky
21225	Union County	Kentucky
21227	Warren County	Kentucky
21229	Washington County	Kentucky
21231	Wayne County	Kentucky
21233	Webster County	Kentucky
21235	Whitley County	Kentucky
21237	Wolfe County	Kentucky
21239	Woodford County	Kentucky
22001	Acadia Parish	Louisiana
22003	Allen Parish	Louisiana
22005	Ascension Parish	Louisiana
22007	Assumption Parish	Louisiana
22009	Avoyelles Parish	Louisiana
22011	Beauregard Parish	Louisiana
22013	Bienville Parish	Louisiana
22015	Bossier Parish	Louisiana
22017	Caddo Parish	Louisiana
22019	Calcasieu Parish	Louisiana
22021	Caldwell Parish	Louisiana
22023	Cameron Parish	Louisiana
22025	Catahoula Parish	Louisiana
22027	Claiborne Parish	Louisiana
22029	Concordia Parish	Louisiana
22031	De Soto Parish	Louisiana
22033	East Baton Rouge Parish	Louisiana
22035	East Carroll Parish	Louisiana
22037	East Feliciana Parish	Louisiana
22039	Evangeline Parish	Louisiana
22041	Franklin Parish	Louisiana
22043	Grant Parish	Louisiana
22045	Iberia Parish	Louisiana
22047	Iberville Parish	Louisiana
22049	Jackson Parish	Louisiana
22051	Jefferson Parish	Louisiana
22053	Jefferson Davis Parish	Louisiana
22055	Lafayette Parish	Louisiana
22057	Lafourche Parish	Louisiana
22059	LaSalle Parish (Note: The name "LaSalle Parish" was corrected from "La Salle Parish" in January 2011)	Louisiana
22061	Lincoln Parish	Louisiana
22063	Livingston Parish	Louisiana
22065	Madison Parish	Louisiana
22067	Morehouse Parish	Louisiana
22069	Natchitoches Parish	Louisiana
22071	Orleans Parish (Note: The City of New Orleans and Orleans Parish, Louisiana have a fully consolidated city and parish government.)	Louisiana
22073	Ouachita Parish	Louisiana
22075	Plaquemines Parish	Louisiana
22077	Pointe Coupee Parish	Louisiana
22079	Rapides Parish	Louisiana
22081	Red River Parish	Louisiana
22083	Richland Parish	Louisiana
22085	Sabine Parish	Louisiana
22087	St. Bernard Parish	Louisiana
22089	St. Charles Parish	Louisiana
22091	St. Helena Parish	Louisiana
22093	St. James Parish	Louisiana
22095	St. John the Baptist Parish	Louisiana
22097	St. Landry Parish	Louisiana
22099	St. Martin Parish	Louisiana
22101	St. Mary Parish	Louisiana
22103	St. Tammany Parish	Louisiana
22105	Tangipahoa Parish	Louisiana
22107	Tensas Parish	Louisiana
22109	Terrebonne Parish	Louisiana
22111	Union Parish	Louisiana
22113	Vermilion Parish	Louisiana
22115	Vernon Parish	Louisiana
22117	Washington Parish	Louisiana
22119	Webster Parish	Louisiana
22121	West Baton Rouge Parish	Louisiana
22123	West Carroll Parish	Louisiana
22125	West Feliciana Parish	Louisiana
22127	Winn Parish	Louisiana
23001	Androscoggin County	Maine
23003	Aroostook County	Maine
23005	Cumberland County	Maine
23007	Franklin County	Maine
23009	Hancock County	Maine
23011	Kennebec County	Maine
23013	Knox County	Maine
23015	Lincoln County	Maine
23017	Oxford County	Maine
23019	Penobscot County	Maine
23021	Piscataquis County	Maine
23023	Sagadahoc County	Maine
23025	Somerset County	Maine
23027	Waldo County	Maine
23029	Washington County	Maine
23031	York County	Maine
24001	Allegany County	Maryland
24003	Anne Arundel County	Maryland
24005	Baltimore County	Maryland
24009	Calvert County	Maryland
24011	Caroline County	Maryland
24013	Carroll County	Maryland
24015	Cecil County	Maryland
24017	Charles County	Maryland
24019	Dorchester County	Maryland
24021	Frederick County	Maryland
24023	Garrett County	Maryland
24025	Harford County	Maryland
24027	Howard County	Maryland
24029	Kent County	Maryland
24031	Montgomery County	Maryland
24033	Prince George's County	Maryland
24035	Queen Anne's County	Maryland
24037	St. Mary's County	Maryland
24039	Somerset County	Maryland
24041	Talbot County	Maryland
24043	Washington County	Maryland
24045	Wicomico County	Maryland
24047	Worcester County	Maryland
24510	Baltimore City (Note: The City of Baltimore, Maryland is an independent city exclusive of any county.)	Maryland
25001	Barnstable County	Massachusetts
25003	Berkshire County (Note: Has no functional county government.)	Massachusetts
25005	Bristol County	Massachusetts
25007	Dukes County	Massachusetts
25009	Essex County	Massachusetts
25011	Franklin County	Massachusetts
25013	Hampden County	Massachusetts
25015	Hampshire County	Massachusetts
25017	Middlesex County	Massachusetts
25019	Nantucket, Town and County of (Note: The Town and County of Nantucket, Massachusetts has a fully consolidated town and county government.)	Massachusetts
25021	Norfolk County	Massachusetts
25023	Plymouth County	Massachusetts
25025	Suffolk County	Massachusetts
25027	Worcester County	Massachusetts
26001	Alcona County	Michigan
26003	Alger County	Michigan
26005	Allegan County	Michigan
26007	Alpena County	Michigan
26009	Antrim County	Michigan
26011	Arenac County	Michigan
26013	Baraga County	Michigan
26015	Barry County	Michigan
26017	Bay County	Michigan
26019	Benzie County	Michigan
26021	Berrien County	Michigan
26023	Branch County	Michigan
26025	Calhoun County	Michigan
26027	Cass County	Michigan
26029	Charlevoix County	Michigan
26031	Cheboygan County	Michigan
26033	Chippewa County	Michigan
26035	Clare County	Michigan
26037	Clinton County	Michigan
26039	Crawford County	Michigan
26041	Delta County	Michigan
26043	Dickinson County	Michigan
26045	Eaton County	Michigan
26047	Emmet County	Michigan
26049	Genesee County	Michigan
26051	Gladwin County	Michigan
26053	Gogebic County	Michigan
26055	Grand Traverse County	Michigan
26057	Gratiot County	Michigan
26059	Hillsdale County	Michigan
26061	Houghton County	Michigan
26063	Huron County	Michigan
26065	Ingham County	Michigan
26067	Ionia County	Michigan
26069	Iosco County	Michigan
26071	Iron County	Michigan
26073	Isabella County	Michigan
26075	Jackson County	Michigan
26077	Kalamazoo County	Michigan
26079	Kalkaska County	Michigan
26081	Kent County	Michigan
26083	Keweenaw County	Michigan
26085	Lake County	Michigan
26087	Lapeer County	Michigan
26089	Leelanau County	Michigan
26091	Lenawee County	Michigan
26093	Livingston County	Michigan
26095	Luce County	Michigan
26097	Mackinac County	Michigan
26099	Macomb County	Michigan
26101	Manistee County	Michigan
26103	Marquette County	Michigan
26105	Mason County	Michigan
26107	Mecosta County	Michigan
26109	Menominee County	Michigan
26111	Midland County	Michigan
26113	Missaukee County	Michigan
26115	Monroe County	Michigan
26117	Montcalm County	Michigan
26119	Montmorency County	Michigan
26121	Muskegon County	Michigan
26123	Newaygo County	Michigan
26125	Oakland County	Michigan
26127	Oceana County	Michigan
26129	Ogemaw County	Michigan
26131	Ontonagon County	Michigan
26133	Osceola County	Michigan
26135	Oscoda County	Michigan
26137	Otsego County	Michigan
26139	Ottawa County	Michigan
26141	Presque Isle County	Michigan
26143	Roscommon County	Michigan
26145	Saginaw County	Michigan
26147	St. Clair County	Michigan
26149	St. Joseph County	Michigan
26151	Sanilac County	Michigan
26153	Schoolcraft County	Michigan
26155	Shiawassee County	Michigan
26157	Tuscola County	Michigan
26159	Van Buren County	Michigan
26161	Washtenaw County	Michigan
26163	Wayne County	Michigan
26165	Wexford County	Michigan
27001	Aitkin County	Minnesota
27003	Anoka County	Minnesota
27005	Becker County	Minnesota
27007	Beltrami County	Minnesota
27009	Benton County	Minnesota
27011	Big Stone County	Minnesota
27013	Blue Earth County	Minnesota
27015	Brown County	Minnesota
27017	Carlton County	Minnesota
27019	Carver County	Minnesota
27021	Cass County	Minnesota
27023	Chippewa County	Minnesota
27025	Chisago County	Minnesota
27027	Clay County	Minnesota
27029	Clearwater County	Minnesota
27031	Cook County	Minnesota
27033	Cottonwood County	Minnesota
27035	Crow Wing County	Minnesota
27037	Dakota County	Minnesota
27039	Dodge County	Minnesota
27041	Douglas County	Minnesota
27043	Faribault County	Minnesota
27045	Fillmore County	Minnesota
27047	Freeborn County	Minnesota
27049	Goodhue County	Minnesota
27051	Grant County	Minnesota
27053	Hennepin County	Minnesota
27055	Houston County	Minnesota
27057	Hubbard County	Minnesota
27059	Isanti County	Minnesota
27061	Itasca County	Minnesota
27063	Jackson County	Minnesota
27065	Kanabec County	Minnesota
27067	Kandiyohi County	Minnesota
27069	Kittson County	Minnesota
27071	Koochiching County	Minnesota
27073	Lac qui Parle County	Minnesota
27075	Lake County	Minnesota
27077	Lake of the Woods County	Minnesota
27079	Le Sueur County	Minnesota
27081	Lincoln County	Minnesota
27083	Lyon County	Minnesota
27085	McLeod County	Minnesota
27087	Mahnomen County	Minnesota
27089	Marshall County	Minnesota
27091	Martin County	Minnesota
27093	Meeker County	Minnesota
27095	Mille Lacs County	Minnesota
27097	Morrison County	Minnesota
27099	Mower County	Minnesota
27101	Murray County	Minnesota
27103	Nicollet County	Minnesota
27105	Nobles County	Minnesota
27107	Norman County	Minnesota
27109	Olmsted County	Minnesota
27111	Otter Tail County	Minnesota
27113	Pennington County	Minnesota
27115	Pine County	Minnesota
27117	Pipestone County	Minnesota
27119	Polk County	Minnesota
27121	Pope County	Minnesota
27123	Ramsey County	Minnesota
27125	Red Lake County	Minnesota
27127	Redwood County	Minnesota
27129	Renville County	Minnesota
27131	Rice County	Minnesota
27133	Rock County	Minnesota
27135	Roseau County	Minnesota
27137	St. Louis County	Minnesota
27139	Scott County	Minnesota
27141	Sherburne County	Minnesota
27143	Sibley County	Minnesota
27145	Stearns County	Minnesota
27147	Steele County	Minnesota
27149	Stevens County	Minnesota
27151	Swift County	Minnesota
27153	Todd County	Minnesota
27155	Traverse County	Minnesota
27157	Wabasha County	Minnesota
27159	Wadena County	Minnesota
27161	Waseca County	Minnesota
27163	Washington County	Minnesota
27165	Watonwan County	Minnesota
27167	Wilkin County	Minnesota
27169	Winona County	Minnesota
27171	Wright County	Minnesota
27173	Yellow Medicine County	Minnesota
28001	Adams County	Mississippi
28003	Alcorn County	Mississippi
28005	Amite County	Mississippi
28007	Attala County	Mississippi
28009	Benton County	Mississippi
28011	Bolivar County	Mississippi
28013	Calhoun County	Mississippi
28015	Carroll County	Mississippi
28017	Chickasaw County	Mississippi
28019	Choctaw County	Mississippi
28021	Claiborne County	Mississippi
28023	Clarke County	Mississippi
28025	Clay County	Mississippi
28027	Coahoma County	Mississippi
28029	Copiah County	Mississippi
28031	Covington County	Mississippi
28033	DeSoto County	Mississippi
28035	Forrest County	Mississippi
28037	Franklin County	Mississippi
28039	George County	Mississippi
28041	Greene County	Mississippi
28043	Grenada County	Mississippi
28045	Hancock County	Mississippi
28047	Harrison County	Mississippi
28049	Hinds County	Mississippi
28051	Holmes County	Mississippi
28053	Humphreys County	Mississippi
28055	Issaquena County	Mississippi
28057	Itawamba County	Mississippi
28059	Jackson County	Mississippi
28061	Jasper County	Mississippi
28063	Jefferson County	Mississippi
28065	Jefferson Davis County	Mississippi
28067	Jones County	Mississippi
28069	Kemper County	Mississippi
28071	Lafayette County	Mississippi
28073	Lamar County	Mississippi
28075	Lauderdale County	Mississippi
28077	Lawrence County	Mississippi
28079	Leake County	Mississippi
28081	Lee County	Mississippi
28083	Leflore County	Mississippi
28085	Lincoln County	Mississippi
28087	Lowndes County	Mississippi
28089	Madison County	Mississippi
28091	Marion County	Mississippi
28093	Marshall County	Mississippi
28095	Monroe County	Mississippi
28097	Montgomery County	Mississippi
28099	Neshoba County	Mississippi
28101	Newton County	Mississippi
28103	Noxubee County	Mississippi
28105	Oktibbeha County	Mississippi
28107	Panola County	Mississippi
28109	Pearl River County	Mississippi
28111	Perry County	Mississippi
28113	Pike County	Mississippi
28115	Pontotoc County	Mississippi
28117	Prentiss County	Mississippi
28119	Quitman County	Mississippi
28121	Rankin County	Mississippi
28123	Scott County	Mississippi
28125	Sharkey County	Mississippi
28127	Simpson County	Mississippi
28129	Smith County	Mississippi
28131	Stone County	Mississippi
28133	Sunflower County	Mississippi
28135	Tallahatchie County	Mississippi
28137	Tate County	Mississippi
28139	Tippah County	Mississippi
28141	Tishomingo County	Mississippi
28143	Tunica County	Mississippi
28145	Union County	Mississippi
28147	Walthall County	Mississippi
28149	Warren County	Mississippi
28151	Washington County	Mississippi
28153	Wayne County	Mississippi
28155	Webster County	Mississippi
28157	Wilkinson County	Mississippi
28159	Winston County	Mississippi
28161	Yalobusha County	Mississippi
28163	Yazoo County	Mississippi
29001	Adair County	Missouri
29003	Andrew County	Missouri
29005	Atchison County	Missouri
29007	Audrain County	Missouri
29009	Barry County	Missouri
29011	Barton County	Missouri
29013	Bates County	Missouri
29015	Benton County	Missouri
29017	Bollinger County	Missouri
29019	Boone County	Missouri
29021	Buchanan County	Missouri
29023	Butler County	Missouri
29025	Caldwell County	Missouri
29027	Callaway County	Missouri
29029	Camden County	Missouri
29031	Cape Girardeau County	Missouri
29033	Carroll County	Missouri
29035	Carter County	Missouri
29037	Cass County	Missouri
29039	Cedar County	Missouri
29041	Chariton County	Missouri
29043	Christian County	Missouri
29045	Clark County	Missouri
29047	Clay County	Missouri
29049	Clinton County	Missouri
29051	Cole County	Missouri
29053	Cooper County	Missouri
29055	Crawford County	Missouri
29057	Dade County	Missouri
29059	Dallas County	Missouri
29061	Daviess County	Missouri
29063	DeKalb County	Missouri
29065	Dent County	Missouri
29067	Douglas County	Missouri
29069	Dunklin County	Missouri
29071	Franklin County	Missouri
29073	Gasconade County	Missouri
29075	Gentry County	Missouri
29077	Greene County	Missouri
29079	Grundy County	Missouri
29081	Harrison County	Missouri
29083	Henry County	Missouri
29085	Hickory County	Missouri
29087	Holt County	Missouri
29089	Howard County	Missouri
29091	Howell County	Missouri
29093	Iron County	Missouri
29095	Jackson County	Missouri
29097	Jasper County	Missouri
29099	Jefferson County	Missouri
29101	Johnson County	Missouri
29103	Knox County	Missouri
29105	Laclede County	Missouri
29107	Lafayette County	Missouri
29109	Lawrence County	Missouri
29111	Lewis County	Missouri
29113	Lincoln County	Missouri
29115	Linn County	Missouri
29117	Livingston County	Missouri
29119	McDonald County	Missouri
29121	Macon County	Missouri
29123	Madison County	Missouri
29125	Maries County	Missouri
29127	Marion County	Missouri
29129	Mercer County	Missouri
29131	Miller County	Missouri
29133	Mississippi County	Missouri
29135	Moniteau County	Missouri
29137	Monroe County	Missouri
29139	Montgomery County	Missouri
29141	Morgan County	Missouri
29143	New Madrid County	Missouri
29145	Newton County	Missouri
29147	Nodaway County	Missouri
29149	Oregon County	Missouri
29151	Osage County	Missouri
29153	Ozark County	Missouri
29155	Pemiscot County	Missouri
29157	Perry County	Missouri
29159	Pettis County	Missouri
29161	Phelps County	Missouri
29163	Pike County	Missouri
29165	Platte County	Missouri
29167	Polk County	Missouri
29169	Pulaski County	Missouri
29171	Putnam County	Missouri
29173	Ralls County	Missouri
29175	Randolph County	Missouri
29177	Ray County	Missouri
29179	Reynolds County	Missouri
29181	Ripley County	Missouri
29183	St. Charles County	Missouri
29185	St. Clair County	Missouri
29186	Ste. Genevieve County	Missouri
29187	St. Francois County	Missouri
29189	St. Louis County	Missouri
29195	Saline County	Missouri
29197	Schuyler County	Missouri
29199	Scotland County	Missouri
29201	Scott County	Missouri
29203	Shannon County	Missouri
29205	Shelby County	Missouri
29207	Stoddard County	Missouri
29209	Stone County	Missouri
29211	Sullivan County	Missouri
29213	Taney County	Missouri
29215	Texas County	Missouri
29217	Vernon County	Missouri
29219	Warren County	Missouri
29221	Washington County	Missouri
29223	Wayne County	Missouri
29225	Webster County	Missouri
29227	Worth County	Missouri
29229	Wright County	Missouri
29510	St. Louis, City of (Note: The City of St. Louis, Missouri is an independent city exclusive of any county.)	Missouri
30001	Beaverhead County	Montana
30003	Big Horn County	Montana
30005	Blaine County	Montana
30007	Broadwater County	Montana
30009	Carbon County	Montana
30011	Carter County	Montana
30013	Cascade County	Montana
30015	Chouteau County	Montana
30017	Custer County	Montana
30019	Daniels County	Montana
30021	Dawson County	Montana
30023	Deer Lodge County	Montana
30025	Fallon County	Montana
30027	Fergus County	Montana
30029	Flathead County	Montana
30031	Gallatin County	Montana
30033	Garfield County	Montana
30035	Glacier County	Montana
30037	Golden Valley County	Montana
30039	Granite County	Montana
30041	Hill County	Montana
30043	Jefferson County	Montana
30045	Judith Basin County	Montana
30047	Lake County	Montana
30049	Lewis and Clark County	Montana
30051	Liberty County	Montana
30053	Lincoln County	Montana
30055	McCone County	Montana
30057	Madison County	Montana
30059	Meagher County	Montana
30061	Mineral County	Montana
30063	Missoula County	Montana
30065	Musselshell County	Montana
30067	Park County	Montana
30069	Petroleum County	Montana
30071	Phillips County	Montana
30073	Pondera County	Montana
30075	Powder River County	Montana
30077	Powell County	Montana
30079	Prairie County	Montana
30081	Ravalli County	Montana
30083	Richland County	Montana
30085	Roosevelt County	Montana
30087	Rosebud County	Montana
30089	Sanders County	Montana
30091	Sheridan County	Montana
30093	Silver Bow County	Montana
30095	Stillwater County	Montana
30097	Sweet Grass County	Montana
30099	Teton County	Montana
30101	Toole County	Montana
30103	Treasure County	Montana
30105	Valley County	Montana
30107	Wheatland County	Montana
30109	Wibaux County	Montana
30111	Yellowstone County	Montana
31001	Adams County	Nebraska
31003	Antelope County	Nebraska
31005	Arthur County	Nebraska
31007	Banner County	Nebraska
31009	Blaine County	Nebraska
31011	Boone County	Nebraska
31013	Box Butte County	Nebraska
31015	Boyd County	Nebraska
31017	Brown County	Nebraska
31019	Buffalo County	Nebraska
31021	Burt County	Nebraska
31023	Butler County	Nebraska
31025	Cass County	Nebraska
31027	Cedar County	Nebraska
31029	Chase County	Nebraska
31031	Cherry County	Nebraska
31033	Cheyenne County	Nebraska
31035	Clay County	Nebraska
31037	Colfax County	Nebraska
31039	Cuming County	Nebraska
31041	Custer County	Nebraska
31043	Dakota County	Nebraska
31045	Dawes County	Nebraska
31047	Dawson County	Nebraska
31049	Deuel County	Nebraska
31051	Dixon County	Nebraska
31053	Dodge County	Nebraska
31055	Douglas County	Nebraska
31057	Dundy County	Nebraska
31059	Fillmore County	Nebraska
31061	Franklin County	Nebraska
31063	Frontier County	Nebraska
31065	Furnas County	Nebraska
31067	Gage County	Nebraska
31069	Garden County	Nebraska
31071	Garfield County	Nebraska
31073	Gosper County	Nebraska
31075	Grant County	Nebraska
31077	Greeley County	Nebraska
31079	Hall County	Nebraska
31081	Hamilton County	Nebraska
31083	Harlan County	Nebraska
31085	Hayes County	Nebraska
31087	Hitchcock County	Nebraska
31089	Holt County	Nebraska
31091	Hooker County	Nebraska
31093	Howard County	Nebraska
31095	Jefferson County	Nebraska
31097	Johnson County	Nebraska
31099	Kearney County	Nebraska
31101	Keith County	Nebraska
31103	Keya Paha County	Nebraska
31105	Kimball County	Nebraska
31107	Knox County	Nebraska
31109	Lancaster County	Nebraska
31111	Lincoln County	Nebraska
31113	Logan County	Nebraska
31115	Loup County	Nebraska
31117	McPherson County	Nebraska
31119	Madison County	Nebraska
31121	Merrick County	Nebraska
31123	Morrill County	Nebraska
31125	Nance County	Nebraska
31127	Nemaha County	Nebraska
31129	Nuckolls County	Nebraska
31131	Otoe County	Nebraska
31133	Pawnee County	Nebraska
31135	Perkins County	Nebraska
31137	Phelps County	Nebraska
31139	Pierce County	Nebraska
31141	Platte County	Nebraska
31143	Polk County	Nebraska
31145	Red Willow County	Nebraska
31147	Richardson County	Nebraska
31149	Rock County	Nebraska
31151	Saline County	Nebraska
31153	Sarpy County	Nebraska
31155	Saunders County	Nebraska
31157	Scotts Bluff County	Nebraska
31159	Seward County	Nebraska
31161	Sheridan County	Nebraska
31163	Sherman County	Nebraska
31165	Sioux County	Nebraska
31167	Stanton County	Nebraska
31169	Thayer County	Nebraska
31171	Thomas County	Nebraska
31173	Thurston County	Nebraska
31175	Valley County	Nebraska
31177	Washington County	Nebraska
31179	Wayne County	Nebraska
31181	Webster County	Nebraska
31183	Wheeler County	Nebraska
31185	York County	Nebraska
32001	Churchill County	Nevada
32003	Clark County	Nevada
32005	Douglas County	Nevada
32007	Elko County	Nevada
32009	Esmeralda County	Nevada
32011	Eureka County	Nevada
32013	Humboldt County	Nevada
32015	Lander County	Nevada
32017	Lincoln County	Nevada
32019	Lyon County	Nevada
32021	Mineral County	Nevada
32023	Nye County	Nevada
32027	Pershing County	Nevada
32029	Storey County	Nevada
32031	Washoe County	Nevada
32033	White Pine County	Nevada
32510	Carson City, Consolidated Municipality of (Note: The Consolidated Municipality of Carson City, Nevada is an independent city exclusive of any county.)	Nevada
33001	Belknap County	New Hampshire
33003	Carroll County	New Hampshire
33005	Cheshire County	New Hampshire
33007	Coos County	New Hampshire
33009	Grafton County	New Hampshire
33011	Hillsborough County	New Hampshire
33013	Merrimack County	New Hampshire
33015	Rockingham County	New Hampshire
33017	Strafford County	New Hampshire
33019	Sullivan County	New Hampshire
34001	Atlantic County	New Jersey
34003	Bergen County	New Jersey
34005	Burlington County	New Jersey
34007	Camden County	New Jersey
34009	Cape May County	New Jersey
34011	Cumberland County	New Jersey
34013	Essex County	New Jersey
34015	Gloucester County	New Jersey
34017	Hudson County	New Jersey
34019	Hunterdon County	New Jersey
34021	Mercer County	New Jersey
34023	Middlesex County	New Jersey
34025	Monmouth County	New Jersey
34027	Morris County	New Jersey
34029	Ocean County	New Jersey
34031	Passaic County	New Jersey
34033	Salem County	New Jersey
34035	Somerset County	New Jersey
34037	Sussex County	New Jersey
34039	Union County	New Jersey
34041	Warren County	New Jersey
35001	Bernalillo County	New Mexico
35003	Catron County	New Mexico
35005	Chaves County	New Mexico
35006	Cibola County	New Mexico
35007	Colfax County	New Mexico
35009	Curry County	New Mexico
35011	De Baca County	New Mexico
35013	Doña Ana County	New Mexico
35015	Eddy County	New Mexico
35017	Grant County	New Mexico
35019	Guadalupe County	New Mexico
35021	Harding County	New Mexico
35023	Hidalgo County	New Mexico
35025	Lea County	New Mexico
35027	Lincoln County	New Mexico
35028	Los Alamos County (Note: Los Alamos County, New Mexico has a county government with municipal functions.)	New Mexico
35029	Luna County	New Mexico
35031	McKinley County	New Mexico
35033	Mora County	New Mexico
35035	Otero County	New Mexico
35037	Quay County	New Mexico
35039	Rio Arriba County	New Mexico
35041	Roosevelt County	New Mexico
35043	Sandoval County	New Mexico
35045	San Juan County	New Mexico
35047	San Miguel County	New Mexico
35049	Santa Fe County	New Mexico
35051	Sierra County	New Mexico
35053	Socorro County	New Mexico
35055	Taos County	New Mexico
35057	Torrance County	New Mexico
35059	Union County	New Mexico
35061	Valencia County	New Mexico
36001	Albany County	(New York (state)) New York
36003	Allegany County	(New York (state)) New York
36005	Bronx County	(New York (state)) New York
36007	Broome County	(New York (state)) New York
36009	Cattaraugus County	(New York (state)) New York
36011	Cayuga County	(New York (state)) New York
36013	Chautauqua County	(New York (state)) New York
36015	Chemung County	(New York (state)) New York
36017	Chenango County	(New York (state)) New York
36019	Clinton County	(New York (state)) New York
36021	Columbia County	(New York (state)) New York
36023	Cortland County	(New York (state)) New York
36025	Delaware County	(New York (state)) New York
36027	Dutchess County	(New York (state)) New York
36029	Erie County	(New York (state)) New York
36031	Essex County	(New York (state)) New York
36033	Franklin County	(New York (state)) New York
36035	Fulton County	(New York (state)) New York
36037	Genesee County	(New York (state)) New York
36039	Greene County	(New York (state)) New York
36041	Hamilton County	(New York (state)) New York
36043	Herkimer County	(New York (state)) New York
36045	Jefferson County	(New York (state)) New York
36047	Kings County	(New York (state)) New York
36049	Lewis County	(New York (state)) New York
36051	Livingston County	(New York (state)) New York
36053	Madison County	(New York (state)) New York
36055	Monroe County	(New York (state)) New York
36057	Montgomery County	(New York (state)) New York
36059	Nassau County	(New York (state)) New York
36061	New York County	(New York (state)) New York
36063	Niagara County	(New York (state)) New York
36065	Oneida County	(New York (state)) New York
36067	Onondaga County	(New York (state)) New York
36069	Ontario County	(New York (state)) New York
36071	Orange County	(New York (state)) New York
36073	Orleans County	(New York (state)) New York
36075	Oswego County	(New York (state)) New York
36077	Otsego County	(New York (state)) New York
36079	Putnam County	(New York (state)) New York
36081	Queens County	(New York (state)) New York
36083	Rensselaer County	(New York (state)) New York
36085	Richmond County	(New York (state)) New York
36087	Rockland County	(New York (state)) New York
36089	St. Lawrence County	(New York (state)) New York
36091	Saratoga County	(New York (state)) New York
36093	Schenectady County	(New York (state)) New York
36095	Schoharie County	(New York (state)) New York
36097	Schuyler County	(New York (state)) New York
36099	Seneca County	(New York (state)) New York
36101	Steuben County	(New York (state)) New York
36103	Suffolk County	(New York (state)) New York
36105	Sullivan County	(New York (state)) New York
36107	Tioga County	(New York (state)) New York
36109	Tompkins County	(New York (state)) New York
36111	Ulster County	(New York (state)) New York
36113	Warren County	(New York (state)) New York
36115	Washington County	(New York (state)) New York
36117	Wayne County	(New York (state)) New York
36119	Westchester County	(New York (state)) New York
36121	Wyoming County	(New York (state)) New York
36123	Yates County	(New York (state)) New York
37001	Alamance County	North Carolina
37003	Alexander County	North Carolina
37005	Alleghany County	North Carolina
37007	Anson County	North Carolina
37009	Ashe County	North Carolina
37011	Avery County	North Carolina
37013	Beaufort County	North Carolina
37015	Bertie County	North Carolina
37017	Bladen County	North Carolina
37019	Brunswick County	North Carolina
37021	Buncombe County	North Carolina
37023	Burke County	North Carolina
37025	Cabarrus County	North Carolina
37027	Caldwell County	North Carolina
37029	Camden County	North Carolina
37031	Carteret County	North Carolina
37033	Caswell County	North Carolina
37035	Catawba County	North Carolina
37037	Chatham County	North Carolina
37039	Cherokee County	North Carolina
37041	Chowan County	North Carolina
37043	Clay County	North Carolina
37045	Cleveland County	North Carolina
37047	Columbus County	North Carolina
37049	Craven County	North Carolina
37051	Cumberland County	North Carolina
37053	Currituck County	North Carolina
37055	Dare County	North Carolina
37057	Davidson County	North Carolina
37059	Davie County	North Carolina
37061	Duplin County	North Carolina
37063	Durham County	North Carolina
37065	Edgecombe County	North Carolina
37067	Forsyth County	North Carolina
37069	Franklin County	North Carolina
37071	Gaston County	North Carolina
37073	Gates County	North Carolina
37075	Graham County	North Carolina
37077	Granville County	North Carolina
37079	Greene County	North Carolina
37081	Guilford County	North Carolina
37083	Halifax County	North Carolina
37085	Harnett County	North Carolina
37087	Haywood County	North Carolina
37089	Henderson County	North Carolina
37091	Hertford County	North Carolina
37093	Hoke County	North Carolina
37095	Hyde County	North Carolina
37097	Iredell County	North Carolina
37099	Jackson County	North Carolina
37101	Johnston County	North Carolina
37103	Jones County	North Carolina
37105	Lee County	North Carolina
37107	Lenoir County	North Carolina
37109	Lincoln County	North Carolina
37111	McDowell County	North Carolina
37113	Macon County	North Carolina
37115	Madison County	North Carolina
37117	Martin County	North Carolina
37119	Mecklenburg County	North Carolina
37121	Mitchell County	North Carolina
37123	Montgomery County	North Carolina
37125	Moore County	North Carolina
37127	Nash County	North Carolina
37129	New Hanover County	North Carolina
37131	Northampton County	North Carolina
37133	Onslow County	North Carolina
37135	Orange County	North Carolina
37137	Pamlico County	North Carolina
37139	Pasquotank County	North Carolina
37141	Pender County	North Carolina
37143	Perquimans County	North Carolina
37145	Person County	North Carolina
37147	Pitt County	North Carolina
37149	Polk County	North Carolina
37151	Randolph County	North Carolina
37153	Richmond County	North Carolina
37155	Robeson County	North Carolina
37157	Rockingham County	North Carolina
37159	Rowan County	North Carolina
37161	Rutherford County	North Carolina
37163	Sampson County	North Carolina
37165	Scotland County	North Carolina
37167	Stanly County	North Carolina
37169	Stokes County	North Carolina
37171	Surry County	North Carolina
37173	Swain County	North Carolina
37175	Transylvania County	North Carolina
37177	Tyrrell County	North Carolina
37179	Union County	North Carolina
37181	Vance County	North Carolina
37183	Wake County	North Carolina
37185	Warren County	North Carolina
37187	Washington County	North Carolina
37189	Watauga County	North Carolina
37191	Wayne County	North Carolina
37193	Wilkes County	North Carolina
37195	Wilson County	North Carolina
37197	Yadkin County	North Carolina
37199	Yancey County	North Carolina
38001	Adams County	North Dakota
38003	Barnes County	North Dakota
38005	Benson County	North Dakota
38007	Billings County	North Dakota
38009	Bottineau County	North Dakota
38011	Bowman County	North Dakota
38013	Burke County	North Dakota
38015	Burleigh County	North Dakota
38017	Cass County	North Dakota
38019	Cavalier County	North Dakota
38021	Dickey County	North Dakota
38023	Divide County	North Dakota
38025	Dunn County	North Dakota
38027	Eddy County	North Dakota
38029	Emmons County	North Dakota
38031	Foster County	North Dakota
38033	Golden Valley County	North Dakota
38035	Grand Forks County	North Dakota
38037	Grant County	North Dakota
38039	Griggs County	North Dakota
38041	Hettinger County	North Dakota
38043	Kidder County	North Dakota
38045	LaMoure County	North Dakota
38047	Logan County	North Dakota
38049	McHenry County	North Dakota
38051	McIntosh County	North Dakota
38053	McKenzie County	North Dakota
38055	McLean County	North Dakota
38057	Mercer County	North Dakota
38059	Morton County	North Dakota
38061	Mountrail County	North Dakota
38063	Nelson County	North Dakota
38065	Oliver County	North Dakota
38067	Pembina County	North Dakota
38069	Pierce County	North Dakota
38071	Ramsey County	North Dakota
38073	Ransom County	North Dakota
38075	Renville County	North Dakota
38077	Richland County	North Dakota
38079	Rolette County	North Dakota
38081	Sargent County	North Dakota
38083	Sheridan County	North Dakota
38085	Sioux County	North Dakota
38087	Slope County	North Dakota
38089	Stark County	North Dakota
38091	Steele County	North Dakota
38093	Stutsman County	North Dakota
38095	Towner County	North Dakota
38097	Traill County	North Dakota
38099	Walsh County	North Dakota
38101	Ward County	North Dakota
38103	Wells County	North Dakota
38105	Williams County	North Dakota
69085	Northern Islands Municipality	Northern Mariana Islands
69100	Rota Municipality	Northern Mariana Islands
69110	Saipan Municipality	Northern Mariana Islands
69120	Tinian Municipality	Northern Mariana Islands
39001	Adams County	Ohio
39003	Allen County	Ohio
39005	Ashland County	Ohio
39007	Ashtabula County	Ohio
39009	Athens County	Ohio
39011	Auglaize County	Ohio
39013	Belmont County	Ohio
39015	Brown County	Ohio
39017	Butler County	Ohio
39019	Carroll County	Ohio
39021	Champaign County	Ohio
39023	Clark County	Ohio
39025	Clermont County	Ohio
39027	Clinton County	Ohio
39029	Columbiana County	Ohio
39031	Coshocton County	Ohio
39033	Crawford County	Ohio
39035	Cuyahoga County	Ohio
39037	Darke County	Ohio
39039	Defiance County	Ohio
39041	Delaware County	Ohio
39043	Erie County	Ohio
39045	Fairfield County	Ohio
39047	Fayette County	Ohio
39049	Franklin County	Ohio
39051	Fulton County	Ohio
39053	Gallia County	Ohio
39055	Geauga County	Ohio
39057	Greene County	Ohio
39059	Guernsey County	Ohio
39061	Hamilton County	Ohio
39063	Hancock County	Ohio
39065	Hardin County	Ohio
39067	Harrison County	Ohio
39069	Henry County	Ohio
39071	Highland County	Ohio
39073	Hocking County	Ohio
39075	Holmes County	Ohio
39077	Huron County	Ohio
39079	Jackson County	Ohio
39081	Jefferson County	Ohio
39083	Knox County	Ohio
39085	Lake County	Ohio
39087	Lawrence County	Ohio
39089	Licking County	Ohio
39091	Logan County	Ohio
39093	Lorain County	Ohio
39095	Lucas County	Ohio
39097	Madison County	Ohio
39099	Mahoning County	Ohio
39101	Marion County	Ohio
39103	Medina County	Ohio
39105	Meigs County	Ohio
39107	Mercer County	Ohio
39109	Miami County	Ohio
39111	Monroe County	Ohio
39113	Montgomery County	Ohio
39115	Morgan County	Ohio
39117	Morrow County	Ohio
39119	Muskingum County	Ohio
39121	Noble County	Ohio
39123	Ottawa County	Ohio
39125	Paulding County	Ohio
39127	Perry County	Ohio
39129	Pickaway County	Ohio
39131	Pike County	Ohio
39133	Portage County	Ohio
39135	Preble County	Ohio
39137	Putnam County	Ohio
39139	Richland County	Ohio
39141	Ross County	Ohio
39143	Sandusky County	Ohio
39145	Scioto County	Ohio
39147	Seneca County	Ohio
39149	Shelby County	Ohio
39151	Stark County	Ohio
39153	Summit County	Ohio
39155	Trumbull County	Ohio
39157	Tuscarawas County	Ohio
39159	Union County	Ohio
39161	Van Wert County	Ohio
39163	Vinton County	Ohio
39165	Warren County	Ohio
39167	Washington County	Ohio
39169	Wayne County	Ohio
39171	Williams County	Ohio
39173	Wood County	Ohio
39175	Wyandot County	Ohio
40001	Adair County	Oklahoma
40003	Alfalfa County	Oklahoma
40005	Atoka County	Oklahoma
40007	Beaver County	Oklahoma
40009	Beckham County	Oklahoma
40011	Blaine County	Oklahoma
40013	Bryan County	Oklahoma
40015	Caddo County	Oklahoma
40017	Canadian County	Oklahoma
40019	Carter County	Oklahoma
40021	Cherokee County	Oklahoma
40023	Choctaw County	Oklahoma
40025	Cimarron County	Oklahoma
40027	Cleveland County	Oklahoma
40029	Coal County	Oklahoma
40031	Comanche County	Oklahoma
40033	Cotton County	Oklahoma
40035	Craig County	Oklahoma
40037	Creek County	Oklahoma
40039	Custer County	Oklahoma
40041	Delaware County	Oklahoma
40043	Dewey County	Oklahoma
40045	Ellis County	Oklahoma
40047	Garfield County	Oklahoma
40049	Garvin County	Oklahoma
40051	Grady County	Oklahoma
40053	Grant County	Oklahoma
40055	Greer County	Oklahoma
40057	Harmon County	Oklahoma
40059	Harper County	Oklahoma
40061	Haskell County	Oklahoma
40063	Hughes County	Oklahoma
40065	Jackson County	Oklahoma
40067	Jefferson County	Oklahoma
40069	Johnston County	Oklahoma
40071	Kay County	Oklahoma
40073	Kingfisher County	Oklahoma
40075	Kiowa County	Oklahoma
40077	Latimer County	Oklahoma
40079	Le Flore County	Oklahoma
40081	Lincoln County	Oklahoma
40083	Logan County	Oklahoma
40085	Love County	Oklahoma
40087	McClain County	Oklahoma
40089	McCurtain County	Oklahoma
40091	McIntosh County	Oklahoma
40093	Major County	Oklahoma
40095	Marshall County	Oklahoma
40097	Mayes County	Oklahoma
40099	Murray County	Oklahoma
40101	Muskogee County	Oklahoma
40103	Noble County	Oklahoma
40105	Nowata County	Oklahoma
40107	Okfuskee County	Oklahoma
40109	Oklahoma County	Oklahoma
40111	Okmulgee County	Oklahoma
40113	Osage County	Oklahoma
40115	Ottawa County	Oklahoma
40117	Pawnee County	Oklahoma
40119	Payne County	Oklahoma
40121	Pittsburg County	Oklahoma
40123	Pontotoc County	Oklahoma
40125	Pottawatomie County	Oklahoma
40127	Pushmataha County	Oklahoma
40129	Roger Mills County	Oklahoma
40131	Rogers County	Oklahoma
40133	Seminole County	Oklahoma
40135	Sequoyah County	Oklahoma
40137	Stephens County	Oklahoma
40139	Texas County	Oklahoma
40141	Tillman County	Oklahoma
40143	Tulsa County	Oklahoma
40145	Wagoner County	Oklahoma
40147	Washington County	Oklahoma
40149	Washita County	Oklahoma
40151	Woods County	Oklahoma
40153	Woodward County	Oklahoma
41001	Baker County	Oregon
41003	Benton County	Oregon
41005	Clackamas County	Oregon
41007	Clatsop County	Oregon
41009	Columbia County	Oregon
41011	Coos County	Oregon
41013	Crook County	Oregon
41015	Curry County	Oregon
41017	Deschutes County	Oregon
41019	Douglas County	Oregon
41021	Gilliam County	Oregon
41023	Grant County	Oregon
41025	Harney County	Oregon
41027	Hood River County	Oregon
41029	Jackson County	Oregon
41031	Jefferson County	Oregon
41033	Josephine County	Oregon
41035	Klamath County	Oregon
41037	Lake County	Oregon
41039	Lane County	Oregon
41041	Lincoln County	Oregon
41043	Linn County	Oregon
41045	Malheur County	Oregon
41047	Marion County	Oregon
41049	Morrow County	Oregon
41051	Multnomah County	Oregon
41053	Polk County	Oregon
41055	Sherman County	Oregon
41057	Tillamook County	Oregon
41059	Umatilla County	Oregon
41061	Union County	Oregon
41063	Wallowa County	Oregon
41065	Wasco County	Oregon
41067	Washington County	Oregon
41069	Wheeler County	Oregon
41071	Yamhill County	Oregon
42001	Adams County	Pennsylvania
42003	Allegheny County	Pennsylvania
42005	Armstrong County	Pennsylvania
42007	Beaver County	Pennsylvania
42009	Bedford County	Pennsylvania
42011	Berks County	Pennsylvania
42013	Blair County	Pennsylvania
42015	Bradford County	Pennsylvania
42017	Bucks County	Pennsylvania
42019	Butler County	Pennsylvania
42021	Cambria County	Pennsylvania
42023	Cameron County	Pennsylvania
42025	Carbon County	Pennsylvania
42027	Centre County	Pennsylvania
42029	Chester County	Pennsylvania
42031	Clarion County	Pennsylvania
42033	Clearfield County	Pennsylvania
42035	Clinton County	Pennsylvania
42037	Columbia County	Pennsylvania
42039	Crawford County	Pennsylvania
42041	Cumberland County	Pennsylvania
42043	Dauphin County	Pennsylvania
42045	Delaware County	Pennsylvania
42047	Elk County	Pennsylvania
42049	Erie County	Pennsylvania
42051	Fayette County	Pennsylvania
42053	Forest County	Pennsylvania
42055	Franklin County	Pennsylvania
42057	Fulton County	Pennsylvania
42059	Greene County	Pennsylvania
42061	Huntingdon County	Pennsylvania
42063	Indiana County	Pennsylvania
42065	Jefferson County	Pennsylvania
42067	Juniata County	Pennsylvania
42069	Lackawanna County	Pennsylvania
42071	Lancaster County	Pennsylvania
42073	Lawrence County	Pennsylvania
42075	Lebanon County	Pennsylvania
42077	Lehigh County	Pennsylvania
42079	Luzerne County	Pennsylvania
42081	Lycoming County	Pennsylvania
42083	McKean County	Pennsylvania
42085	Mercer County	Pennsylvania
42087	Mifflin County	Pennsylvania
42089	Monroe County	Pennsylvania
42091	Montgomery County	Pennsylvania
42093	Montour County	Pennsylvania
42095	Northampton County	Pennsylvania
42097	Northumberland County	Pennsylvania
42099	Perry County	Pennsylvania
42101	Philadelphia County (Note: The City of Philadelphia and Philadelphia County, Pennsylvania have a fully consolidated city and county government.)	Pennsylvania
42103	Pike County	Pennsylvania
42105	Potter County	Pennsylvania
42107	Schuylkill County	Pennsylvania
42109	Snyder County	Pennsylvania
42111	Somerset County	Pennsylvania
42113	Sullivan County	Pennsylvania
42115	Susquehanna County	Pennsylvania
42117	Tioga County	Pennsylvania
42119	Union County	Pennsylvania
42121	Venango County	Pennsylvania
42123	Warren County	Pennsylvania
42125	Washington County	Pennsylvania
42127	Wayne County	Pennsylvania
42129	Westmoreland County	Pennsylvania
42131	Wyoming County	Pennsylvania
42133	York County	Pennsylvania
72001	Adjuntas Municipality	Puerto Rico
72003	Aguada Municipality	Puerto Rico
72005	Aguadilla Municipality	Puerto Rico
72007	Aguas Buenas Municipality	Puerto Rico
72009	Aibonito Municipality	Puerto Rico
72011	Añasco Municipality	Puerto Rico
72013	Arecibo Municipality	Puerto Rico
72015	Arroyo Municipality	Puerto Rico
72017	Barceloneta Municipality	Puerto Rico
72019	Barranquitas Municipality	Puerto Rico
72021	Bayamón Municipality	Puerto Rico
72023	Cabo Rojo Municipality	Puerto Rico
72025	Caguas Municipality	Puerto Rico
72027	Camuy Municipality	Puerto Rico
72029	Canóvanas Municipality	Puerto Rico
72031	Carolina Municipality	Puerto Rico
72033	Cataño Municipality	Puerto Rico
72035	Cayey Municipality	Puerto Rico
72037	Ceiba Municipality	Puerto Rico
72039	Ciales Municipality	Puerto Rico
72041	Cidra Municipality	Puerto Rico
72043	Coamo Municipality	Puerto Rico
72045	Comerío Municipality	Puerto Rico
72047	Corozal Municipality	Puerto Rico
72049	Culebra Municipality	Puerto Rico
72051	Dorado Municipality	Puerto Rico
72053	Fajardo Municipality	Puerto Rico
72054	Florida Municipality	Puerto Rico
72055	Guánica Municipality	Puerto Rico
72057	Guayama Municipality	Puerto Rico
72059	Guayanilla Municipality	Puerto Rico
72061	Guaynabo Municipality	Puerto Rico
72063	Gurabo Municipality	Puerto Rico
72065	Hatillo Municipality	Puerto Rico
72067	Hormigueros Municipality	Puerto Rico
72069	Humacao Municipality	Puerto Rico
72071	Isabela Municipality	Puerto Rico
72073	Jayuya Municipality	Puerto Rico
72075	Juana Díaz Municipality	Puerto Rico
72077	Juncos Municipality	Puerto Rico
72079	Lajas Municipality	Puerto Rico
72081	Lares Municipality	Puerto Rico
72083	Las Marías Municipality	Puerto Rico
72085	Las Piedras Municipality	Puerto Rico
72087	Loíza Municipality	Puerto Rico
72089	Luquillo Municipality	Puerto Rico
72091	Manatí Municipality	Puerto Rico
72093	Maricao Municipality	Puerto Rico
72095	Maunabo Municipality	Puerto Rico
72097	Mayagüez Municipality	Puerto Rico
72099	Moca Municipality	Puerto Rico
72101	Morovis Municipality	Puerto Rico
72103	Naguabo Municipality	Puerto Rico
72105	Naranjito Municipality	Puerto Rico
72107	Orocovis Municipality	Puerto Rico
72109	Patillas Municipality	Puerto Rico
72111	Peñuelas Municipality	Puerto Rico
72113	Ponce Municipality	Puerto Rico
72115	Quebradillas Municipality	Puerto Rico
72117	Rincón Municipality	Puerto Rico
72119	Río Grande Municipality	Puerto Rico
72121	Sabana Grande Municipality	Puerto Rico
72123	Salinas Municipality	Puerto Rico
72125	San Germán Municipality	Puerto Rico
72127	San Juan Municipality	Puerto Rico
72129	San Lorenzo Municipality	Puerto Rico
72131	San Sebastián Municipality	Puerto Rico
72133	Santa Isabel Municipality	Puerto Rico
72135	Toa Alta Municipality	Puerto Rico
72137	Toa Baja Municipality	Puerto Rico
72139	Trujillo Alto Municipality	Puerto Rico
72141	Utuado Municipality	Puerto Rico
72143	Vega Alta Municipality	Puerto Rico
72145	Vega Baja Municipality	Puerto Rico
72147	Vieques Municipality	Puerto Rico
72149	Villalba Municipality	Puerto Rico
72151	Yabucoa Municipality	Puerto Rico
72153	Yauco Municipality	Puerto Rico
44001	Bristol County	Rhode Island
44003	Kent County	Rhode Island
44005	Newport County	Rhode Island
44007	Providence County	Rhode Island
44009	Washington County	Rhode Island
45001	Abbeville County	South Carolina
45003	Aiken County	South Carolina
45005	Allendale County	South Carolina
45007	Anderson County	South Carolina
45009	Bamberg County	South Carolina
45011	Barnwell County	South Carolina
45013	Beaufort County	South Carolina
45015	Berkeley County	South Carolina
45017	Calhoun County	South Carolina
45019	Charleston County	South Carolina
45021	Cherokee County	South Carolina
45023	Chester County	South Carolina
45025	Chesterfield County	South Carolina
45027	Clarendon County	South Carolina
45029	Colleton County	South Carolina
45031	Darlington County	South Carolina
45033	Dillon County	South Carolina
45035	Dorchester County	South Carolina
45037	Edgefield County	South Carolina
45039	Fairfield County	South Carolina
45041	Florence County	South Carolina
45043	Georgetown County	South Carolina
45045	Greenville County	South Carolina
45047	Greenwood County	South Carolina
45049	Hampton County	South Carolina
45051	Horry County	South Carolina
45053	Jasper County	South Carolina
45055	Kershaw County	South Carolina
45057	Lancaster County	South Carolina
45059	Laurens County	South Carolina
45061	Lee County	South Carolina
45063	Lexington County	South Carolina
45065	McCormick County	South Carolina
45067	Marion County	South Carolina
45069	Marlboro County	South Carolina
45071	Newberry County	South Carolina
45073	Oconee County	South Carolina
45075	Orangeburg County	South Carolina
45077	Pickens County	South Carolina
45079	Richland County	South Carolina
45081	Saluda County	South Carolina
45083	Spartanburg County	South Carolina
45085	Sumter County	South Carolina
45087	Union County	South Carolina
45089	Williamsburg County	South Carolina
45091	York County	South Carolina
46003	Aurora County	South Dakota
46005	Beadle County	South Dakota
46007	Bennett County	South Dakota
46009	Bon Homme County	South Dakota
46011	Brookings County	South Dakota
46013	Brown County	South Dakota
46015	Brule County	South Dakota
46017	Buffalo County	South Dakota
46019	Butte County	South Dakota
46021	Campbell County	South Dakota
46023	Charles Mix County	South Dakota
46025	Clark County	South Dakota
46027	Clay County	South Dakota
46029	Codington County	South Dakota
46031	Corson County	South Dakota
46033	Custer County	South Dakota
46035	Davison County	South Dakota
46037	Day County	South Dakota
46039	Deuel County	South Dakota
46041	Dewey County	South Dakota
46043	Douglas County	South Dakota
46045	Edmunds County	South Dakota
46047	Fall River County	South Dakota
46049	Faulk County	South Dakota
46051	Grant County	South Dakota
46053	Gregory County	South Dakota
46055	Haakon County	South Dakota
46057	Hamlin County	South Dakota
46059	Hand County	South Dakota
46061	Hanson County	South Dakota
46063	Harding County	South Dakota
46065	Hughes County	South Dakota
46067	Hutchinson County	South Dakota
46069	Hyde County	South Dakota
46071	Jackson County	South Dakota
46073	Jerauld County	South Dakota
46075	Jones County	South Dakota
46077	Kingsbury County	South Dakota
46079	Lake County	South Dakota
46081	Lawrence County	South Dakota
46083	Lincoln County	South Dakota
46085	Lyman County	South Dakota
46087	McCook County	South Dakota
46089	McPherson County	South Dakota
46091	Marshall County	South Dakota
46093	Meade County	South Dakota
46095	Mellette County	South Dakota
46097	Miner County	South Dakota
46099	Minnehaha County	South Dakota
46101	Moody County	South Dakota
46102	Oglala Lakota County	South Dakota
46103	Pennington County	South Dakota
46105	Perkins County	South Dakota
46107	Potter County	South Dakota
46109	Roberts County	South Dakota
46111	Sanborn County	South Dakota
46115	Spink County	South Dakota
46117	Stanley County	South Dakota
46119	Sully County	South Dakota
46121	Todd County	South Dakota
46123	Tripp County	South Dakota
46125	Turner County	South Dakota
46127	Union County	South Dakota
46129	Walworth County	South Dakota
46135	Yankton County	South Dakota
46137	Ziebach County	South Dakota
47001	Anderson County	Tennessee
47003	Bedford County	Tennessee
47005	Benton County	Tennessee
47007	Bledsoe County	Tennessee
47009	Blount County	Tennessee
47011	Bradley County	Tennessee
47013	Campbell County	Tennessee
47015	Cannon County	Tennessee
47017	Carroll County	Tennessee
47019	Carter County	Tennessee
47021	Cheatham County	Tennessee
47023	Chester County	Tennessee
47025	Claiborne County	Tennessee
47027	Clay County	Tennessee
47029	Cocke County	Tennessee
47031	Coffee County	Tennessee
47033	Crockett County	Tennessee
47035	Cumberland County	Tennessee
47037	Davidson County	Tennessee
47039	Decatur County	Tennessee
47041	DeKalb County	Tennessee
47043	Dickson County	Tennessee
47045	Dyer County	Tennessee
47047	Fayette County	Tennessee
47049	Fentress County	Tennessee
47051	Franklin County	Tennessee
47053	Gibson County	Tennessee
47055	Giles County	Tennessee
47057	Grainger County	Tennessee
47059	Greene County	Tennessee
47061	Grundy County	Tennessee
47063	Hamblen County	Tennessee
47065	Hamilton County	Tennessee
47067	Hancock County	Tennessee
47069	Hardeman County	Tennessee
47071	Hardin County	Tennessee
47073	Hawkins County	Tennessee
47075	Haywood County	Tennessee
47077	Henderson County	Tennessee
47079	Henry County	Tennessee
47081	Hickman County	Tennessee
47083	Houston County	Tennessee
47085	Humphreys County	Tennessee
47087	Jackson County	Tennessee
47089	Jefferson County	Tennessee
47091	Johnson County	Tennessee
47093	Knox County	Tennessee
47095	Lake County	Tennessee
47097	Lauderdale County	Tennessee
47099	Lawrence County	Tennessee
47101	Lewis County	Tennessee
47103	Lincoln County	Tennessee
47105	Loudon County	Tennessee
47107	McMinn County	Tennessee
47109	McNairy County	Tennessee
47111	Macon County	Tennessee
47113	Madison County	Tennessee
47115	Marion County	Tennessee
47117	Marshall County	Tennessee
47119	Maury County	Tennessee
47121	Meigs County	Tennessee
47123	Monroe County	Tennessee
47125	Montgomery County	Tennessee
47127	Moore County	Tennessee
47129	Morgan County	Tennessee
47131	Obion County	Tennessee
47133	Overton County	Tennessee
47135	Perry County	Tennessee
47137	Pickett County	Tennessee
47139	Polk County	Tennessee
47141	Putnam County	Tennessee
47143	Rhea County	Tennessee
47145	Roane County	Tennessee
47147	Robertson County	Tennessee
47149	Rutherford County	Tennessee
47151	Scott County	Tennessee
47153	Sequatchie County	Tennessee
47155	Sevier County	Tennessee
47157	Shelby County	Tennessee
47159	Smith County	Tennessee
47161	Stewart County	Tennessee
47163	Sullivan County	Tennessee
47165	Sumner County	Tennessee
47167	Tipton County	Tennessee
47169	Trousdale County	Tennessee
47171	Unicoi County	Tennessee
47173	Union County	Tennessee
47175	Van Buren County	Tennessee
47177	Warren County	Tennessee
47179	Washington County	Tennessee
47181	Wayne County	Tennessee
47183	Weakley County	Tennessee
47185	White County	Tennessee
47187	Williamson County	Tennessee
47189	Wilson County	Tennessee
48001	Anderson County	Texas
48003	Andrews County	Texas
48005	Angelina County	Texas
48007	Aransas County	Texas
48009	Archer County	Texas
48011	Armstrong County	Texas
48013	Atascosa County	Texas
48015	Austin County	Texas
48017	Bailey County	Texas
48019	Bandera County	Texas
48021	Bastrop County	Texas
48023	Baylor County	Texas
48025	Bee County	Texas
48027	Bell County	Texas
48029	Bexar County	Texas
48031	Blanco County	Texas
48033	Borden County	Texas
48035	Bosque County	Texas
48037	Bowie County	Texas
48039	Brazoria County	Texas
48041	Brazos County	Texas
48043	Brewster County	Texas
48045	Briscoe County	Texas
48047	Brooks County	Texas
48049	Brown County	Texas
48051	Burleson County	Texas
48053	Burnet County	Texas
48055	Caldwell County	Texas
48057	Calhoun County	Texas
48059	Callahan County	Texas
48061	Cameron County	Texas
48063	Camp County	Texas
48065	Carson County	Texas
48067	Cass County	Texas
48069	Castro County	Texas
48071	Chambers County	Texas
48073	Cherokee County	Texas
48075	Childress County	Texas
48077	Clay County	Texas
48079	Cochran County	Texas
48081	Coke County	Texas
48083	Coleman County	Texas
48085	Collin County	Texas
48087	Collingsworth County	Texas
48089	Colorado County	Texas
48091	Comal County	Texas
48093	Comanche County	Texas
48095	Concho County	Texas
48097	Cooke County	Texas
48099	Coryell County	Texas
48101	Cottle County	Texas
48103	Crane County	Texas
48105	Crockett County	Texas
48107	Crosby County	Texas
48109	Culberson County	Texas
48111	Dallam County	Texas
48113	Dallas County	Texas
48115	Dawson County	Texas
48117	Deaf Smith County	Texas
48119	Delta County	Texas
48121	Denton County	Texas
48123	DeWitt County	Texas
48125	Dickens County	Texas
48127	Dimmit County	Texas
48129	Donley County	Texas
48131	Duval County	Texas
48133	Eastland County	Texas
48135	Ector County	Texas
48137	Edwards County	Texas
48139	Ellis County	Texas
48141	El Paso County	Texas
48143	Erath County	Texas
48145	Falls County	Texas
48147	Fannin County	Texas
48149	Fayette County	Texas
48151	Fisher County	Texas
48153	Floyd County	Texas
48155	Foard County	Texas
48157	Fort Bend County	Texas
48159	Franklin County	Texas
48161	Freestone County	Texas
48163	Frio County	Texas
48165	Gaines County	Texas
48167	Galveston County	Texas
48169	Garza County	Texas
48171	Gillespie County	Texas
48173	Glasscock County	Texas
48175	Goliad County	Texas
48177	Gonzales County	Texas
48179	Gray County	Texas
48181	Grayson County	Texas
48183	Gregg County	Texas
48185	Grimes County	Texas
48187	Guadalupe County	Texas
48189	Hale County	Texas
48191	Hall County	Texas
48193	Hamilton County	Texas
48195	Hansford County	Texas
48197	Hardeman County	Texas
48199	Hardin County	Texas
48201	Harris County	Texas
48203	Harrison County	Texas
48205	Hartley County	Texas
48207	Haskell County	Texas
48209	Hays County	Texas
48211	Hemphill County	Texas
48213	Henderson County	Texas
48215	Hidalgo County	Texas
48217	Hill County	Texas
48219	Hockley County	Texas
48221	Hood County	Texas
48223	Hopkins County	Texas
48225	Houston County	Texas
48227	Howard County	Texas
48229	Hudspeth County	Texas
48231	Hunt County	Texas
48233	Hutchinson County	Texas
48235	Irion County	Texas
48237	Jack County	Texas
48239	Jackson County	Texas
48241	Jasper County	Texas
48243	Jeff Davis County	Texas
48245	Jefferson County	Texas
48247	Jim Hogg County	Texas
48249	Jim Wells County	Texas
48251	Johnson County	Texas
48253	Jones County	Texas
48255	Karnes County	Texas
48257	Kaufman County	Texas
48259	Kendall County	Texas
48261	Kenedy County	Texas
48263	Kent County	Texas
48265	Kerr County	Texas
48267	Kimble County	Texas
48269	King County	Texas
48271	Kinney County	Texas
48273	Kleberg County	Texas
48275	Knox County	Texas
48277	Lamar County	Texas
48279	Lamb County	Texas
48281	Lampasas County	Texas
48283	La Salle County	Texas
48285	Lavaca County	Texas
48287	Lee County	Texas
48289	Leon County	Texas
48291	Liberty County	Texas
48293	Limestone County	Texas
48295	Lipscomb County	Texas
48297	Live Oak County	Texas
48299	Llano County	Texas
48301	Loving County	Texas
48303	Lubbock County	Texas
48305	Lynn County	Texas
48307	McCulloch County	Texas
48309	McLennan County	Texas
48311	McMullen County	Texas
48313	Madison County	Texas
48315	Marion County	Texas
48317	Martin County	Texas
48319	Mason County	Texas
48321	Matagorda County	Texas
48323	Maverick County	Texas
48325	Medina County	Texas
48327	Menard County	Texas
48329	Midland County	Texas
48331	Milam County	Texas
48333	Mills County	Texas
48335	Mitchell County	Texas
48337	Montague County	Texas
48339	Montgomery County	Texas
48341	Moore County	Texas
48343	Morris County	Texas
48345	Motley County	Texas
48347	Nacogdoches County	Texas
48349	Navarro County	Texas
48351	Newton County	Texas
48353	Nolan County	Texas
48355	Nueces County	Texas
48357	Ochiltree County	Texas
48359	Oldham County	Texas
48361	Orange County	Texas
48363	Palo Pinto County	Texas
48365	Panola County	Texas
48367	Parker County	Texas
48369	Parmer County	Texas
48371	Pecos County	Texas
48373	Polk County	Texas
48375	Potter County	Texas
48377	Presidio County	Texas
48379	Rains County	Texas
48381	Randall County	Texas
48383	Reagan County	Texas
48385	Real County	Texas
48387	Red River County	Texas
48389	Reeves County	Texas
48391	Refugio County	Texas
48393	Roberts County	Texas
48395	Robertson County	Texas
48397	Rockwall County	Texas
48399	Runnels County	Texas
48401	Rusk County	Texas
48403	Sabine County	Texas
48405	San Augustine County	Texas
48407	San Jacinto County	Texas
48409	San Patricio County	Texas
48411	San Saba County	Texas
48413	Schleicher County	Texas
48415	Scurry County	Texas
48417	Shackelford County	Texas
48419	Shelby County	Texas
48421	Sherman County	Texas
48423	Smith County	Texas
48425	Somervell County	Texas
48427	Starr County	Texas
48429	Stephens County	Texas
48431	Sterling County	Texas
48433	Stonewall County	Texas
48435	Sutton County	Texas
48437	Swisher County	Texas
48439	Tarrant County	Texas
48441	Taylor County	Texas
48443	Terrell County	Texas
48445	Terry County	Texas
48447	Throckmorton County	Texas
48449	Titus County	Texas
48451	Tom Green County	Texas
48453	Travis County	Texas
48455	Trinity County	Texas
48457	Tyler County	Texas
48459	Upshur County	Texas
48461	Upton County	Texas
48463	Uvalde County	Texas
48465	Val Verde County	Texas
48467	Van Zandt County	Texas
48469	Victoria County	Texas
48471	Walker County	Texas
48473	Waller County	Texas
48475	Ward County	Texas
48477	Washington County	Texas
48479	Webb County	Texas
48481	Wharton County	Texas
48483	Wheeler County	Texas
48485	Wichita County	Texas
48487	Wilbarger County	Texas
48489	Willacy County	Texas
48491	Williamson County	Texas
48493	Wilson County	Texas
48495	Winkler County	Texas
48497	Wise County	Texas
48499	Wood County	Texas
48501	Yoakum County	Texas
48503	Young County	Texas
48505	Zapata County	Texas
48507	Zavala County	Texas
74050	Baker Island (Note: Part of the Minor Outlying Islands. Any recorded population is not permanent, and consists of military or scientific personnel.)	(United States) U.S. Minor Outlying Islands
74100	Howland Island	(United States) U.S. Minor Outlying Islands
74150	Jarvis Island	(United States) U.S. Minor Outlying Islands
74200	Johnston Atoll	(United States) U.S. Minor Outlying Islands
74250	Kingman Reef	(United States) U.S. Minor Outlying Islands
74300	Midway Islands	(United States) U.S. Minor Outlying Islands
74350	Navassa Island	(United States) U.S. Minor Outlying Islands
74400	Palmyra Atoll	(United States) U.S. Minor Outlying Islands
74450	Wake Island	(United States) U.S. Minor Outlying Islands
49001	Beaver County	Utah
49003	Box Elder County	Utah
49005	Cache County	Utah
49007	Carbon County	Utah
49009	Daggett County	Utah
49011	Davis County	Utah
49013	Duchesne County	Utah
49015	Emery County	Utah
49017	Garfield County	Utah
49019	Grand County	Utah
49021	Iron County	Utah
49023	Juab County	Utah
49025	Kane County	Utah
49027	Millard County	Utah
49029	Morgan County	Utah
49031	Piute County	Utah
49033	Rich County	Utah
49035	Salt Lake County	Utah
49037	San Juan County	Utah
49039	Sanpete County	Utah
49041	Sevier County	Utah
49043	Summit County	Utah
49045	Tooele County	Utah
49047	Uintah County	Utah
49049	Utah County	Utah
49051	Wasatch County	Utah
49053	Washington County	Utah
49055	Wayne County	Utah
49057	Weber County	Utah
50001	Addison County	Vermont
50003	Bennington County	Vermont
50005	Caledonia County	Vermont
50007	Chittenden County	Vermont
50009	Essex County	Vermont
50011	Franklin County	Vermont
50013	Grand Isle County	Vermont
50015	Lamoille County	Vermont
50017	Orange County	Vermont
50019	Orleans County	Vermont
50021	Rutland County	Vermont
50023	Washington County	Vermont
50025	Windham County	Vermont
50027	Windsor County	Vermont
78010	Saint Croix Island	(United States Virgin Islands) Virgin Islands (U.S.)
78020	Saint John Island	(United States Virgin Islands) Virgin Islands (U.S.)
78030	Saint Thomas Island	(United States Virgin Islands) Virgin Islands (U.S.)
51001	Accomack County	Virginia
51003	Albemarle County	Virginia
51005	Alleghany County	Virginia
51007	Amelia County	Virginia
51009	Amherst County	Virginia
51011	Appomattox County	Virginia
51013	Arlington County	Virginia
51015	Augusta County	Virginia
51017	Bath County	Virginia
51019	Bedford County (Note: On July 1, 2013, the former independent city of Bedford, Virginia gave up its city charter and became a town within Bedford County. Population estimates are combined totals for the political entities that existed before the merger.)	Virginia
51021	Bland County	Virginia
51023	Botetourt County	Virginia
51025	Brunswick County	Virginia
51027	Buchanan County	Virginia
51029	Buckingham County	Virginia
51031	Campbell County	Virginia
51033	Caroline County	Virginia
51035	Carroll County	Virginia
51036	Charles City County	Virginia
51037	Charlotte County	Virginia
51041	Chesterfield County	Virginia
51043	Clarke County	Virginia
51045	Craig County	Virginia
51047	Culpeper County	Virginia
51049	Cumberland County	Virginia
51051	Dickenson County	Virginia
51053	Dinwiddie County	Virginia
51057	Essex County	Virginia
51059	Fairfax County	Virginia
51061	Fauquier County	Virginia
51063	Floyd County	Virginia
51065	Fluvanna County	Virginia
51067	Franklin County	Virginia
51069	Frederick County	Virginia
51071	Giles County	Virginia
51073	Gloucester County	Virginia
51075	Goochland County	Virginia
51077	Grayson County	Virginia
51079	Greene County	Virginia
51081	Greensville County	Virginia
51083	Halifax County	Virginia
51085	Hanover County	Virginia
51087	Henrico County	Virginia
51089	Henry County	Virginia
51091	Highland County	Virginia
51093	Isle of Wight County	Virginia
51095	James City County	Virginia
51097	King and Queen County	Virginia
51099	King George County	Virginia
51101	King William County	Virginia
51103	Lancaster County	Virginia
51105	Lee County	Virginia
51107	Loudoun County	Virginia
51109	Louisa County	Virginia
51111	Lunenburg County	Virginia
51113	Madison County	Virginia
51115	Mathews County	Virginia
51117	Mecklenburg County	Virginia
51119	Middlesex County	Virginia
51121	Montgomery County	Virginia
51125	Nelson County	Virginia
51127	New Kent County	Virginia
51131	Northampton County	Virginia
51133	Northumberland County	Virginia
51135	Nottoway County	Virginia
51137	Orange County	Virginia
51139	Page County	Virginia
51141	Patrick County	Virginia
51143	Pittsylvania County	Virginia
51145	Powhatan County	Virginia
51147	Prince Edward County	Virginia
51149	Prince George County	Virginia
51153	Prince William County	Virginia
51155	Pulaski County	Virginia
51157	Rappahannock County	Virginia
51159	Richmond County	Virginia
51161	Roanoke County	Virginia
51163	Rockbridge County	Virginia
51165	Rockingham County	Virginia
51167	Russell County	Virginia
51169	Scott County	Virginia
51171	Shenandoah County	Virginia
51173	Smyth County	Virginia
51175	Southampton County	Virginia
51177	Spotsylvania County	Virginia
51179	Stafford County	Virginia
51181	Surry County	Virginia
51183	Sussex County	Virginia
51185	Tazewell County	Virginia
51187	Warren County	Virginia
51191	Washington County	Virginia
51193	Westmoreland County	Virginia
51195	Wise County	Virginia
51197	Wythe County	Virginia
51199	York County	Virginia
51510	Alexandria, City of (Note: One of the 38 independent cities of Virginia.)	Virginia
51520	Bristol, City of	Virginia
51530	Buena Vista, City of	Virginia
51540	Charlottesville, City of	Virginia
51550	Chesapeake, City of	Virginia
51570	Colonial Heights, City of	Virginia
51580	Covington, City of	Virginia
51590	Danville, City of	Virginia
51595	Emporia, City of	Virginia
51600	Fairfax, City of	Virginia
51610	Falls Church, City of	Virginia
51620	Franklin, City of	Virginia
51630	Fredericksburg, City of	Virginia
51640	Galax, City of	Virginia
51650	Hampton, City of	Virginia
51660	Harrisonburg, City of	Virginia
51670	Hopewell, City of	Virginia
51678	Lexington, City of	Virginia
51680	Lynchburg, City of	Virginia
51683	Manassas, City of	Virginia
51685	Manassas Park, City of	Virginia
51690	Martinsville, City of	Virginia
51700	Newport News, City of	Virginia
51710	Norfolk, City of	Virginia
51720	Norton, City of	Virginia
51730	Petersburg, City of	Virginia
51735	Poquoson, City of	Virginia
51740	Portsmouth, City of	Virginia
51750	Radford, City of	Virginia
51760	Richmond, City of	Virginia
51770	Roanoke, City of	Virginia
51775	Salem, City of	Virginia
51790	Staunton, City of	Virginia
51800	Suffolk, City of	Virginia
51810	Virginia Beach, City of	Virginia
51820	Waynesboro, City of	Virginia
51830	Williamsburg, City of	Virginia
51840	Winchester, City of	Virginia
53001	Adams County	(Washington (state)) Washington
53003	Asotin County	(Washington (state)) Washington
53005	Benton County	(Washington (state)) Washington
53007	Chelan County	(Washington (state)) Washington
53009	Clallam County	(Washington (state)) Washington
53011	Clark County	(Washington (state)) Washington
53013	Columbia County	(Washington (state)) Washington
53015	Cowlitz County	(Washington (state)) Washington
53017	Douglas County	(Washington (state)) Washington
53019	Ferry County	(Washington (state)) Washington
53021	Franklin County	(Washington (state)) Washington
53023	Garfield County	(Washington (state)) Washington
53025	Grant County	(Washington (state)) Washington
53027	Grays Harbor County	(Washington (state)) Washington
53029	Island County	(Washington (state)) Washington
53031	Jefferson County	(Washington (state)) Washington
53033	King County	(Washington (state)) Washington
53035	Kitsap County	(Washington (state)) Washington
53037	Kittitas County	(Washington (state)) Washington
53039	Klickitat County	(Washington (state)) Washington
53041	Lewis County	(Washington (state)) Washington
53043	Lincoln County	(Washington (state)) Washington
53045	Mason County	(Washington (state)) Washington
53047	Okanogan County	(Washington (state)) Washington
53049	Pacific County	(Washington (state)) Washington
53051	Pend Oreille County	(Washington (state)) Washington
53053	Pierce County	(Washington (state)) Washington
53055	San Juan County	(Washington (state)) Washington
53057	Skagit County	(Washington (state)) Washington
53059	Skamania County	(Washington (state)) Washington
53061	Snohomish County	(Washington (state)) Washington
53063	Spokane County	(Washington (state)) Washington
53065	Stevens County	(Washington (state)) Washington
53067	Thurston County	(Washington (state)) Washington
53069	Wahkiakum County	(Washington (state)) Washington
53071	Walla Walla County	(Washington (state)) Washington
53073	Whatcom County	(Washington (state)) Washington
53075	Whitman County	(Washington (state)) Washington
53077	Yakima County	(Washington (state)) Washington
54001	Barbour County	West Virginia
54003	Berkeley County	West Virginia
54005	Boone County	West Virginia
54007	Braxton County	West Virginia
54009	Brooke County	West Virginia
54011	Cabell County	West Virginia
54013	Calhoun County	West Virginia
54015	Clay County	West Virginia
54017	Doddridge County	West Virginia
54019	Fayette County	West Virginia
54021	Gilmer County	West Virginia
54023	Grant County	West Virginia
54025	Greenbrier County	West Virginia
54027	Hampshire County	West Virginia
54029	Hancock County	West Virginia
54031	Hardy County	West Virginia
54033	Harrison County	West Virginia
54035	Jackson County	West Virginia
54037	Jefferson County	West Virginia
54039	Kanawha County	West Virginia
54041	Lewis County	West Virginia
54043	Lincoln County	West Virginia
54045	Logan County	West Virginia
54047	McDowell County	West Virginia
54049	Marion County	West Virginia
54051	Marshall County	West Virginia
54053	Mason County	West Virginia
54055	Mercer County	West Virginia
54057	Mineral County	West Virginia
54059	Mingo County	West Virginia
54061	Monongalia County	West Virginia
54063	Monroe County	West Virginia
54065	Morgan County	West Virginia
54067	Nicholas County	West Virginia
54069	Ohio County	West Virginia
54071	Pendleton County	West Virginia
54073	Pleasants County	West Virginia
54075	Pocahontas County	West Virginia
54077	Preston County	West Virginia
54079	Putnam County	West Virginia
54081	Raleigh County	West Virginia
54083	Randolph County	West Virginia
54085	Ritchie County	West Virginia
54087	Roane County	West Virginia
54089	Summers County	West Virginia
54091	Taylor County	West Virginia
54093	Tucker County	West Virginia
54095	Tyler County	West Virginia
54097	Upshur County	West Virginia
54099	Wayne County	West Virginia
54101	Webster County	West Virginia
54103	Wetzel County	West Virginia
54105	Wirt County	West Virginia
54107	Wood County	West Virginia
54109	Wyoming County	West Virginia
55001	Adams County	Wisconsin
55003	Ashland County	Wisconsin
55005	Barron County	Wisconsin
55007	Bayfield County	Wisconsin
55009	Brown County	Wisconsin
55011	Buffalo County	Wisconsin
55013	Burnett County	Wisconsin
55015	Calumet County	Wisconsin
55017	Chippewa County	Wisconsin
55019	Clark County	Wisconsin
55021	Columbia County	Wisconsin
55023	Crawford County	Wisconsin
55025	Dane County	Wisconsin
55027	Dodge County	Wisconsin
55029	Door County	Wisconsin
55031	Douglas County	Wisconsin
55033	Dunn County	Wisconsin
55035	Eau Claire County	Wisconsin
55037	Florence County	Wisconsin
55039	Fond du Lac County	Wisconsin
55041	Forest County	Wisconsin
55043	Grant County	Wisconsin
55045	Green County	Wisconsin
55047	Green Lake County	Wisconsin
55049	Iowa County	Wisconsin
55051	Iron County	Wisconsin
55053	Jackson County	Wisconsin
55055	Jefferson County	Wisconsin
55057	Juneau County	Wisconsin
55059	Kenosha County	Wisconsin
55061	Kewaunee County	Wisconsin
55063	La Crosse County	Wisconsin
55065	Lafayette County	Wisconsin
55067	Langlade County	Wisconsin
55069	Lincoln County	Wisconsin
55071	Manitowoc County	Wisconsin
55073	Marathon County	Wisconsin
55075	Marinette County	Wisconsin
55077	Marquette County	Wisconsin
55078	Menominee County	Wisconsin
55079	Milwaukee County	Wisconsin
55081	Monroe County	Wisconsin
55083	Oconto County	Wisconsin
55085	Oneida County	Wisconsin
55087	Outagamie County	Wisconsin
55089	Ozaukee County	Wisconsin
55091	Pepin County	Wisconsin
55093	Pierce County	Wisconsin
55095	Polk County	Wisconsin
55097	Portage County	Wisconsin
55099	Price County	Wisconsin
55101	Racine County	Wisconsin
55103	Richland County	Wisconsin
55105	Rock County	Wisconsin
55107	Rusk County	Wisconsin
55109	St. Croix County	Wisconsin
55111	Sauk County	Wisconsin
55113	Sawyer County	Wisconsin
55115	Shawano County	Wisconsin
55117	Sheboygan County	Wisconsin
55119	Taylor County	Wisconsin
55121	Trempealeau County	Wisconsin
55123	Vernon County	Wisconsin
55125	Vilas County	Wisconsin
55127	Walworth County	Wisconsin
55129	Washburn County	Wisconsin
55131	Washington County	Wisconsin
55133	Waukesha County	Wisconsin
55135	Waupaca County	Wisconsin
55137	Waushara County	Wisconsin
55139	Winnebago County	Wisconsin
55141	Wood County	Wisconsin
56001	Albany County	Wyoming
56003	Big Horn County	Wyoming
56005	Campbell County	Wyoming
56007	Carbon County	Wyoming
56009	Converse County	Wyoming
56011	Crook County	Wyoming
56013	Fremont County	Wyoming
56015	Goshen County	Wyoming
56017	Hot Springs County	Wyoming
56019	Johnson County	Wyoming
56021	Laramie County	Wyoming
56023	Lincoln County	Wyoming
56025	Natrona County	Wyoming
56027	Niobrara County	Wyoming
56029	Park County	Wyoming
56031	Platte County	Wyoming
56033	Sheridan County	Wyoming
56035	Sublette County	Wyoming
56037	Sweetwater County	Wyoming
56039	Teton County	Wyoming
56041	Uinta County	Wyoming
56043	Washakie County	Wyoming
56045	Weston County	Wyoming

== See also ==
- Outline of the United States
- Index of United States-related articles
- Index of U.S. counties
- Lists of counties in the United States
- List of former United States counties
- List of FIPS state codes
- Statistical area (United States)
  - Combined statistical area (list)
  - Core-based statistical area (list)
    - Metropolitan statistical area (list)
    - Micropolitan statistical area (list)
