= Hobart Bay, Alaska =

- CDP
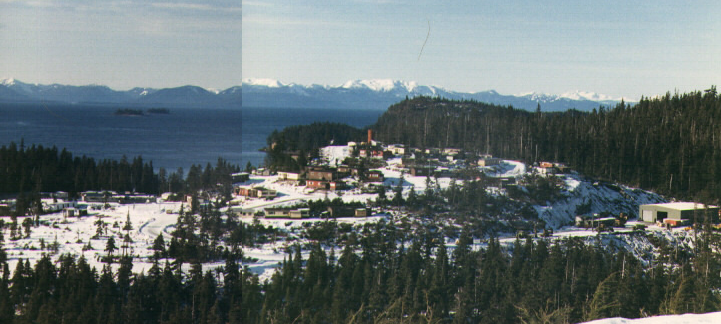
- Aerial view of Hobart Bay

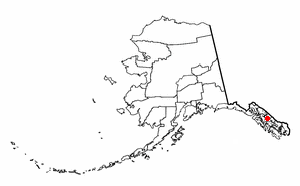
- Location of Hobart Bay within Alaska.
- Coordinates: 57°27′11″N 133°23′36″W
- Country: United States
- State: Alaska
- Borough: Petersburg

Government
  - State senator: Bert Stedman (R)
  - State rep.: Rebecca Himschoot (I)

Area
  - Total: 129.00 sq mi (334.10 km^{2})
  - Land: 119.43 sq mi (309.31 km^{2})
  - Water: 9.57 sq mi (24.79 km^{2})
- Elevation: 1,184 ft (361 m)

Population (2020)
  - Total: 1
  - Density: 0/sq mi (0/km^{2})
- Time zone: UTC-9 (Alaska (AKST))
  - Summer (DST): UTC-8 (AKDT)
- Area code: 907
- FIPS code: 02-32550
- GNIS feature ID: 1866951

Hobart Bay is a census-designated place that was located in Hoonah-Angoon Census Area, Alaska during the 2010 United States census, but is now part of Petersburg Borough. As of the 2020 census, Hobart Bay had a population of 1.

The bay was named in 1889 by Lieutenant Commander Mansfield of the United States Navy. The site was first settled as a logging camp. The population has declined in recent years. Nevertheless, on January 3, 2013, Hobart Bay and a sizable portion of the Hoonah-Angoon Census Area around it were incorporated into the new Petersburg Borough, which has the city of Petersburg as its economic center and is composed primarily of land from the former Petersburg Census Area.

== Geography ==
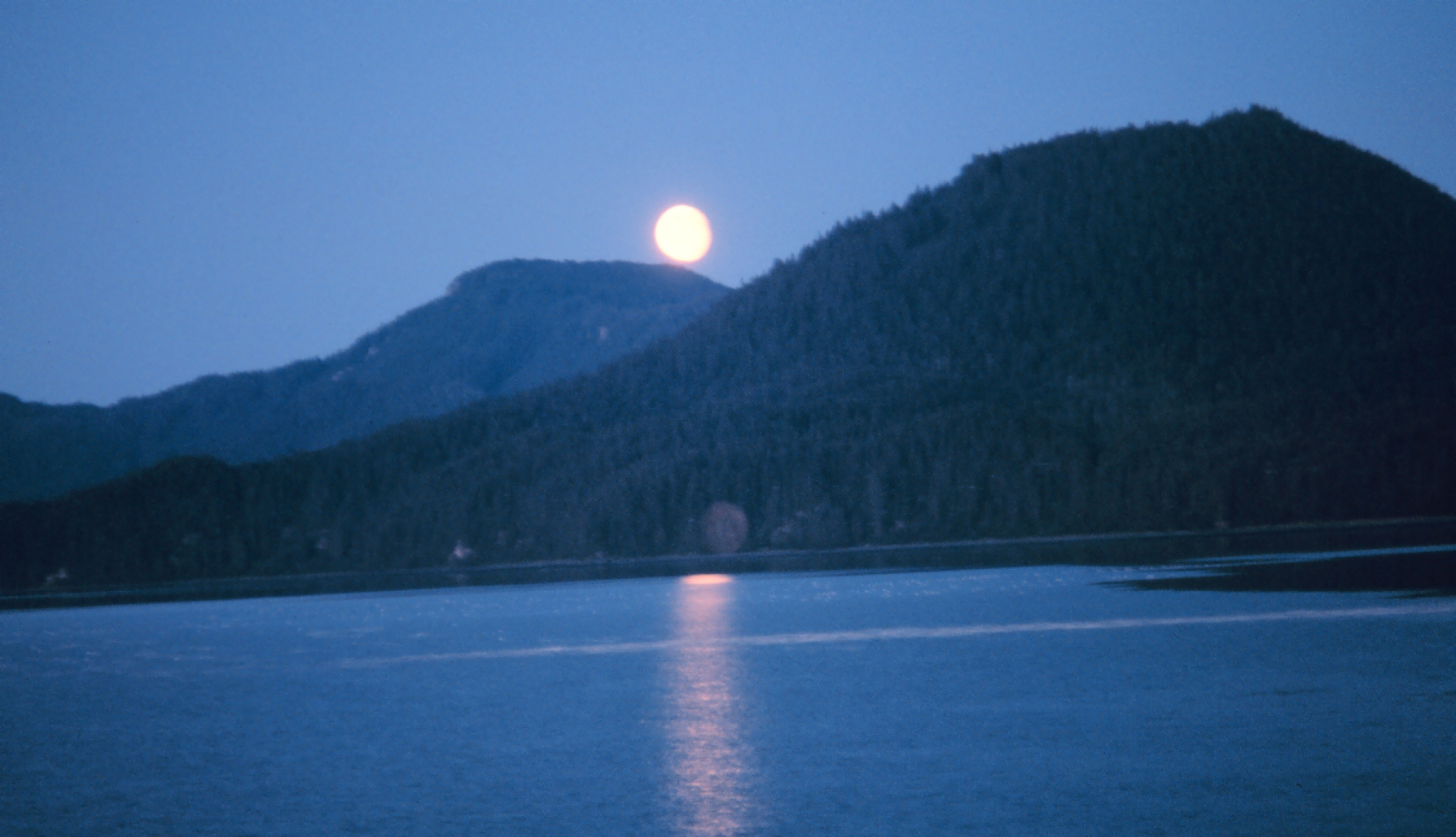
Moonrise on Hobart Bay

Hobart Bay is located at 57°27'11" North, 133°23'36" West (57.453007, -133.393308).

According to the United States Census Bureau, the CDP has a total area of 129.8 square miles (336 km^{2}), of which, 117.4 square miles (304 km^{2}) is land and 12.4 square miles (32 km^{2}) is water. The total area is 9.54% water.

== Demographics ==
Historical population
Census	Pop.	Note	%±
1990	187		—
2000	3		−98.4%
2010	1		−66.7%
2020	1		0.0%

Hobart Bay first appeared on the 1990 U.S. Census as a census-designated place (CDP).

As of the census of 2000, there were three people, two households, and one family residing in the CDP. The population density was 0/km^{2}. There were seventeen housing units at an average density of 0.1 per square mile (0.039/km^{2}). The racial makeup of the CDP was two White and one Native American.

There were two households with no children under the age of eighteen living with them; one was a married couple living together, and one was a male individual.

In the CDP the population was spread out, with two from twenty-five to forty-four and one from forty-five to sixty-four. The median age was forty-four years. There was one female and two males.

The median income for a household in the CDP was $68,750, and the median income for a family was $68,750. The per capita income for the CDP was $34,900.
