= Hood Bay =

Bay in Alaska, United States

- Hoods Bay, Hootz Bay
- Location within Alaska
- Location: Angoon, Alaska
- Coordinates: 57°26′N 134°33′W
- Type: Bay
- Primary inflows: North Arm Hood Bay, South Arm Hood Bay
- Primary outflows: Pacific Ocean
- Max. width: 2 miles (3.2 km)
- Surface elevation: 0 feet (0 m)
- Settlements: Hood Bay, Alaska

Hood Bay (57°26′N 134°33′W), also known as Hoods Bay and Hootz Bay, is an inlet in Alaska, United States. It is situated on the western shore of Admiralty Island in the Alexander Archipelago in Southeast Alaska. Hood Bay is located in the Hoonah–Angoon Census Area 4 miles (6.4 km) south of Angoon, Alaska, and is 2 miles (3.2 km) wide.

== Name ==
Confusion exists over the origin of the bay's name. In 1794, during the Vancouver Expedition, Captain George Vancouver of the British Royal Navy named a bay in the area "Hoods Bay," probably in honor of Admiral Samuel Hood, 1st Viscount Hood. The United States Coast and Geodetic Survey reported in 1883 that the features of the bay thought to be Vancouver's "Hoods Bay" did not match a description provided by a member of Vancouver's party, Lieutenant Joseph Whidbey, of the "Hoods Bay" Vancouver named. In 1899, a Coast and Geodetic Survey chart referred to the bay now known as Hood Bay as "Hootz Bay," a name probably derived from the Tlingit word "khuts" or "huts", which means "bear."

== Estuaries ==
Hood Bay has two estuaries, North Arm Hood Bay and South Arm Hood Bay. North Arm Hood Bay (57°23′N 134°23′W) is a 5-mile (8.0 km) long estuary located at the eastern end of Hood Bay. South Arm Hood Bay (57°22′N 134°24′W) is a 4-mile (6.4 km) long estuary located at the eastern end of Hood Bay, south of North Arm Hood Bay.

== Settlement ==
Hood Bay was a settlement located on the north shore of the bay at 57°23′N 134°24′W, about 10 miles (16 km) southeast of Angoon. It was located where Hood Bay begins and where North Arm Hood Bay and South Arm Hood Bay end. The population of Hood Bay was 50 in 1929. In 1948, a post office was established in the settlement. It was renamed Barge in 1950. In 1952, the Hood Bay post office was reestablished before being discontinued in 1957. In 1966 the settlement was reported to have been abandoned.
