= Petersburg Borough, Alaska =

Borough in Alaska, United States

- Borough
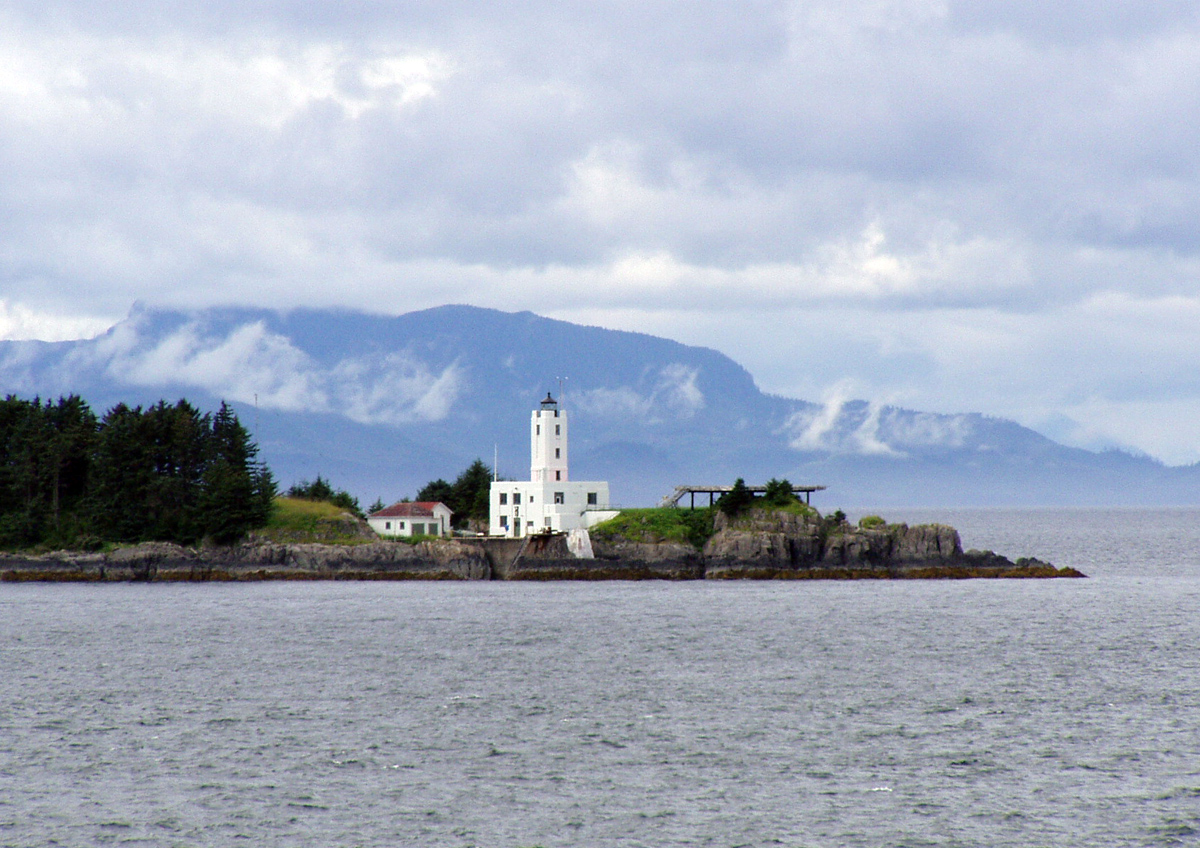
- Five Finger Islands Light

- Location within the U.S. state of Alaska
- Coordinates: 56°48′16″N 132°56′31″W
- Country: United States
- State: Alaska
- Incorporated: January 3, 2013
- Named for: Petersburg
- Seat: Petersburg
- Largest CDP: Petersburg

Area
  - Total: 3,829 sq mi (9,920 km^{2})

Population (2020)
  - Total: 3,398
  - Estimate (2025): 3,394 ▼
  - Density: 0.8874/sq mi (0.3426/km^{2})
- Time zone: UTC−9 (Alaska)
  - Summer (DST): UTC−8 (ADT)
- Congressional district: At-large
- Website: www.petersburgak.gov

Petersburg Borough is a borough in the U.S. state of Alaska. According to the 2020 census, the population was 3,398. The borough seat is Petersburg.

== History ==
When the borough was incorporated in 2013, it took area from the Hoonah-Angoon Census Area and the former Petersburg Census Area. The remaining portion of Petersburg Census Area (including Kake) was added to Prince of Wales-Hyder Census Area. Petersburg Census Area was created in 2008 from the remaining portion of Wrangell-Petersburg Census Area upon the incorporation of the City and Borough of Wrangell.

== Geography ==
Located in central Southeast Alaska, the Petersburg Borough encompasses approximately 3,829 square miles (2,921 square miles of land, 908 square miles of water).

=== Adjacent boroughs and census area ===
- Juneau Borough, Alaska - northwest (quadripoint)
- Wrangell Borough, Alaska - southeast
- Prince of Wales-Hyder Census Area, Alaska - southwest
- Hoonah–Angoon Census Area - north and west
- Regional District of Kitimat-Stikine, British Columbia, Canada - east

== Politics ==
Petersburg is strongly Republican, having last been carried by a Democrat in 1968.

United States presidential election results for Petersburg Borough, Alaska
Year	Republican		Democratic		Third party(ies)	
Year	No.	%	No.	%	No.	%
1960	391	52.41%	355	47.59%	0	0.00%
1964	220	23.23%	727	76.77%	0	0.00%
1968	438	46.70%	447	47.65%	53	5.65%
1972	506	63.09%	254	31.67%	42	5.24%
1976	616	61.54%	332	33.17%	53	5.29%
1980	727	53.42%	395	29.02%	239	17.56%
1984	898	52.64%	774	45.37%	34	1.99%
1988	712	54.10%	562	42.71%	42	3.19%
1992	583	33.37%	578	33.09%	586	33.54%
1996	727	44.79%	584	35.98%	312	19.22%
2000	1,125	63.99%	403	22.92%	230	13.08%
2004	753	59.62%	452	35.79%	58	4.59%
2008	963	55.96%	704	40.91%	54	3.14%
2012	867	50.12%	777	44.91%	86	4.97%
2016	928	53.70%	577	33.39%	223	12.91%
2020	1,002	62.31%	534	33.21%	72	4.48%
2024	970	57.13%	640	37.69%	88	5.18%

== Demographics ==
Historical population
Census	Pop.	Note	%±
2010	3,815		—
2020	3,398		−10.9%
2025 (est.)	3,394	▼	−0.1%
U.S. Decennial Census

=== 2020 census ===
As of the 2020 census, the borough had a population of 3,398 and a population density of 0.89 per square mile (0.34/km^{2}). There were 1,718 housing units across the borough.

The median age was 42.1 years, 21.0% of residents were under the age of 18, and 21.0% were 65 years of age or older. For every 100 females there were 108.6 males, and for every 100 females age 18 and over there were 111.8 males age 18 and over.

There were 1,367 households in the borough, of which 30.3% had children under the age of 18 living with them and 20.3% had a female householder with no spouse or partner present. About 27.3% of all households were made up of individuals and 12.7% had someone living alone who was 65 years of age or older. Among occupied housing units, 71.1% were owner-occupied and 28.9% were renter-occupied. The homeowner vacancy rate was 2.5% and the rental vacancy rate was 9.3%.

0.0% of residents lived in urban areas, while 100.0% lived in rural areas.

The racial makeup of the borough was 72.7% White, 1.4% Black or African American, 7.3% Native American, 3.6% Asian, 0.4% Native Hawaiian and Pacific Islander, 1.8% from some other race, and 12.8% from two or more races. Hispanic or Latino residents of any race comprised 4.8% of the population. In absolute terms there were 2,870 White, 92 Black or African American, 483 Native American, 209 Asian, 58 Pacific Islander, and 206 from other races, with 164 Hispanic or Latino residents of any race.

The most reported ancestries in 2020 were:

- English (15.5%)
- German (15.3%)
- Norwegian (13.2%)
- Irish (12.3%)
- Tlingit (6.5%)
- Scottish (4.8%)
- Swedish (3.8%)
- Mexican (3%)
- Filipino (2.5%)
- French (2.5%)

=== Racial and ethnic composition ===
Petersburg Borough, Alaska – Racial and ethnic composition Note: the US Census treats Hispanic/Latino as an ethnic category. This table excludes Latinos from the racial categories and assigns them to a separate category. Hispanics/Latinos may be of any race.
Race / Ethnicity (NH = Non-Hispanic)	Pop 2010	Pop 2020	% 2010	% 2020
White alone (NH)	2,649	2,444	69.44%	71.92%
Black or African American alone (NH)	15	46	0.39%	1.35%
Native American or Alaska Native alone (NH)	603	231	15.81%	6.80%
Asian alone (NH)	96	117	2.52%	3.44%
Native Hawaiian or Pacific Islander alone (NH)	6	12	0.16%	0.35%
Other race alone (NH)	13	21	0.34%	0.62%
Mixed race or Multiracial (NH)	303	363	7.94%	10.68%
Hispanic or Latino (any race)	130	164	3.41%	4.83%
Total	3,815	3,398	100.00%	100.00%

== Communities ==
=== City ===
- Kupreanof

=== Census-designated places ===
- Hobart Bay
- Petersburg (borough seat)

=== Census Subareas ===
- Petersburg

== See also ==
- List of boroughs in Alaska
