= Gulf of Alaska =

Arm of the Pacific Ocean

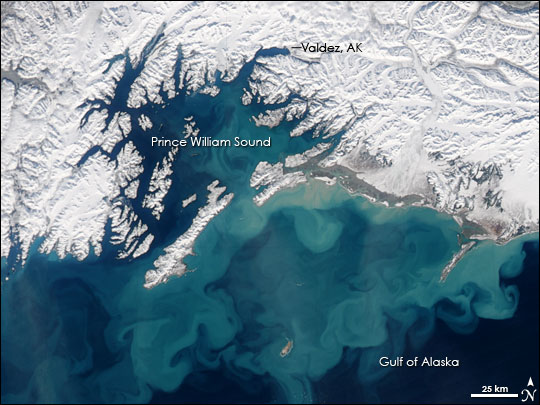
- A view of the Gulf of Alaska from space, showing swirling sediment in the waters

- Location within Alaska
- Location: South shore of Alaska
- Coordinates: 58.6°N 145.2°W
- Type: Gulf
- Part of: North Pacific Ocean
- River sources: Susitna River
- Ocean/sea sources: Pacific Ocean
- Basin countries: United States
- Surface area: 1,533,000 km^{2} (592,000 sq mi)
- Islands: Kodiak Archipelago, Montague Island, Middleton Island
- Settlements: Valdez, Anchorage, Seward

The Gulf of Alaska (Tlingit: Yéil T'ooch’) is an arm of the Pacific Ocean defined by the curve of the southern coast of Alaska, stretching from Kabuch Point in the Alaska Peninsula and Kodiak Island in the west to the Cape Spencer in the east, where Glacier Bay is found and start the Inside Passage (Coastal Waters of Southeast Alaska and British Columbia).

The Gulf shoreline is a combination of forest, mountain and a number of tidewater glaciers. Alaska's largest glaciers, the Malaspina Glacier and Bering Glacier, spill out onto the coastal line along the Gulf of Alaska. The coast is heavily indented with Cook Inlet and Prince William Sound, the two largest connected bodies of water. It includes Yakutat Bay. Lituya Bay (a fjord north of Cross Sound, and south of Mount Fairweather) is the site of the largest recorded tsunami in history. It serves as a sheltered anchorage for fishing boats.

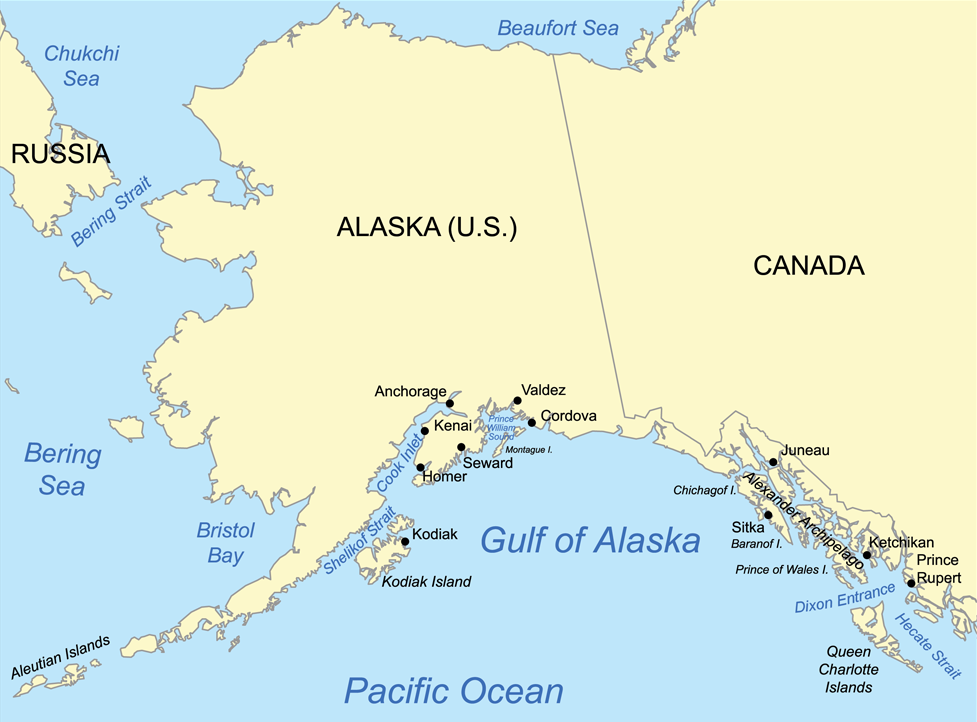
The Gulf of Alaska

The Gulf of Alaska is considered a Class I, productive ecosystem with more than 300 grams of carbon per square meter per year based on SeaWiFS data.

Deep water corals can be found in the Gulf of Alaska. Primnoa pacifica has contributed to the location being labeled as Habitat Areas of Particular Concern. P. pacifica is a deep water coral typically found between 150 metres (490 ft) and 900 metres (3,000 ft) here.

Due to the North Pacific Current, which is in turn fed by the warm Kuroshio Current, the Gulf of Alaska remains ice-free throughout the year. In 1977, the Gulf of Alaska started to manifest an unexpected and at that time inexplicable shift on its normal climate regime, resulting in a growth of the mean temperature of the sea surface and in an increased availability and variety of commercial fish species. A similar volatile climate change was observed during the 1970s in the North Pacific seas.

== Meteorology ==
The Gulf is a great generator of storms. In addition to dumping vast quantities of snow and ice on southern Alaska, resulting in some of the largest concentrations south of the Arctic Circle, many of the storms move south along the coasts of British Columbia, Washington, Oregon, and as far south as Southern California (primarily during El Niño events). Much of the seasonal rainfall and snowfall in the Pacific Northwest and Southwestern United States comes from the Gulf of Alaska.

== Extent ==
The International Hydrographic Organization defines the limits of the Gulf of Alaska as follows:

On the north. The coast of Alaska.

On the south. A line drawn from Cape Spencer, the northern limit of the Coastal Waters of Southeast Alaska and British Columbia to Kabuch Point, the southeast limit of the Bering Sea, in such a way that all the adjacent islands are included in the Gulf of Alaska.

The US Geological Survey's Geographic Names Information System database defines the Gulf of Alaska as bounded on the north by the coast of Alaska and on the south by a line running from the south end of Kodiak Island on the west to Dixon Entrance on the east.

== Islands ==
- Admiralty Island
- Spain Island
- Aghiyuk Island
- Aiaktalik Island
- Akun Island
- Akutan Island
- Aleutika Island
- Amaknak Island
- Adronica Island
- Annette Island
- Anyaka Island
- Ariadne Island
- Augustine Island
- Avatanak Island
- Baker Island
- Ban Island
- Baranof Island
- Beautiful Isle
- Bell Island
- Benjamin Island
- Biorka Island
- Bligh Island
- Chat Island
- Chenega Island
- Chichagof Island
- Chisik Island
- Chiswell Island(s)
- Chowiet Island
- Coronation Island
- Cronin Island
- Culross Island
- Dall Island
- Deer Island
- Doggie Island
- Dolgoi Island
- Douglas Island
- Duke Island
- East Chugach Island
- Egg Island
- Egg Island(s)
- Eldred Rock
- Eleanor Island
- Elizabeth Island
- Erlington Island
- Esther Island
- Etolin Island
- Fish Island
- Fitzgerald Island
- Forrester Island
- Goloi Island
- Granite Island
- Gravina Island
- Green Island
- Gregson Island
- Gull Island
- Haenke Island
- Harbor Island
- Hawkins Island
- Heceta Island
- Herring Island(s)
- Hesketh Island
- Hinchinbrook Island
- Kalgin Island
- Kanak Island
- Karpa Island
- Kataguni Island
- Kayak Island
- Khantaak Island
- Knight Island
- Kodiak Island
- Korovin Island
- Kosciusko Island
- Kriwoi Island
- Kruzof Island
- Kuiu Island
- Kupreanof Island
- Latouche Island
- Lemesurier Island
- Lincoln Island
- Lone Island
- Long Island
- Lulu Island
- Lynn Brothers
- Ma Relle Island(s)
- Mab Island
- Marmot Island
- Mitkof Island
- Montague Island
- Nakchamik Island
- Naked Island
- Near Island
- Noyes Island
- Nuka Island
- Osier Island
- Otmeloi Island
- Outer Island
- Partofshikof Island
- Pearl Island
- Perry Island
- Pleasant Island
- Popof Island
- Powder Island
- Prince of Wales Island
- Rabbit Island
- Ragged Island
- Rugged Island
- Raspberry Island
- Revillagigedo Island
- Rootok Island
- San Fernando Island
- San Juan Island
- Sebree Island
- Sentinel Island
- Shelter Island
- Shikosi Island
- Shuyak Island
- Sinith Island(s)
- Sitkalidak Island
- Sitkinak Island
- Spruce Island
- Strawberry Island
- Suemez Island
- Sullivan Island
- Sutwik Island
- Talsani Island
- Tanker Island
- Tigalda Island
- Tugidak Island
- Twoheaded Island
- Uganik Island
- Unalaska Island
- Unalga Island
- Unavikshak Island
- Unga Island
- Warren Island
- Whale Island
- Wingham Island
- Wooded Island(s)
- Woronkofski Island
- Wrangell Island
- Yakobi Island
- Yukon Island
- Zarembo Island
