= List of islands of the United States by area =

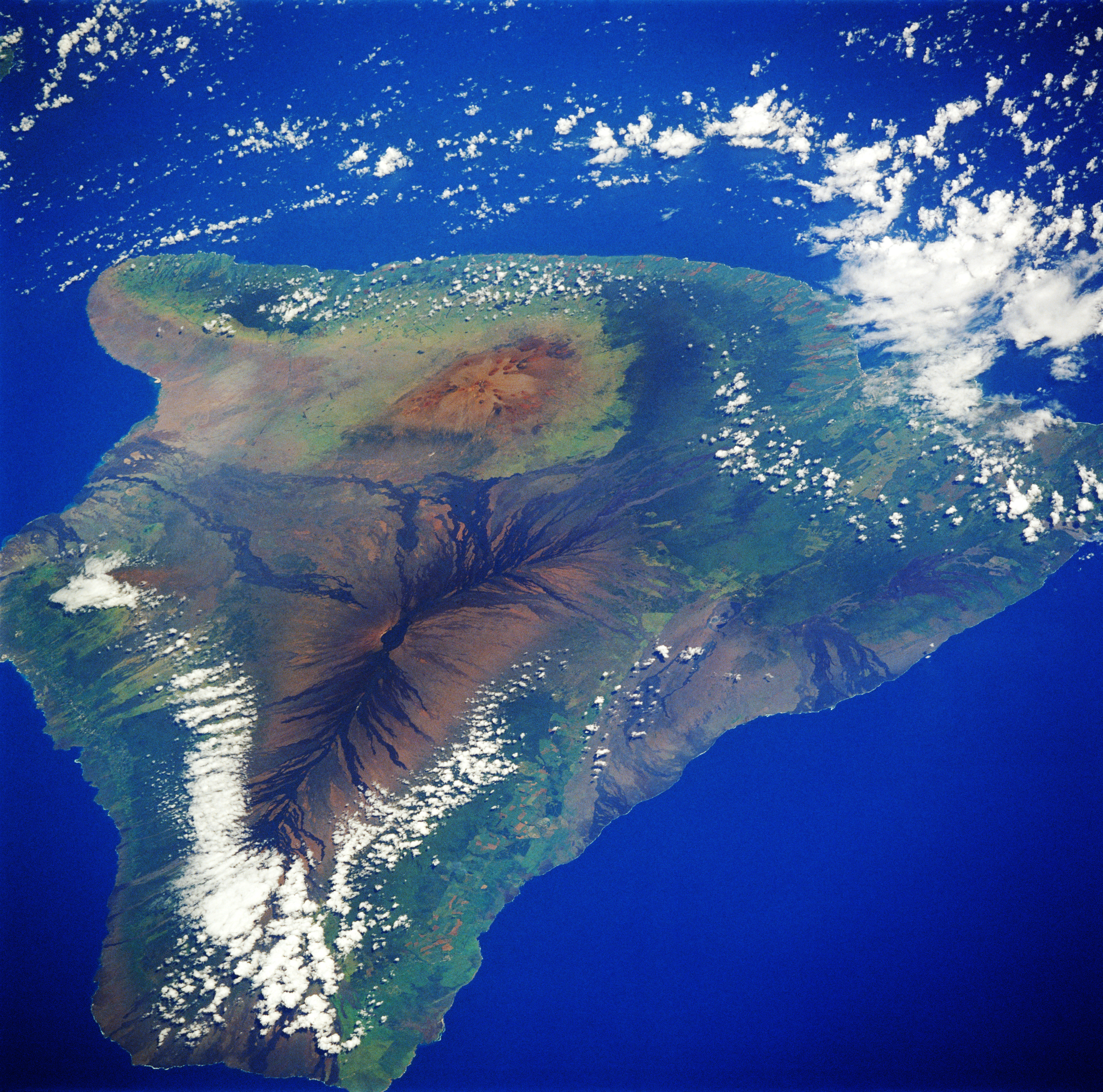
Satellite image of the Big Island of Hawaiʻi, the largest island in the United States.

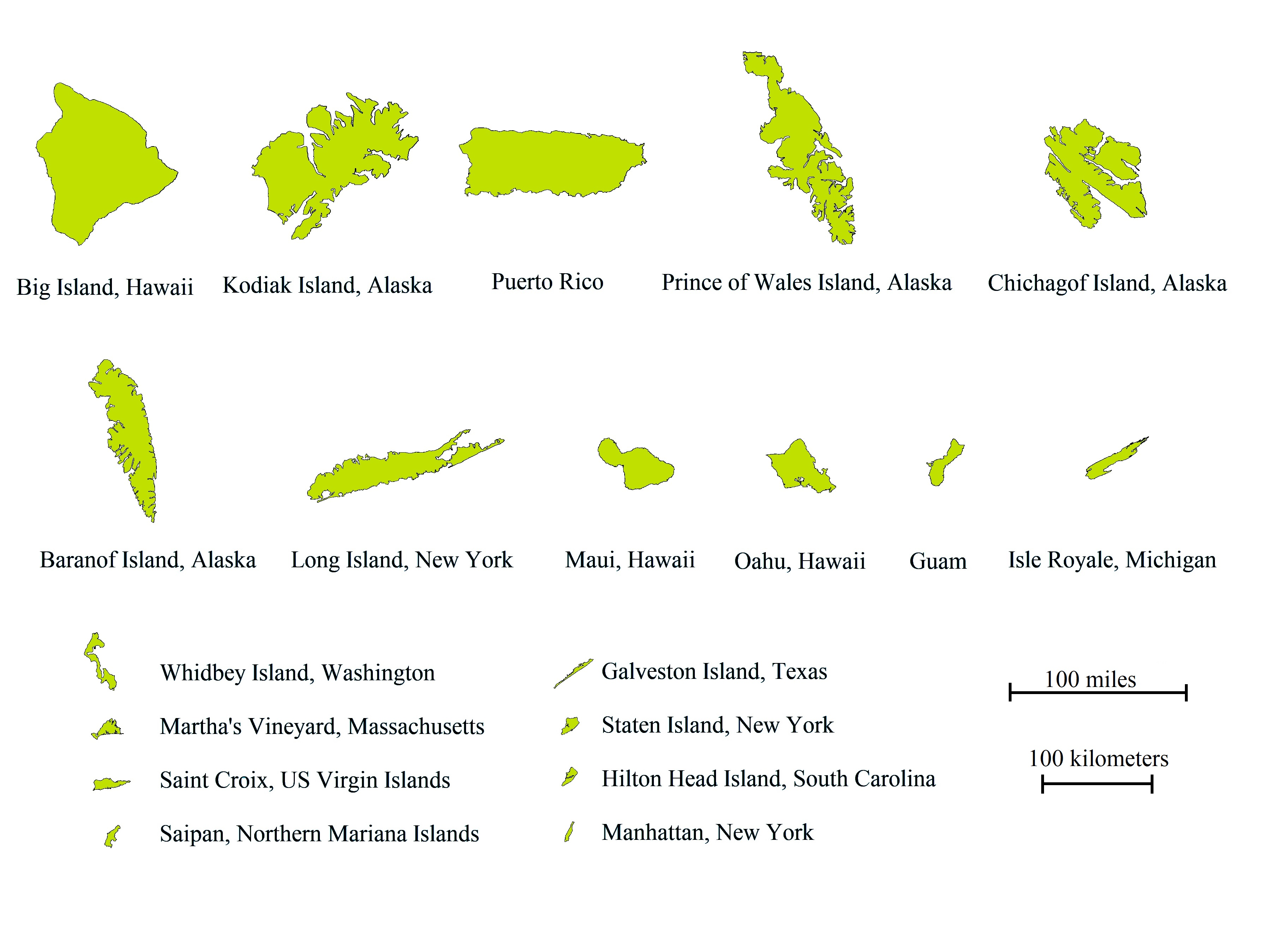
Scale depiction of the five largest islands in the United States, with some other significant islands

This is a list of islands of the United States, as ordered by area. It includes most islands with an area greater than 20 square miles (approximately 52 km^{2}). Mainland areas cut by human-made canals are not considered islands.

== Islands over 75 square miles (190 km^{2}) ==
† Signifies the largest island in the state or territory

Rank	Name	Area (sq mi)	Area (km^{2})	Location	Population (2020)
1	Hawaiʻi †	4,028	10,433	Hawaii	200,629
2	Kodiak Island †	3,588	9,293	Alaska	12,932
3	Puerto Rico †	3,513	9,100	Puerto Rico	3,275,833
4	Prince of Wales Island	2,577	6,675	Alaska	5,559
5	Chichagof Island	2,080	5,388	Alaska	1,342
6	St. Lawrence Island	1,983	5,135	Alaska	1,352
7	Admiralty Island	1,684	4,362	Alaska	650
8	Nunivak Island	1,625	4,209	Alaska	191
9	Unimak Island	1,590	4,119	Alaska	35
10	Baranof Island	1,570	4,065	Alaska	8,532
11	Long Island †	1,401	3,629	New York	7,568,304
12	Revillagigedo Island	1,145	2,965	Alaska	13,477
13	Kupreanof Island	1,086	2,813	Alaska	584
14	Unalaska Island	1,051	2,722	Alaska	1,759
15	Nelson Island	843	2,183	Alaska	1,197
16	Kuiu Island	758	1,962	Alaska	10
17	Maui	727	1,883	Hawaii	154,100
18	Afognak	698	1,809	Alaska	169
19	Umnak	692	1,793	Alaska	39
20	Oʻahu	597	1,545	Hawaii	1,016,508
21	Kauaʻi	552	1,430	Hawaii	73,214
22	Atka Island	410	1,061	Alaska	61
23	Attu Island	346	896	Alaska	0
24	Etolin Island	336	870	Alaska	15
25	Montague Island	305	790	Alaska	0
26	Adak Island	280	725	Alaska	326
27	Molokaʻi	260	673	Hawaii	7,369
28	Dall Island	253	655	Alaska	20
29	Wrangell Island	216	560	Alaska	2,401
30	Mitkof Island	211	546	Alaska	3,364
31	Padre Island †	209	542	Texas	2,816
32	Guam †	209	541	Guam	154,805
33	Isle Royale †	206	534	Michigan	0
34	Tanaga Island	204	529	Alaska	0
35	Zarembo Island	185	478	Alaska	0
36	Unga Island	177	461	Alaska	0
37	Amlia	176	459	Alaska	0
38	Hinchinbrook Island	170	445	Alaska	5
39	Kosciusko Island	169	438	Alaska	52
40	Whidbey Island †	169	437	Washington	58,211
41	Kruzof Island	168	435	Alaska	0
42	Kanaga Island	142	369	Alaska	0
43	Lānaʻi	141	364	Hawaii	3,367
44	St. Matthew Island	137	354	Alaska	0
45	Annette Island	132	342	Alaska	1,447
46	Akutan Island	129	334	Alaska	713
47	Drummond Island	125	324	Michigan	1,058
48	Hagemeister Island	120	312	Alaska	0
49	Nagai Island	120	310	Alaska	0
50	Amchitka	119	309	Alaska	0
51	Sitkalidak Island	119	309	Alaska	0
52	Mount Desert Island †	108	280	Maine	10,424
53	Kiska	107	278	Alaska	0
54	Knight Island	101	260	Alaska	0
55	Marsh Island †	100	259	Louisiana	0
56	Santa Cruz Island †	98	254	California	2
57	Gravina Island	95	245	Alaska	50
58	Martha's Vineyard †	91	236	Massachusetts	14,901
59	Agattu	90	234	Alaska	0
60	Semisopochnoi Island	86	224	Alaska	0
61	Johns Island †	84	217	South Carolina	11,477
62	Seguam Island	83	215	Alaska	1
63	Saint Croix †	84	212	U.S. Virgin Islands	53,234
64	Yakobi Island	82	212	Alaska	0
65	Santa Rosa Island	81	209	California	2
66	Raspberry Island	77	200	Alaska	2
67	Douglas Island	77	199	Alaska	5,297
68	Santa Catalina Island	75	194	California	3,696

== Islands 5–75 square miles (13–194 km^{2}) ==
This section of the list is not complete, although it should cover most of the islands in the United States over 20 square miles (52 km^{2}).

Island's Name	Area (sq mi)	Area (km^{2})	Location	Population	Density (per km^{2})
Heceta Island	70	181	Alaska	14	0.08
Niʻihau	70	180	Hawaii	160	0.9
Saipan	69	180	Northern Mariana Islands	62,392	346
Tugidak Island	69	180	Alaska	0	0
Edisto Island	68	176	South Carolina	2,301	13
Hawkins Island	67	175	Alaska	4	0.023
Yunaska Island	67	172	Alaska	0	0
Sitkinak Island	65	169	Alaska	0	0
Akun Island	65	168	Alaska	0	0
Shuyak Island	65	168	Alaska	0	0
Chuginadak Island	65	167	Alaska	0	0
Sukkwan Island	65	167	Alaska	9	0.05
Galveston Island	64	166	Texas	58,175	350
Matagorda Island	61	157	Texas	0	0
Great Sitkin Island	60	156	Alaska	0	0
Staten Island	59	153	New York	443,728	2,900
Deer Island	58	152	Alaska	0	0
Duke Island	57	149	Alaska	0	0
Orcas Island	57	148	Washington	4,453	30.1
Cumberland Island	57	147	Georgia	0	0
San Clemente Island	57	147	California	0	0
Uganik Island	57	147	Alaska	0	0
St. Michael Island	56	145	Alaska	915	6.3
Stuart Island	56	145	Alaska	0	0
Hilton Head Island	55	144	South Carolina	33,862	235
Beaver Island	55	144	Michigan	551	3.8
San Juan Island	55	143	Washington	6,822	47.7
Suemez Island	52	135	Alaska	0	0
Tutuila	52	135	American Samoa	55,876	413.9
Esther Island	52	133	Alaska	31	0.23
Vieques	51	132	Puerto Rico	9,106	69
Sanak Island	50	128	Alaska	0	0
Sugar Island	49	128	Michigan	652	5
Bois Blanc Island	49	127	Michigan	71	0.56
Nantucket	48	124	Massachusetts	9,520	76.7
Davis Island	46	120	Louisiana Mississippi	0	0
Kagalaska Island	45	116	Alaska	0	0
Kahoʻolawe	45	116	Hawaii	0	0
Long Island	45	115	Alaska	0	0
Chirikof Island	44	115	Alaska	0	0
Wadmalaw Island	42	109	South Carolina	2,611	23.9
Antelope Island	42	109	Utah	0	0
Dolgoi Island	41	107	Alaska	0	0
Fidalgo Island	41	107	Washington	20,700	193
Baker Island	41	105	Alaska	0	0
Camano Island	40	105	Washington	13,358	127
Saint Paul Island	40	104	Alaska	532	5
Sedanka Island	40	103	Alaska	0	0
Deer Isle	<40	<102	Maine	<3,028	29
Tinian	39	102	Northern Mariana Islands	3,540	34.7
Aquidneck Island/Rhode Island	38	98	Rhode Island	60,870	621
Vashon Island	37	96	Washington	10,123	105
Tigalda Island	35	91	Alaska	0	0
Saint George Island	35	90	Alaska	100	1.1
Catherine Island	34	87	Alaska	0	0
Hatteras Island	34	86	North Carolina	4,001	46.5
Rota	33	85	Northern Mariana Islands	2,477	29
Sauvie Island	33	85	Oregon	1,078	12.7
Grand Isle	32	82	Vermont	3,651	44.5
Kent Island	32	82	Maryland	16,812	205
Pine Island	32	82	Florida	8,235	100
Saint Thomas	32	81	U.S. Virgin Islands	51,181	632
Coronation Island	30	78	Alaska	0	0
Lopez Island	30	77	Washington	2,177	28
Grand Island	29	73	New York	18,621	255
Bainbridge Island	28	72	Washington	20,308	282
Gareloi Island	26	67	Alaska	0	0
Little Sitkin Island	24.0	62.1	Alaska	0	0
Madeline Island	24	62	Wisconsin	246	3.9
Washington Island	24	61	Wisconsin	600	9.8
Assateague Island	24.4	63	Maryland Virginia	0	0
Vinalhaven Island	23	61	Maine	1,235	20
Manhattan	23	60	New York	1,537,195	25,619
San Nicolas Island	23	59	California	0	0
Alameda Island	23	59	California	73,812	1,251
Marquette Island	23	59	Michigan	0	0
Woronkofski Island	23	59	Alaska	0	0
Grand Island	22	58	Michigan	45	0.8
North Manitou Island	22	58	Michigan	0	0
Neebish Island	22	56	Michigan	66	1.2
Mon Louis Island	21.3	55.3	Alabama		
Oak Island	21	53	North Carolina	8,386	158
Tuxekan Island	20	53	Alaska	0	0
Saint John	20	51	U.S. Virgin Islands	4,007	78
St. Vincent Island	19.5	50.5	Florida	0	0
Harstine Island	18.65	48.3	Washington	1,412	29.4
Amelia Island	18.2	47.1	Florida	10,716	228
Pagan	18	47	Northern Mariana Islands	7	0.15
Roanoke Island	17.95	46.5	North Carolina	6,724	144
Georgetown Island	17.4	45.0	Maine	1,058	23.5
Santa Rosa Island	17.2	44.6	Florida		
Taʻū	17.11	44.31	American Samoa	790	17.8
Agrihan	17.01	44.05	Northern Mariana Islands	0	0
Sanibel Island	16.18	41.90	Florida	6,382	152
Stockton Island	15.5	40	Wisconsin	0	0
Key Largo	15.25	39.49	Florida	12,447	315
Fenwick Island	15	38	Delaware Maryland	8,002	210.5
San Miguel Island	15	38	California	0	0
Anatahan	13.09	33.91	Northern Mariana Islands	0	0
Wellesley Island	13	33	New York	368	11
Segula Island	12.96	33.58	Alaska	0	0
Islesboro Island	12.4	32.1	Maine	583	18.2
Outer Island	12.3	31.8	Wisconsin	0	0
Shelter Island	12.19	31.58	New York	2,413	76.4
Marco Island	12.1	31.5	Florida	15,760	500
St. George Island	11.7	30.3	Florida	990	32.7
Culebra	11.64	30.1	Puerto Rico	1,314	42.5
North Haven	11.6	30.1	Maine	417	13.9
Bogue Banks	11.3	29.1	North Carolina	~6,600	~22
Kiawah Island	11.17	28.93	South Carolina	1,769	61.1
Swan's Island	10.9	28.4	Maine	355	12.5
Mockhorn Island	10.9	28.3	Virginia	0	0
Hawadax Island	10.72	27.8	Alaska	0	0
Isle au Haut	10.7	27.6	Maine	92	3.3
Marsh Island	10.2	26.4	Maine	~7,000	265
Grosse Ile	9.6	24.9	Michigan	10,894	438
Sebascodegan Island	9.6	24.8	Maine	<5,000	<200
Conanicut Island	9.4	25.1	Rhode Island	5,622	224
Lummi Island	9.25	24	Washington	822	351
Block Island	9	25	Rhode Island	1,051	42
Westport Island	8.81	22.82	Maine	719	31.5
Cypress Island	8.6	22.3	Washington	40	1.8
Guemes Island	8.6	22.3	Washington	605	27
Ocracoke Island	8.6	22.3	North Carolina	797	35.7
Grindstone Island	8.5	22.1	New York	~20-700	~0.9-32
Absecon Island	8.2	21.2	New Jersey	57,457	2,710
Grand Isle	8.17	21.17	Louisiana	1,005	47.5
South Manitou Island	8	21	Michigan	0	0
Oak Island	7.9	20.3	Wisconsin	0	0
Garden Island	7.8	20.2	Michigan	0	0
Anderson Island	7.75	20.1	Washington	1,037	51.6
Arrowsic Island	7.75	20.07	Maine	477	23.8
Shaw Island	7.7	20	Washington	240	12
Bulls Island	7.66	19.8	South Carolina	0	0
Puget Island	7.5	19.4	Washington	831	42.8
Buldir Island	7.45	19.3	Alaska	0	0
Naushon Island	7.4	19	Massachusetts	30	1.57
Mercer Island	7	17	Washington	22,036	1,296
McNeil Island	6.63	17.2	Washington	214	12.4
Grahams Island	6.63	17.18	North Dakota		
Sugar Island	6.575	17.03	Maine	0	0
Blakely Island	6.5	16.9	Washington	56	3.3
Chincoteague Island	6.41	16.6	Virginia	2,875	449
Marrowstone Island	6.3	16.4	Washington	844	51.5
Dauphin Island	6.26	16.2	Alabama	1,371	84.6
Verona Island	6.24	16.16	Maine	507	31.4
Hall Island (Alaska)	6.2	16.06	Alaska	0	0
Shemya	5.9	15.3	Alaska	0	0
Prudence Island	5.57	14.43	Rhode Island	278	19.3
South Core Banks	5.5	14.2	North Carolina	0	0
High Island (Michigan)	5.5	14.1	Michigan	0	0
South Fox Island	5.4	13.9	Michigan	0	0
Blakeley Island	5.36	13.88	Alabama		
Wallops Island	5.24	13.6	Virginia		
Fox Island	5.2	13.5	Washington	3,921	290
Gardiners Island	5.184	13.43	New York	0	0

== See also ==
- List of islands by area
- List of islands of the United States
