= Cordova Bay =

Bay in the Alexander Archipelago of Alaska

Coordinates: 54°51′03″N 132°33′59″W

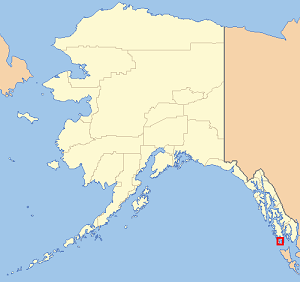
Cordova Bay is at the southern end of the Alexander Archipelago in the Alaska Panhandle

Cordova Bay is a bay in the Alexander Archipelago of southeast Alaska. It opens onto Dixon Entrance to the south, between Cape Muzon on Dall Island and Point Marsh (a group of small islets just off Prince of Wales Island). The name Puerto Cordova y Cordova was given by the Spanish explorer Lieutenant Don Jacinto Caamaño in 1792, in honor of Admiral Luis de Córdova y Córdova. The name was published by George Vancouver in 1798.

Cordova Bay is bordered on the west by Dall Island, Long Island, Tlevak Strait, and Sukkwan Island, and on the east by Prince of Wales Island. Cordova Bay extends north and west from its mouth to Lime Point, where it connects with Hetta Inlet. The Coast Survey lists the length as about 19 nautical miles (22 mi; 35 km) from a point between the SE corner of Long Island and Dewey Rocks to Lime Point and an average width of about 3 nautical miles (3.5 mi; 5.6 km) from Ship Islands to Lime Point. Hetta Inlet extends a further 15 nautical miles (17 mi; 28 km) north, and then turns east for about 3 nautical miles (3.5 mi; 5.6 km). Gould Island almost closes the inlet shortly after it turns east, above this point the inlet is accessible only to small craft. Portage Bay is the portion of the inlet above Gould Island; a portage road (Sulzer Portage) connects it with Cholmondelay Sound.

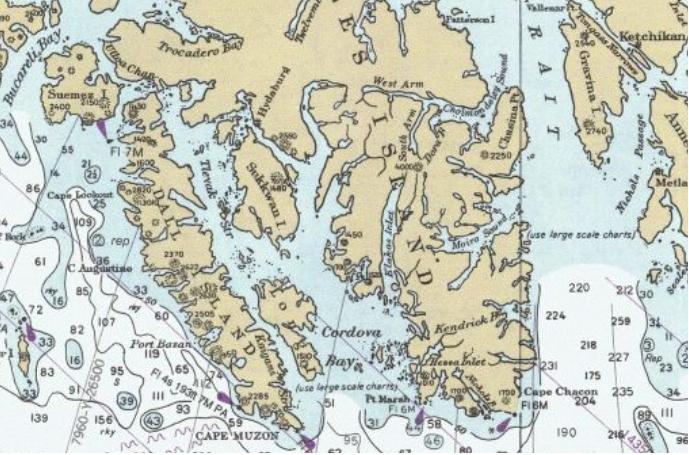
Cordova Bay lies between Prince of Wales Island on the east and Dall Island, Long Island, and Sukkwan Islands on the west. US Coast Survey chart detail. Click through to the Commons page to view annotations including village sites.

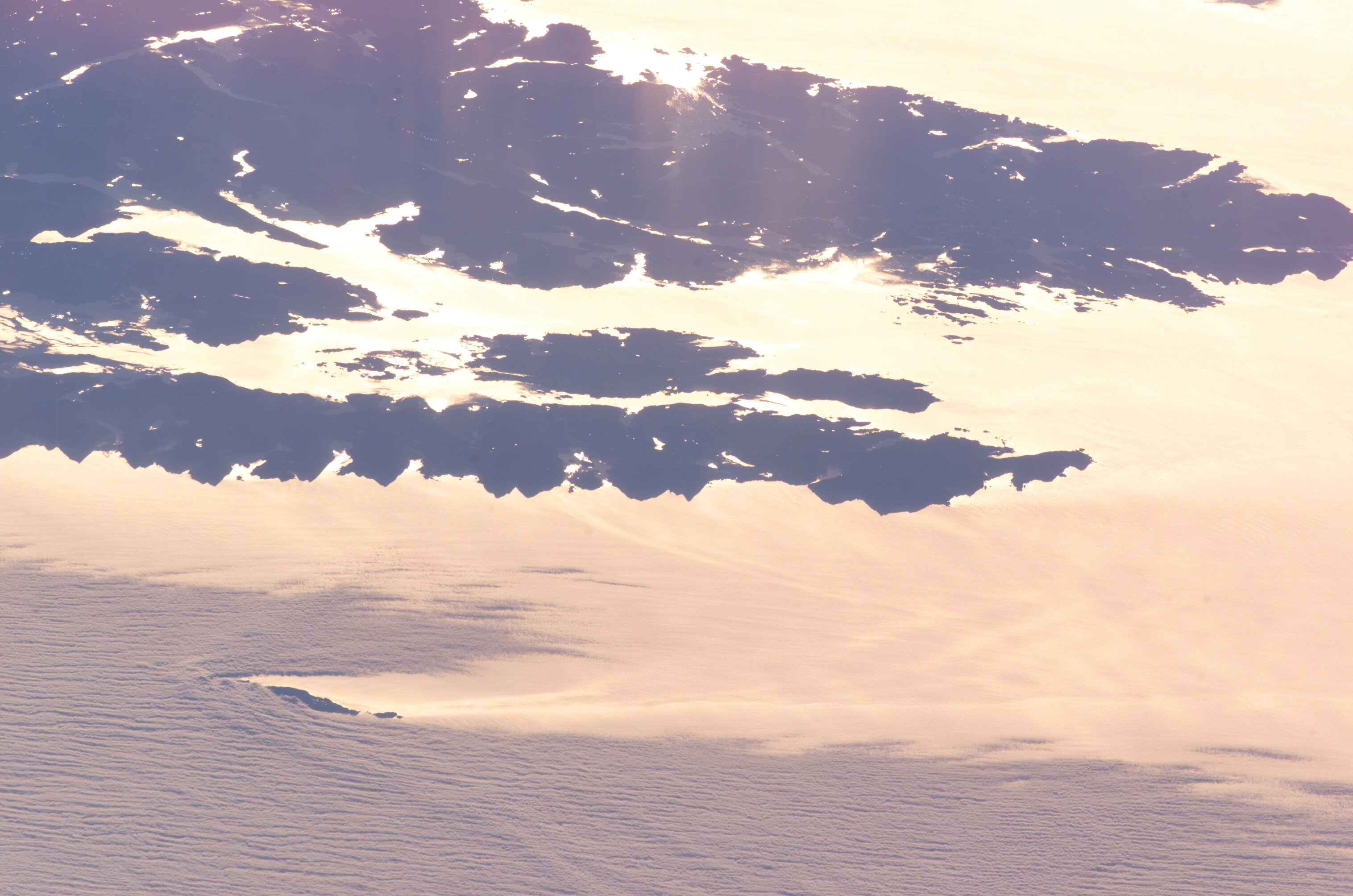
Cordova Bay photographed from Earth orbit, looking toward the sunrise, a bit north of east. Water appears bright due to sunglint. Dall Island, Long Island, and most of Sukkwan island are visible as dark areas in the middle of the picture, while the land near the top of the picture is Prince of Wales Island. The small island at lower left is Forrester Island. NASA image.

The Coast Survey does not consider Tlevak Strait (between Sukkwan Island and Dall Island), Hetta Inlet, or Kaigani Strait (between Long Island and Dall Island) to be parts of Cordova Bay, but the Geographic Dictionary of Alaska (1906) included the latter two, and also Sukkwan Strait (north of Sukkwan Island), as parts of the bay. In 2006, the US Supreme Court ruled against a petition by Alaska that would have declared all these waters, including Tlevak Strait, parts of a juridical Cordova Bay. If this petition had been successful it would have put all these waters under state control, rather than the current mix of state and federal jurisdiction.

Cordova Bay and Tlevak Strait provide a sheltered route to Bucareli Bay and other points on the west coast of Prince of Wales Island. The Coast Guard has estimated that 150 commercial fishing vessels use this route each week during the summer.

The shores of Cordova Bay are a mix of federal land belonging to the Tongass National Forest, private land (mostly owned by Alaska Native Corporations), and a small amount of state-owned land. Much of the eastern shore of the bay is part of the South Prince of Wales Wilderness within the National Forest. The shoreline of the northeast part of the bay, around and between Hetta and Klakas inlets, is steep and rocky. South of Hunter Bay, the Prince of Wales shoreline is more gentle, rising to low rolling hills dotted with lakes. The other three large islands have a mixture of mountainous terrain and hills, with low-lying land at some places along the shore.

The small city of Hydaburg is situated on the north shore of Sukkwan Strait. It is connected to the Prince-of-Wales road system and provides the only public road access to the bay. It has a harbor and a seaplane base.

Hydaburg was formed in 1911 by consolidation of the three Haida villages on Cordova Bay. These villages were Howkan on the west coast of Long Island, Sukkwan at the northern end of Sukkwan Island, and Klinkwan on Prince of Wales Island at the mouth of Hunter Bay. Mining, saltery, and cannery villages on Hetta Inlet, now all abandoned, were Copper City, Hetta, Coppermount, and Sulzer. There were also canneries on Hunter Bay and on Rose Inlet (off of Tlevek Strait).

== See also ==
Orca Bay, Alaska (a branch of Prince William Sound) formerly called Cordova Bay.
