= American Bay =

Waterway in Alaska, United States

Coordinates: 54.847°N 132.827°W

American Bay (also Amerikanskaia, 1883 name by Etolin) is a waterway in the U.S. state of Alaska. It is located on the east side of Dall Island, facing Long Island across Kaigani Strait.

== Geography ==
This bay indents the Dall Island shore a little more than 1 mile (1.6 km) in a general southwest by south direction, with a width of about .5 miles (0.80 km). On the north side of the bay, .25 miles (0.40 km) within the entrance, is a group of four wooded islets, called Hay Islets, connected with each other and with the shore at low water. Southwest of them is Anchorage Cove, where good anchorage may be found in 15 fathoms. The shores of American Bay are free from dangers, and the water, particularly on the south side, is deep.

Northeast of the northern entrance point of American Bay, is a shoal patch measuring from 9 to 16 fathoms. Immediately opposite the entrance to American Bay a reef, showing at low water, extends nearly 1 cable to the southwest from the Long Island shore with deep water close-to. How-Kan Narrows, a name given by local navigators to the contracted passage lying .75 miles (1.21 km) above American Bay is about .5 miles (0.80 km) wide.

== History ==
During the first decades of the 19th century, American Bay was a favorite anchorage of maritime fur traders, especially Americans sailing out of Boston. Along with Datzkoo Harbor and the Kaigani Harbors, a few miles to the south and several large Haida villages that were in the vicinity at the time, this general area was known as "Kaigani" to late 18th and early 19th century maritime fur traders. It was one of the most popular fur trading sites on the Pacific Northwest Coast, where maritime fur traders would trade with the indigenous Haida people. Over a hundred fur trading ships visited American Bay and the Kaigani Harbors in the early 19th century. Datzkoo Harbor was known at the time as Taddiskey, Tattasco, and Taddy's Cove.

A trading post of the Northwest Trading Company was established on American Bay in about 1883. The buildings were still visible in 1891.

== Geology ==
A deposit of schistose marble was reported on the south side of American Bay. The deposit is more than 500 yards wide, stands about vertical, strikes east, and is mostly covered by moss and timber. The marble is both fine and coarse grained and contains mica.

== See also ==
- List of historical ships in British Columbia

== Bibliography ==
- Baker, Marcus (1902). Geographic Dictionary of Alaska (Public domain ed.). U.S. Government Printing Office. p. 73.
- Pacific Coast Pilot (1891). Pacific Coast Pilot: Alaska. Dixon entrance to Yakutat Bay with inland passage from Strait of Fuca to Dixon entrance (Public domain ed.). U.S. Government Printing Office.
- Schultz, Alfred Reginald (1918). A Geologic Reconnaissance for Phosphate and Coal in Southeastern Idaho and Western Wyoming (Public domain ed.). U.S. Government Printing Office.
