= Benjamin Island (Alaska) =

Island in Juneau, Alaska

- Interactive map of Benjamin Island

Geography
- Location: Juneau City and Borough, Alaska
- Coordinates: 58°33′44″N 134°54′38″W
- Archipelago: Alexander Archipelago
- Length: 1.5 mi (2.4 km)
- Width: 0.5 mi (0.8 km)
- Highest elevation: 92 ft (28 m)

Administration
- United States
- State: Alaska
- Borough: Juneau

Benjamin Island (or Benjamin Islet) is an island in the City and Borough of Juneau, Alaska, United States. It was named by Captain Lester A. Beardslee of the United States Navy in 1880. Located off the eastern shore of Favorite Channel, it is 25 miles (40 km) northwest of the city of Juneau.

Benjamin Island is 1.5 miles (2.4 km) long and 0.5 miles (0.80 km) wide. It is about 0.75 miles (1.21 km) north of the Sentinel Island Light and 0.25 miles (0.40 km) south of North Island; it is one of the northernmost islands in Favorite Channel. The island is a part of the Channel Islands State Marine Park; it is used for picnicking and camping.

== History ==
The Canadian Pacific Railway's SS Princess Sophia grounded on Vanderbilt Reef to the north early in the morning of October 24, 1918, in the midst of a snowstorm. The United States Lighthouse Service tender Cedar, captained by John W. Ledbetter, had taken up shelter at a cove of Benjamin Island when it received word of the passenger liner's plight at 14:00 that day. The Cedar left Benjamin Island almost immediately but did not reach the reef until 22:00.

== Wildlife ==
Humpback whales and Steller sea lions live in the area of the island. A cow moose was noted on the island in 2005.

A joint project between the National Marine Fisheries Service and the University of Alaska Fairbanks placed cameras on the island for the purposes of studying the sea lions.

== See also ==
- Lynn Canal
