= Kaigani (trading site) =

Coordinates: 54.75°N 132.71°W

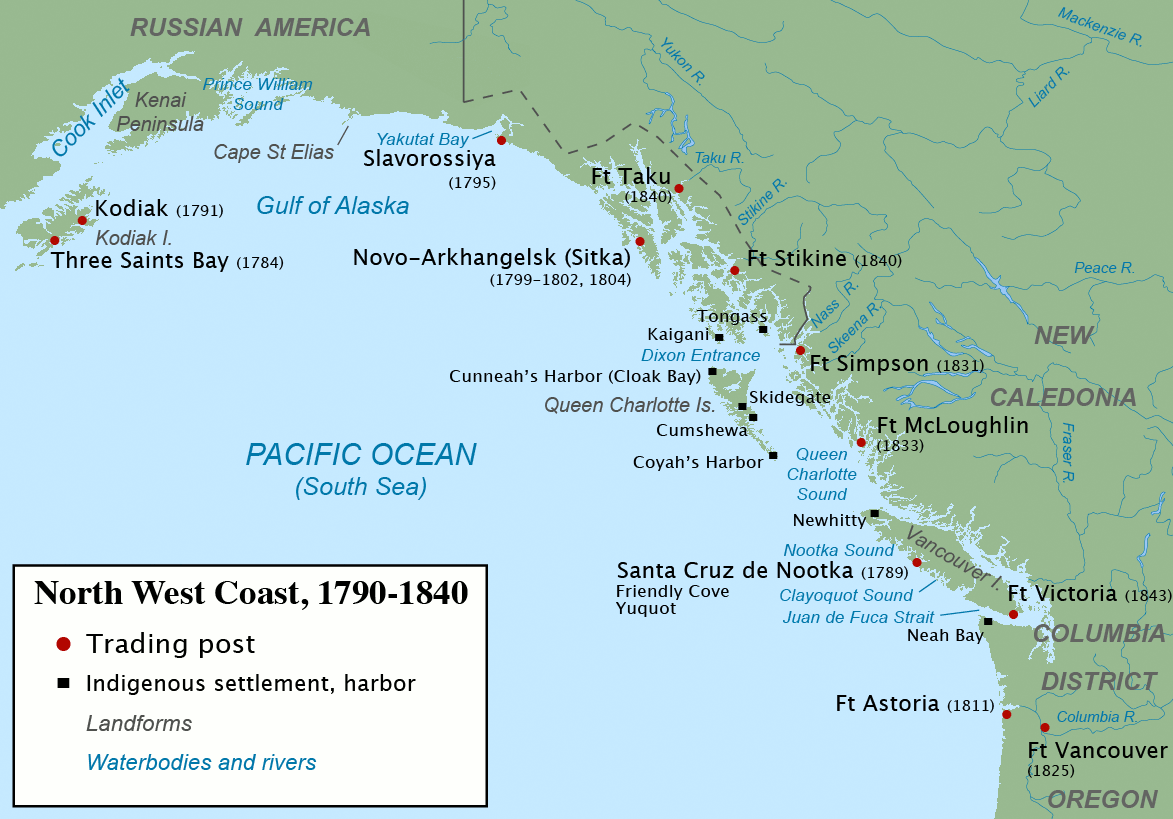
The North West Coast during the maritime fur trade era, about 1790 to 1840

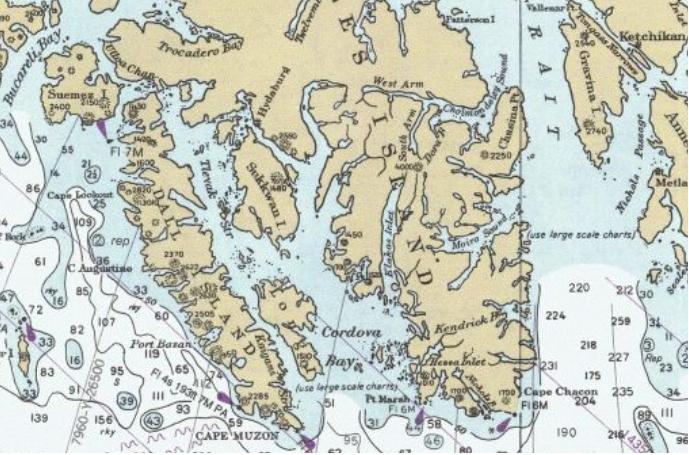
The Kaigani trading area included several harbors on the southeastern coast of Dall Island, near Cape Muzon. US Coast Survey chart detail

Kaigani was a major trading site for maritime fur traders and the Kaigani Haida during the maritime fur trade era of approximately 1790 to 1850. The term was used for a few nearby anchorages near several Haida settlements such as Kasaan. During this time Kaigani was one of the most popular sites for trading vessels on the Pacific Northwest coast. Hundreds of trading vessels, mostly American, visited during this time, mostly seeking sea otter skins to take to China, where they commanded a high price.

The term "Kaigani" was used by these traders for several harbors on the eastern side of southern Dall Island near Cape Muzon, in southeast Alaska, just north of Haida Gwaii across Dixon Entrance. The word "Kaigani" also refers to the Haida who live in this area. The word continues to be used for the general locale, as well as various geographical features in the area, such as Kaigani Strait, between Dall Island and Long Island, Kaigani Harbors, North Kaigani Harbor, and South Kaigani Harbor. Historically the term often included nearby places such as Datzkoo Harbor and American Bay.

Maritime fur traders spelled Kaigani in many ways, including: Caiganne, Caigannee, Cargan, Clegauhny, Cygarney, Kaigahnee, Kigarnee, Kigahani, Kigahnee, Kigarny, Kigharnee, Kigharnee, Kly-garney, Ky-garney, and Kywannee.

During the maritime fur trade era there were several Haida chiefs holding power in the Kaigani area or mentioned by the traders, such as Cuneah (also spelled Cunnyha, Cunnea, Cunio), Cow (Kow, Keow), Altatsee (Altadsee, Eltatsy), Kilchart, Cotseye, Lemor (Lemmato), Douglass (Duglos, Douglas) (whose name derives from a historic name exchange with the British trader William Douglas), and others.

After about 1840 the Hudson's Bay Company took over the coastal fur trade and the HBC post of Fort Simpson eclipsed Kaigani as a trading site.

== See also ==
- List of historical ships in British Columbia
