= Sukkwan Island =

Island in Alaska, United States

Coordinates: 55°05′48″N 132°46′33″W

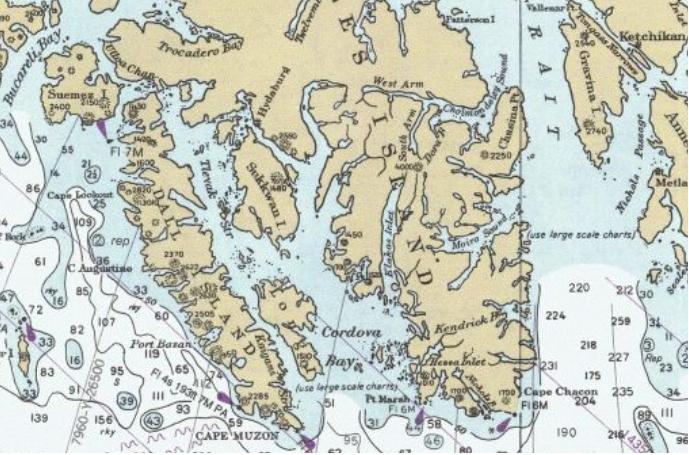
Sukkwan Island lies near the head of Cordova Bay, north of Long Island and east of Dall Island. US Coast Survey chart detail

Sukkwan Island is an island in the Alexander Archipelago of southeastern Alaska, United States. It lies just off the southwest coast of Prince of Wales Island. To its west lies Dall Island, and to its south lies Long Island. The nearest city is Hydaburg, to its north on Prince of Wales Island, just across the Sukkwan Strait. The island's area is 166.9 km^{2} (64.44 sq mi) and a population of nine persons was reported at the 2000 census.

Sukkwan Island is where the eponymous novella by David Vann takes place.
