= Aleksei Chirikov =

Russian navigator and explorer (1703–1748)

Captain Aleksei Ilyich Chirikov
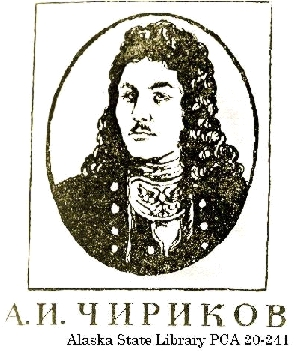
- Native name: Алексей Ильич Чириков
- Born: Aleksei Ilyich Chirikov; 1703; Luzhnoye, Russia
- Died: November 14, 1748 (aged 44–45) Moscow, Russia
- Buried: Tula Oblast, Russia
- Allegiance: Russia
- Branch: Imperial Russian Navy
- Service years: 1716–1748
- Rank: Captain
- Other work: Navigator

Aleksei Ilyich Chirikov (Russian: Алексе́й Ильи́ч Чи́риков; 1703 – November 14, 1748) was a Russian navigator and captain who, along with Vitus Bering, was the first Russian to reach the northwest coast of North America. He discovered and charted some of the Aleutian Islands while he was deputy to Vitus Bering during the Great Northern Expedition.

== Biography ==
=== Early life ===
Little is known about Chirikov's early life other than that the Russian was born in 1703. There is a claim, which originated in 1941, that he was the son of one of Peter the Great's master carpenters.

It is known that Chirikov began his service in the Russian Imperial Navy in 1716, and later in 1721 he graduated from the Naval Academy with the rank of Sub-lieutenant.

=== Exploration ===
In 1725–1730 and 1733–1743, he was Vitus Bering's deputy during the First and the Second Kamchatka expeditions, having been made a captain in 1733.

In June 1741 Chirikov in the St Paul and Vitus Bering in the St Peter, who he was serving under, left Petropavlovsk-Kamchatsky and headed east. Some time after 20 June they were separated by a storm and never saw each other again. On 15 July 1741 Chirikov saw land at Baker Island off Prince of Wales Island at the south end of the Alaska Panhandle. This was about 450 miles southeast of Bering's landfall near Mount St. Elias at the north end of the panhandle. Unable to find a harbor he sailed north along Baranov Island past the later Russian base at Sitka. He sent out a longboat to find an anchorage. When it did not return after a week he sent out his second longboat which also failed to return. Now without any small boats Chirikov had no way of searching for the two longboats or landing on the coast to explore or replenish his supply of fresh water. After waiting as long as possible, he abandoned the longboats to their fate and on 27 July sailed west. He sighted the Kenai Peninsula, Kodiak Island and Adak Island near the western end of the Aleutians. With water critically low he reached Petropavlovsk on 12 October 1741.

In 1742, Chirikov was in charge of a search party for Bering's ship St. Peter. During this trip, he located Attu Island. Chirikov took part in creating the final map of the Russian discoveries in the Pacific Ocean (1746). In 1746 was assigned the Director of Academy of the Naval Guard, St. Petersburg. Chirikov's name is given to Capes of the Kyūshū Island, Attu Island, Anadyr Bay, Tauyskaya Bay, an underwater mountain in the Pacific Ocean, Chirikof Island and Cape Chirikof at the westernmost point of Baker Island.

Chirikov died on November 14, 1748, in Moscow due to scurvy.

== See also ==
- History of Alaska
- Aleksey Chirikov (icebreaker)
