= Pavlof Islands =

Island group in Alaska, United States

Coordinates: 55°08′00″N 161°42′00″W

The Pavlof Islands (Qudugin in Aleut) are a group of seven islands that lie south of Pavlof Bay on the Alaska Peninsula. They are part of the Aleutians East Borough in the U.S. state of Alaska. The islands include Dolgoi Island (Anganax̂six̂), Goloi (Atx̂uunux̂), Inner Iliasik (Iluuĝix̂ Ixsaĝdaaĝux̂), Outer Iliasik (Qagaaĝix̂ Ixsaĝdaaĝux̂), Poperechnoi (Kuyagdax̂), Ukolnoi (Kitaĝutax̂̂), and Wosnesenski (Unatxux̂). Dolgoi Island is the largest of these in area. They have a total land area of 206.265 km^{2} (79.639 sq mi) and are uninhabited.

An increase in earthquake activity was noted at Pavlof on June 1, 1997. Two days later the National Weather Service in Cold Bay reported a steam plume rising 3,000 feet (914 m) above Pavlof's summit. The Alaska Volcano Observatory monitors the volcano and expects renewed activity. Pavlof last erupted from September to December 1996. This update is based on information posted by the U.S. Geological Survey's Alaska Volcano Observatory on Volcan ListServ on June 3, 1997.

1838 Aleksandr Kashevarov, a Creole commanding Russian-American Company merchant vessels, led a party traveling in skin boats from Cape Lisburne to a point 30 miles east of Point Barrow. He recorded information about the Inuit.

The English name for the island comes from Pitka Pavalof, a Creole of Russian-Native. In 1893, Pitka Pavalof and Sergei Gologoff Cherosky, Creoles of Russian-Native descent, found gold on Birch Creek in Interior Alaska. Learning of the discovery, prospectors jumped their claims and argued that the claims were invalid because the men were Natives. The discovery attracted more non-Natives to the Yukon River and the town of Circle was founded.
