= Kaigani Strait =

Waterway in Alaska

Coordinates: 54.874°N 132.819°W

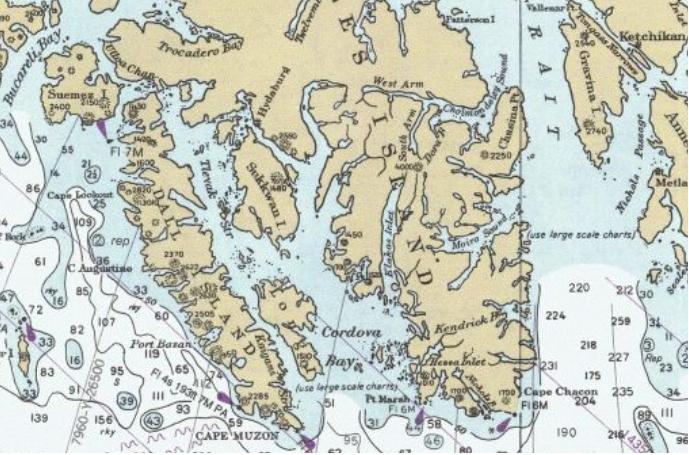
NOAA chart of the area. Kaigani Strait is in the lower middle area, between Dall Island and Long Island, just west of Cordova Bay and north of Cape Muzon.

Kaigani Strait (also, Kaigahnee, Kaigan, Kaijani) is a waterway in the U.S. state of Alaska, the southern part of the strait between Long Island and Dall Island. The Alaska Native name, as reported by Etolin is 1833, is Kalgan.

Kaigani is the narrow passage extending from Dixon Entrance to Tlevak Strait and separating Long Island from Dall Island. Howkan Narrows is the narrowest part of the passage, with kelp-marked reefs, from American Bay to above Channel Island. The strait is little used except by small craft. The Kaigani Harbors are three indentations in the shore of Dall Island; they are all exposed southeastward. American Bay lies on the southwest side of Kaigani Strait, 7 miles (11 km) above Kaigani Point and about 1 mile (1.6 km) southward of Howkan.

During the early 19th century the strait was a major gathering place for maritime fur trade ships, mostly from New England, to meet and trade with the Haida people. Several trading sites were collectively known as Kaigani. Hundreds of trading ships visited between about 1790 and 1850. Haida people brought to Kaigani furs and other trade goods from a wide area. One of the main Haida chiefs involved was Cuneah.

== Bibliography ==
- United States Coast Pilot (1917). United States Coast Pilot: Alaska. Dixon Entrance to Yakutat Bay (Public domain ed.). U.S. Government Printing Office.
- U.S. Government (1906). Bulletin (Public domain ed.). U.S. Government Printing Office.
