= Pavlof Bay =

Coordinates: 55°32′02″N 161°32′27″W

Pavlof Bay is an inlet in Alaska located on the southwestern edge of the Alaska Peninsula. It is on the peninsula's south coast, is about 50 miles (80 kilometers) long, and lies directly north of the Pavlof Islands. The 8,261-foot (2,518-meter) volcano Mount Pavlof is on its western shore.
