= Ragged Island (Pye Islands) =

Island in Alaska, United States

Coordinates: 59.437965°N 150.364854°W

Ragged Island is one of the Part of Pye Islands on the southern tip of the Kenai Peninsula, Alaska. Nearest City Near Ragged Island is Seldovia. Its elevation is near 689 ft(210.01m). It is east of Nuka Island, separated by Nuka Bay.

== History ==
Named by U.S. Coast and Geodetic Survey (USC&GS) in 1929, "because of the ragged and broken character of this island."
