= Partofshikof Island =

Island in Sitka City and Borough, Alaska, United States

Coordinates: 57°16′16″N 135°37′31″W

Partofshikof Island is an island in the Alexander Archipelago of southeastern Alaska, United States. It is part of the City and Borough of Sitka, and lies between the northern part of Kruzof Island and the northwestern part of Baranof Island. It is separated from Kruzof Island by Sukoi Inlet, and separated from Baranof Island by Neva Strait. Partofshikof Island has a land area of 34.177 km^{2} (13.195 sq mi) and no resident population.
