= Sunglint =

Optical phenomenon related to sunlight reflected on water

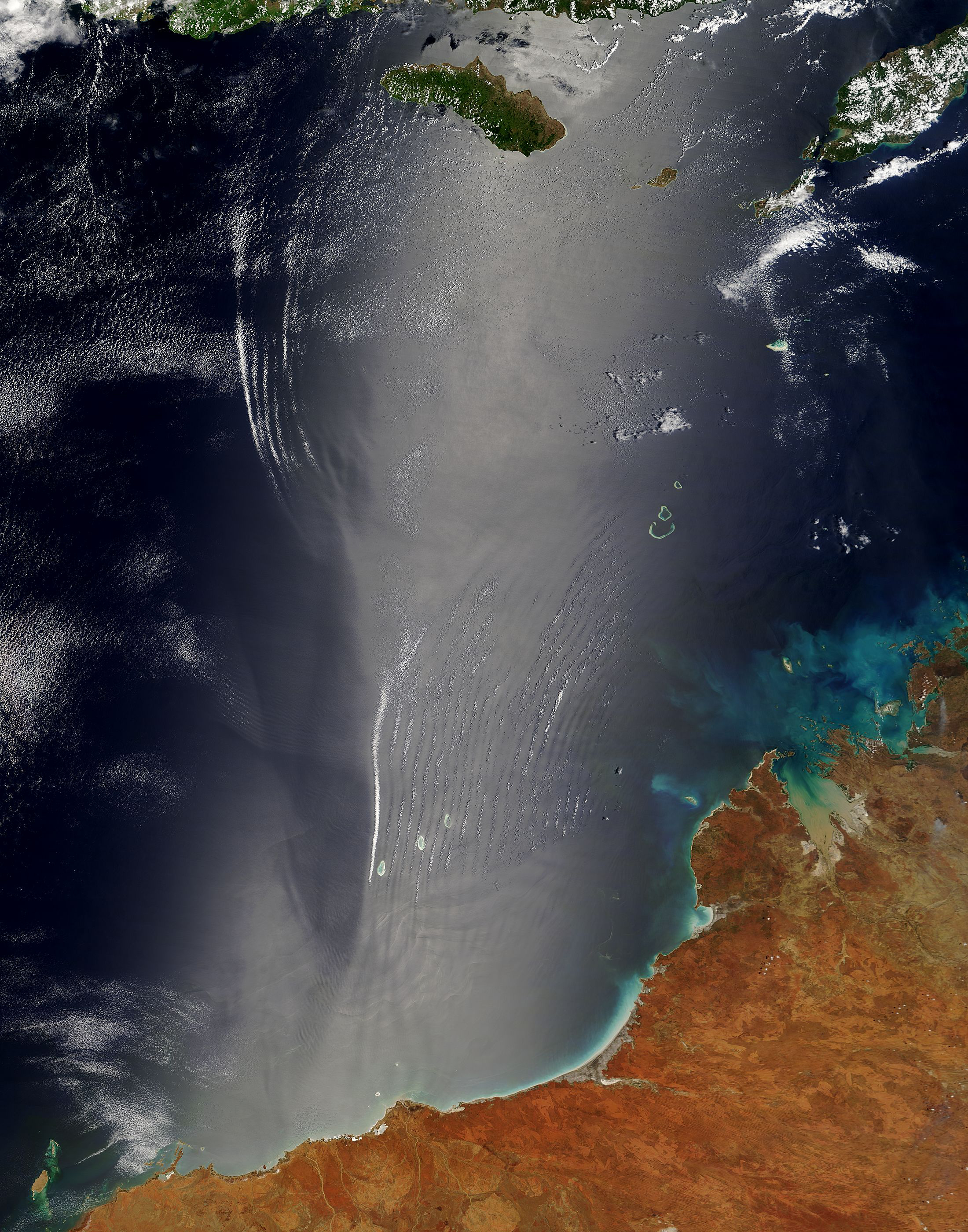
Sunglint off southern Indonesia and northern Australia.

Sunglint is a phenomenon that occurs when sunlight reflects off the surface of the ocean at the same angle that a satellite or other sensor is viewing the surface. In the affected area of the image, smooth ocean water becomes a silvery mirror, while rougher surface waters appear dark. Sometimes the sunglint region of satellite images reveals interesting ocean or atmospheric features that the sensor does not typically record.

As an example of interesting features revealed by sunglint, the accompanying image shows a large, overlapping wave pattern in the sunglint region of an image of Indonesia (the islands at the top of the image) and Australia (the landmass at the bottom of the image). The wave pattern seen in the image is not from large ocean waves, however. The pattern is of atmospheric gravity waves above the surface of the ocean. They form when buoyancy pushes air up, and gravity pulls it back down. On its descent into the low-point of the wave (the trough), the air touches the surface of the ocean, roughening the water. The long, vertical dark lines show where the troughs of gravity waves have roughened the surface. The brighter regions show the crests of the atmospheric waves. Beneath the crests, the water is calm and reflects light directly back towards the sensor. Clouds commonly form at the crests of the waves, and such clouds are visible throughout this scene.

== Images that show sunglint ==
Below is a gallery of images that show sunglint.

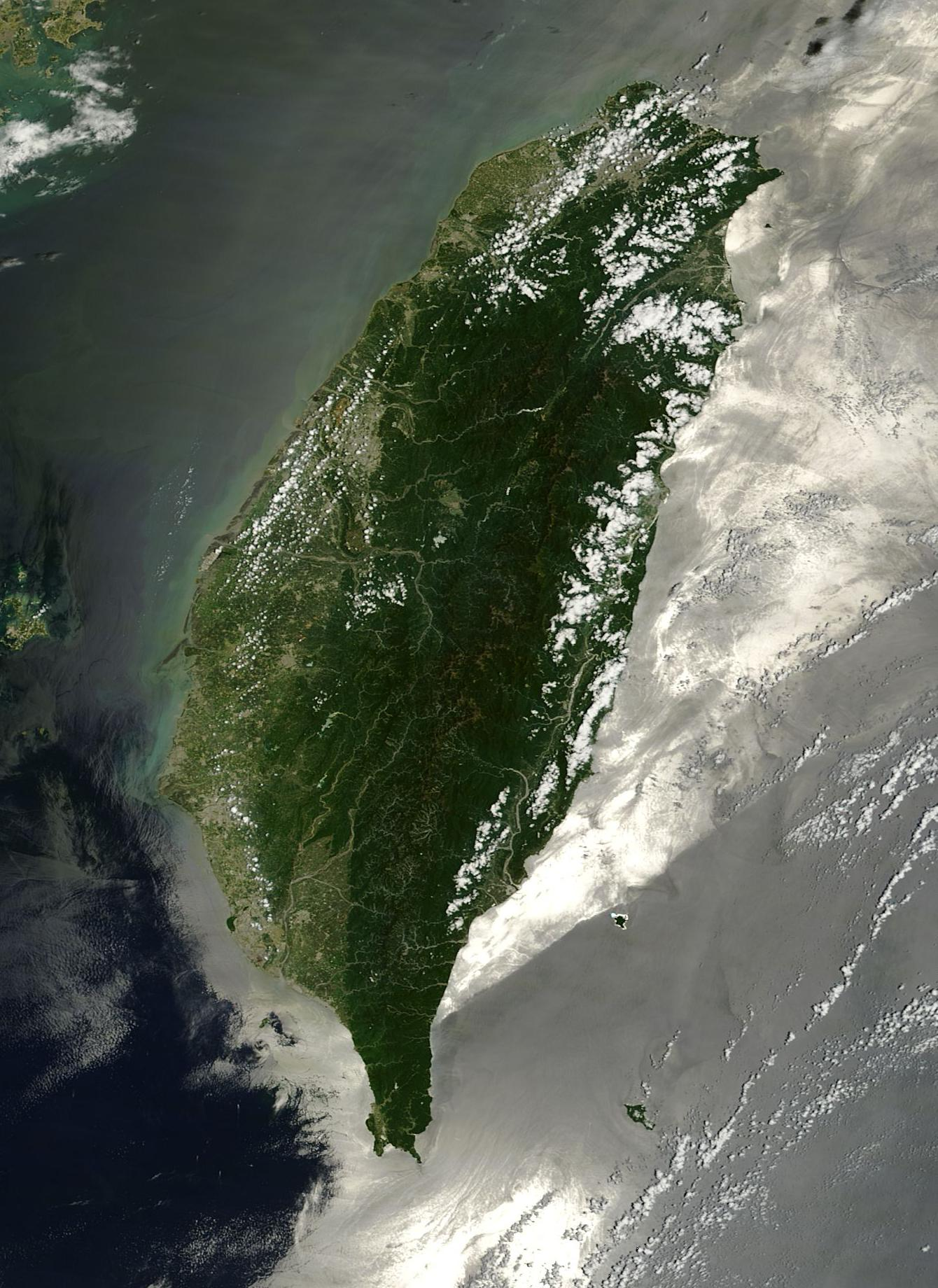
Intense sunglint east of Taiwan.

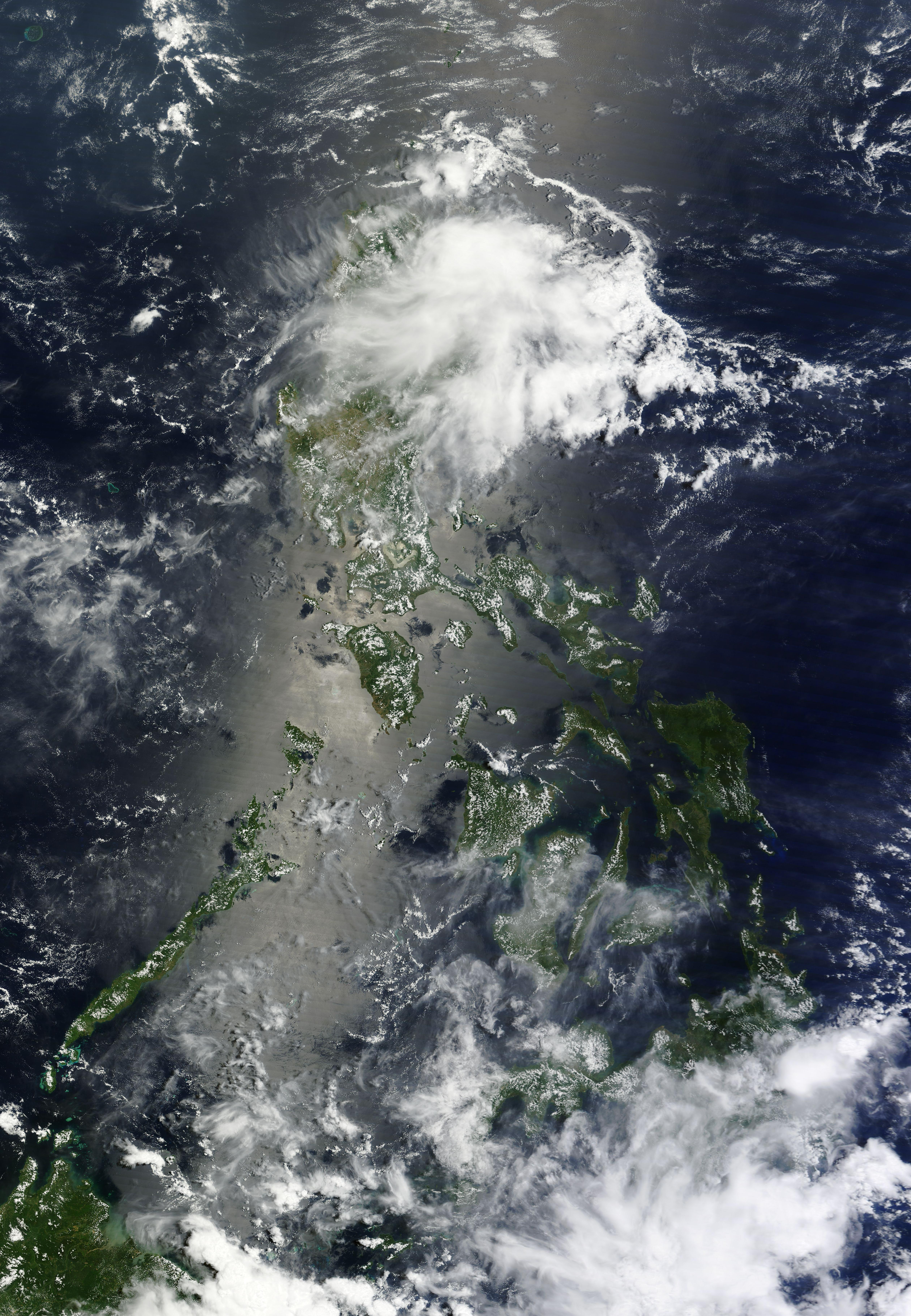
Moderate sunglint over the Philippines, showing that land does not reflect sunlight in the specular (mirror-like) way that smooth water does.

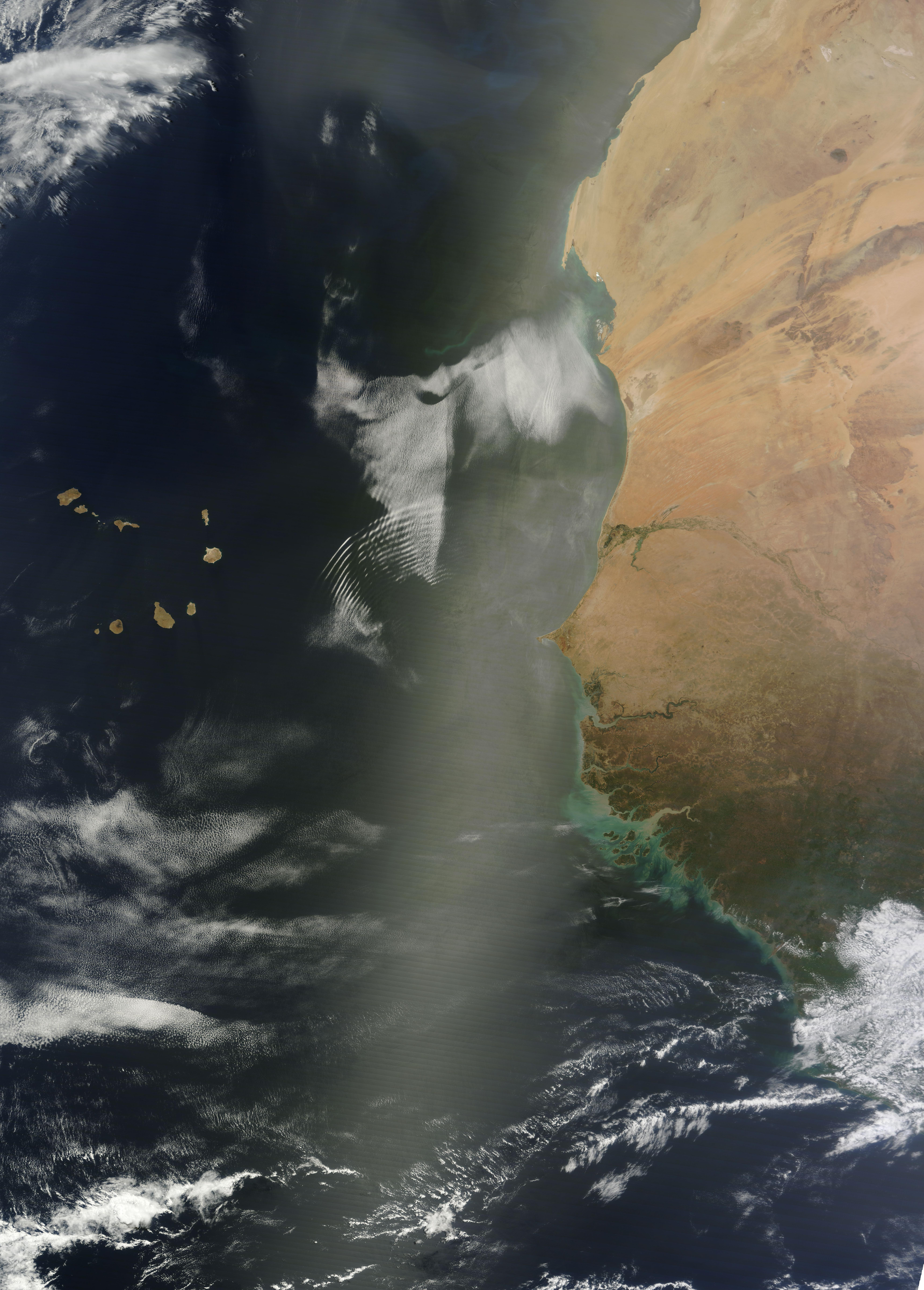
Sunglint off the western coast of Africa, in the Atlantic Ocean.

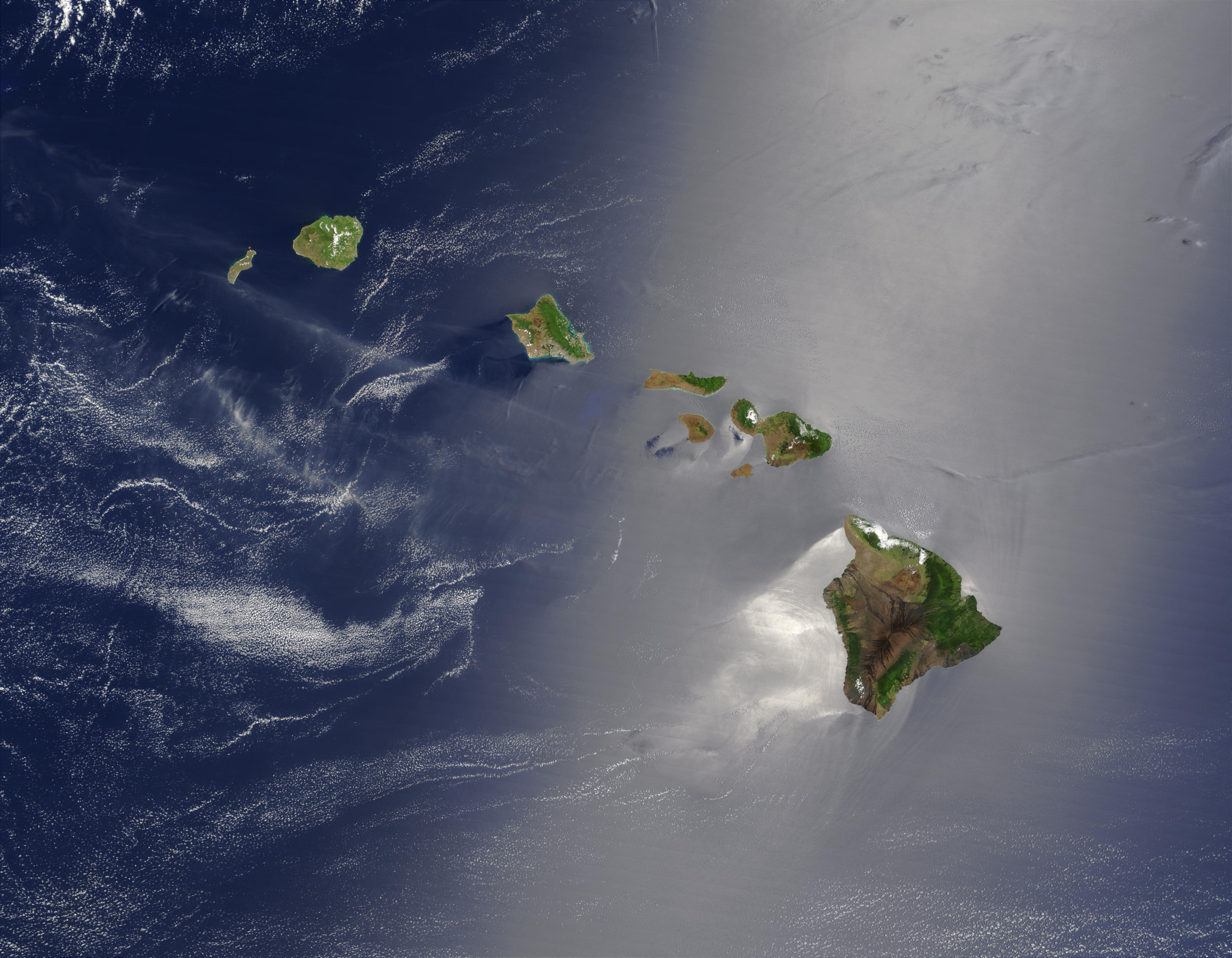
Sunglint highlights calmer conditions in the lee of the Hawaiian islands.

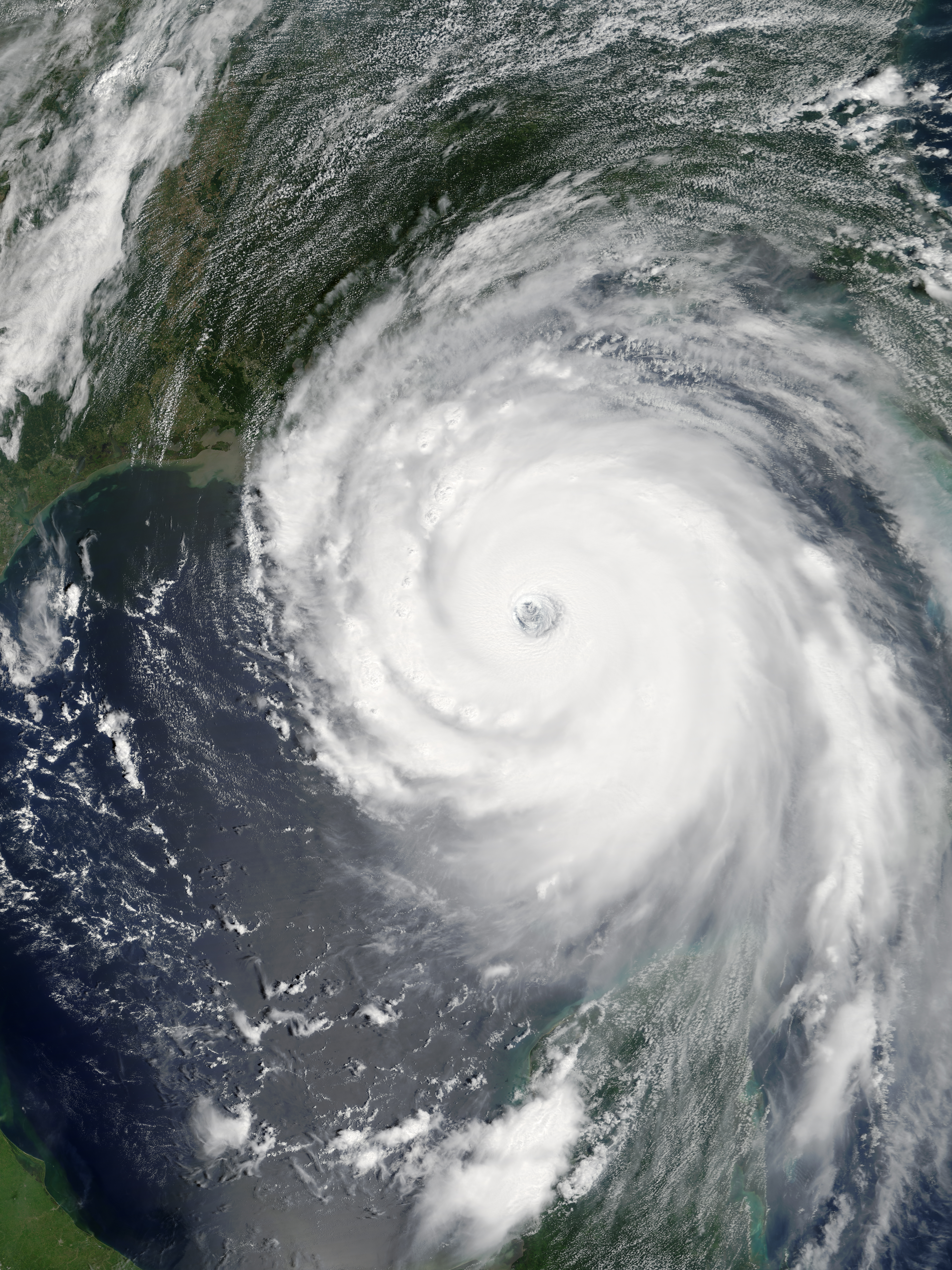
Sunglint near Hurricane Katrina.

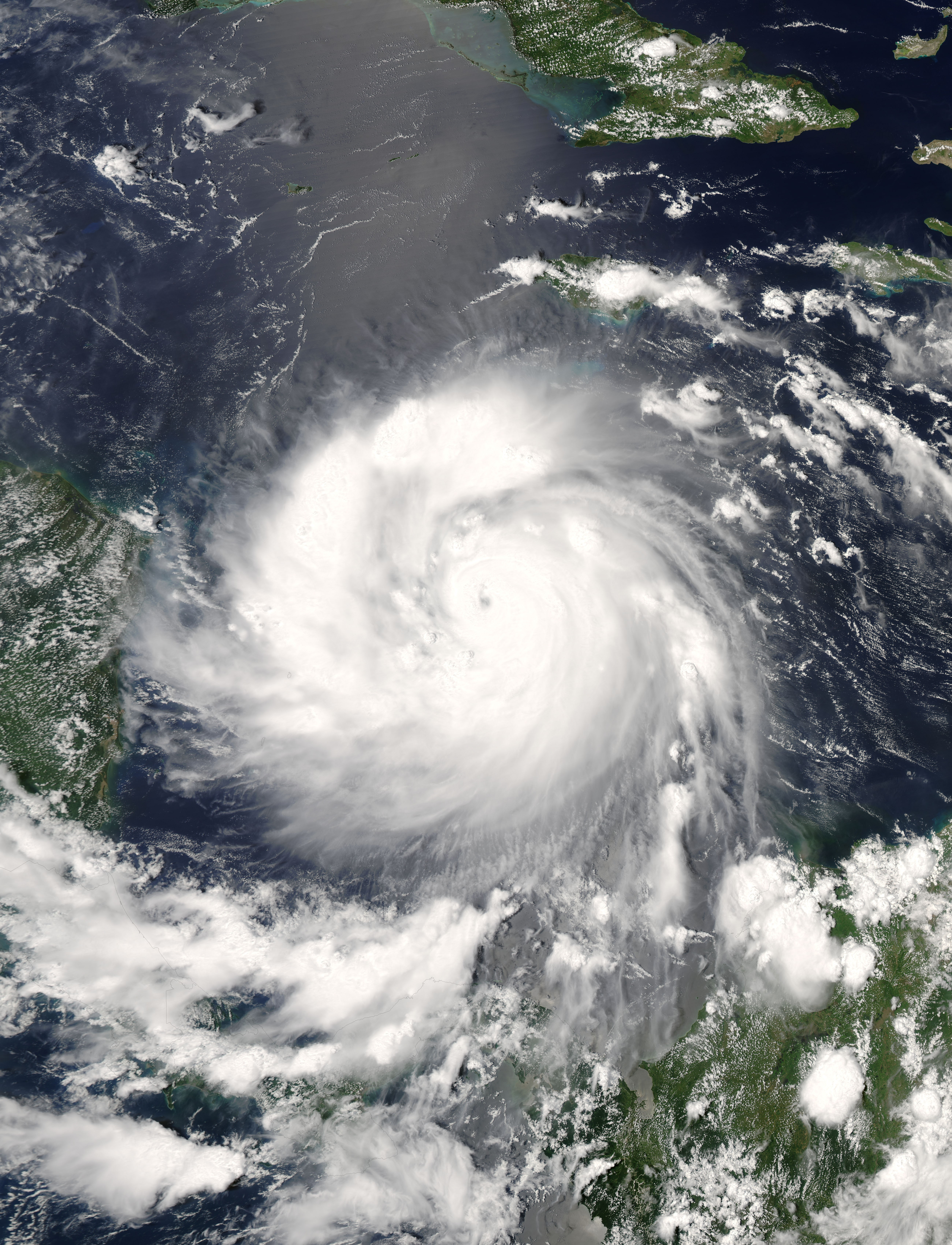
Hurricane Felix approaching Central America.

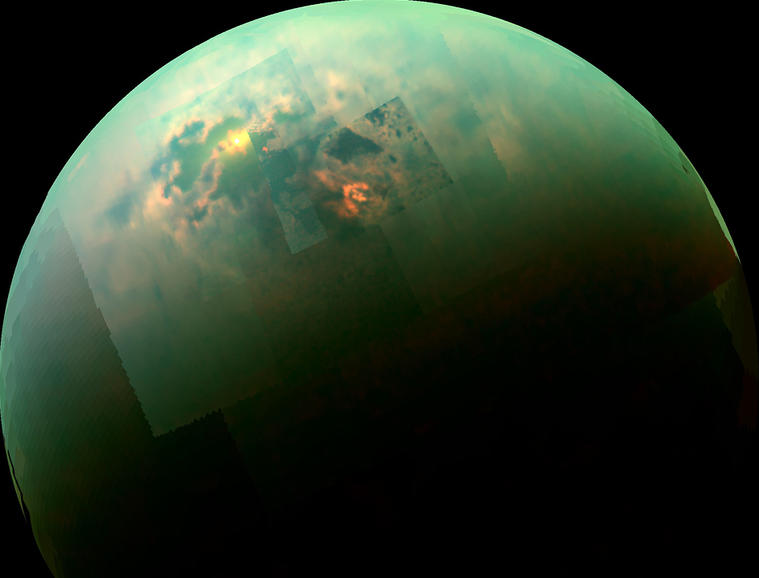
This false-color mosaic, made from infrared data collected by NASA's Cassini spacecraft, reveals the differences in the composition of surface materials around hydrocarbon lakes at Titan, Saturn's largest moon.

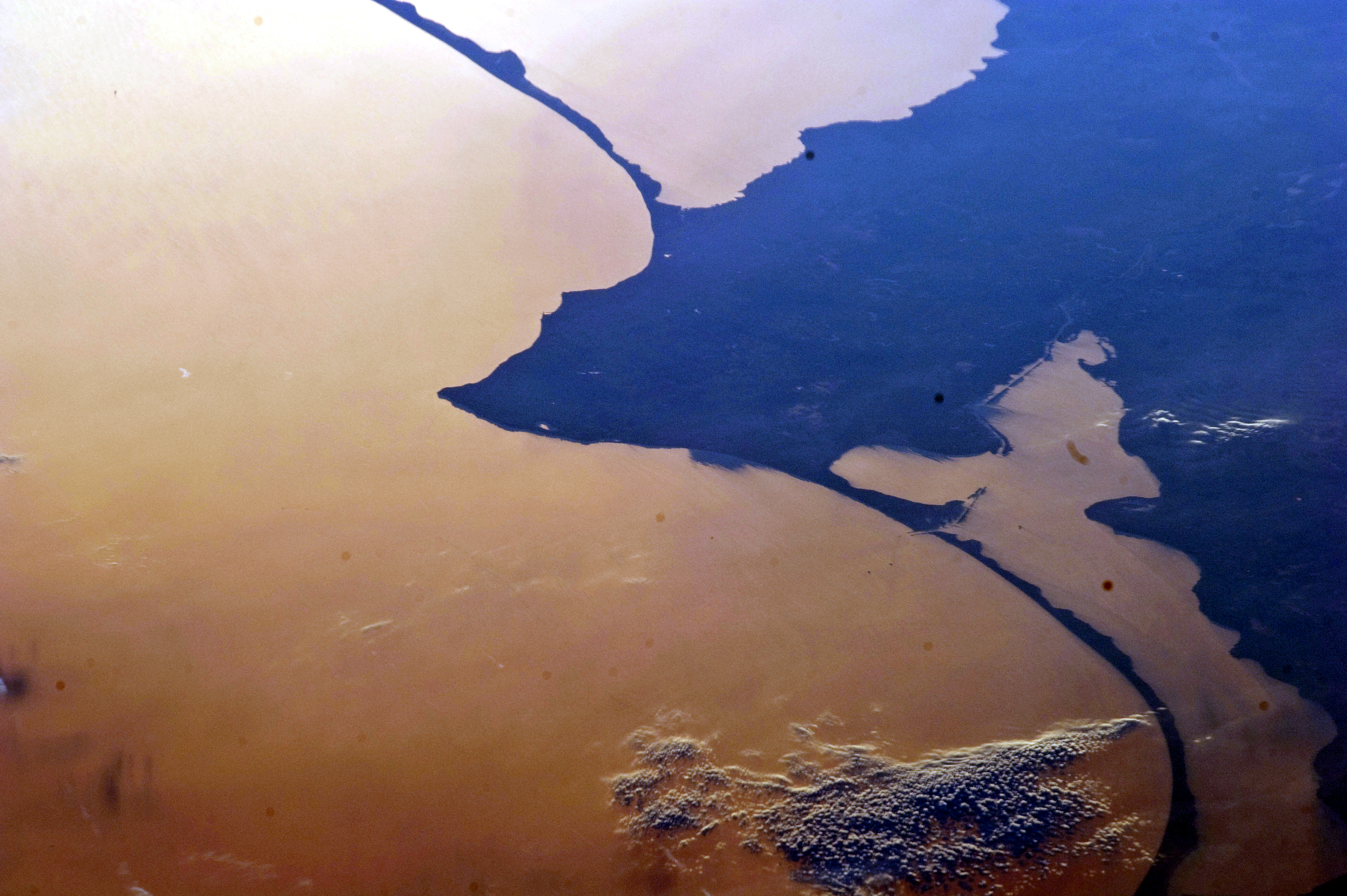
From an astronaut's perspective in low-Earth orbit, land surfaces usually appear brighter than water. But in this image, sunglint inverts this pattern: The dark blue areas are land (Kaliningrad).

== See also ==
- Sun glitter
