= Sullivan Island =

Island in Alaska, United States

Coordinates: 58°58′21″N 135°19′37″W

Sullivan Island is an island in Lynn Canal, southwest of Chilkat Island, Southeast Alaska, United States. It was named in 1869 by Commander R. W. Meade, USN, for the master of the schooner Louisa Downs, which had wrecked on the island in 1867. The Tlingit name for the island is "Schikuk". The first European to discover and chart the island was Joseph Whidbey, master of HMS Discovery during George Vancouver's 1791–1795 expedition, in 1794.
