= San Juan Islands (Alaska) =

Coordinates: 57°17′14″N 134°00′18″W

The San Juan Islands are a small archipelago in the Alaska Panhandle, located 53 miles east of Sitka, in Pybus Bay on the southeast flank of Admiralty Island.
