= Gull Island (Prudhoe Bay) =

Gull Island is a small island located at 70.365745°N 148.366098°W, 8 km (5 miles) off shore from Prudhoe Bay, Alaska, in the Beaufort Sea. In plan view it is shaped somewhat like the capital letter "L", with a length of approximately 300 m, and is about 30 m wide along much of its length. In some satellite images it appears like a small crescent, due to its low topographic prominence above sea level. Little more than a gravel pad, it is a roosting place for seagulls in the summertime. It was also the site of petroleum exploration as part of the larger Prudhoe Bay Oil Field exploration in the 1960s and 1970s.

== Others ==
There are a number of other small islands in state of Alaska that are named "Gull Island", notably one near Homer that is a nesting site for common murres.
