= Long Island (Alaska) =

Island in the Alexander Archipelago, Alaska, United States

Coordinates: 54°52′16″N 132°43′07″W

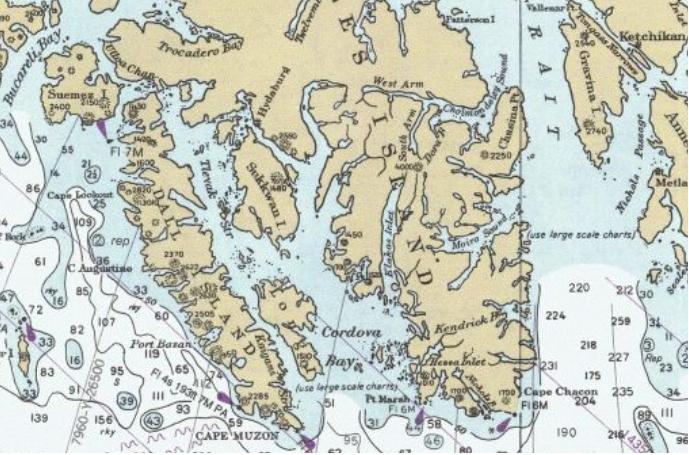
Long Island lies east of Dall Island and forms part of the western boundary of Cordova Bay. US Coast Survey chart detail

Long Island is an island in the Alexander Archipelago of southeastern Alaska, United States. It lies across the Kaigani Strait from the southern portion of Dall Island and west of the southern part of Prince of Wales Island. Directly to its north is Sukkwan Island. Long Island forms part of the western boundary of Cordova Bay, and has a land area of 116.136 km^{2} (44.84 sq mi) and was unpopulated at the 2000 census.

Long Island was the site of the Kaigani Haida village of Howkan, once one of the largest Haida villages, which may originally have been a winter residence. During the 19th century it was cited variously as having 300-500 residents. The Haida village of Kweundlas (Koianglas) was also located on Long Island. Additionally there was an old Haida site near Kaigani Point at the southern end of the island.

In the early 19th century maritime fur traders frequented Kaigani Strait on the west side of Long Island, especially American Bay, Datzkoo Harbor, and the Kaigani Harbors on Dall Island facing Long Island, collectively known as "Kaigani", trading with the Kaigani Haida of Long Island, Dall Island, and the greater vicinity.

It was home to a logging camp in the 1980s, including a three-room school house.

== Demographics ==
Historical population
Census	Pop.	Note	%±
1990	198		—
U.S. Decennial Census

Long Island appeared once on the 1990 U.S. Census as a census-designated place. It was dissolved effective 2000 with the closure of the logging camp. This is not to be confused with the former city of Long Island, which is now within Big Lake.
