= Duke Island (Alaska) =

Island in Alaska, United States

Native name: G̠ilʼi Shakʼ
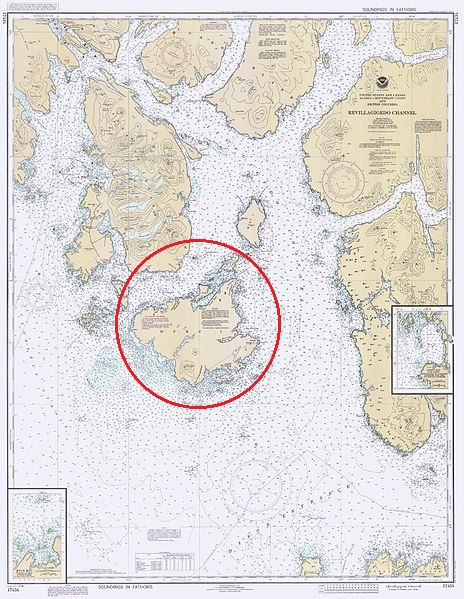
- Duke Island in the center of a 1989 United States NOAA chart of Revillagigedo Channel

- Location within Alaska

Geography
- Location: Alaska Panhandle
- Coordinates: 54°55′51″N 131°20′44″W
- Archipelago: Alexander Archipelago
- Length: 19 km (11.8 mi)
- Width: 13 km (8.1 mi)

Administration
- United States
- State: Alaska
- Borough: Ketchikan Gateway Borough

Duke Island (Tlingit: G̠ilʼi Shakʼ) is an island in the Gravina Islands of the Alexander Archipelago in the southeastern part of the U.S. state of Alaska and within Tongass National Forest. The island is just north of the Canada–United States border, about 30 miles (48 kilometres) south of Ketchikan and about 60 miles (97 kilometres) northwest of Prince Rupert, British Columbia. It is about 12 mi (19 km) long east–west and 10 mi (16 km) north-south.

The original name for the island in the Tlingit language is: Yeixhi (building), referring to it looking like something under construction when viewed from the waters around it.

The island was named by William Healey Dall in 1879. He probably took the name from the island's southern cape, which George Vancouver had named in 1793 after the Duke of Northumberland.

Duke Island is a roadless area of Tongass National Forest under the Alaska Roadless Rule. The Duke Island Roadless Area consists of Duke Island, Mary Island, and the Percy Islands.

Duke Island hosts an Alaskan-type ultramafic complex which as of 2010 was being explored for magmatic sulfide Cu-Ni-PGE deposits.

Duke Island is an important and ancient indigenous location, with numerous archaeological sites dating back at least several thousand years. The Taantakwaan (Taantʼa Ḵwáan) Tlingit ("Tongass people"), Sanyakwaan (Saanyaa Ḵwáan) Tlingit, and the Tsimshian people of Metlakatla all consider Duke Island to be a very sacred place and an integral part of their history and contemporary life. Additionally, Duke Island is where the Taantakwaan had their first contacts with Westerners who came as maritime fur traders. After extensive mineral exploration for anomalous copper, nickel, platinum, and palladium began in 2005 the Taantakwaan Tlingit, along with the Native Site Guardianship Council and the Ketchikan Indian Community (KIC) objected and began the process of designating the island, along with others nearby, a traditional cultural property (TCP). A determination of eligibility for TCP began in 2009. The study concluded that the Duke Island Area is eligible to the National Register of Historic Places as a TCP. On 9 June 2011 the State Historic Preservation Office concurred that the Duke Island Area is eligible under all criteria.

In 2020 the Trump administration announced a new Roadless Rule that exempted Tongass National Forest, including Duke Island, from the Alaska Roadless Rule. In 2023, after study and review that began in 2021, the Biden administration repealed the 2020 Trump administration's Roadless Rule, returning to the 2001 Clinton-era Roadless Rule. This resulted in Duke Island once again being a designated roadless area of Tongass National Forest.
