= Cape Muzon =

Cape in Alaska, United States

Coordinates: 54°40′4″N 132°41′20″W

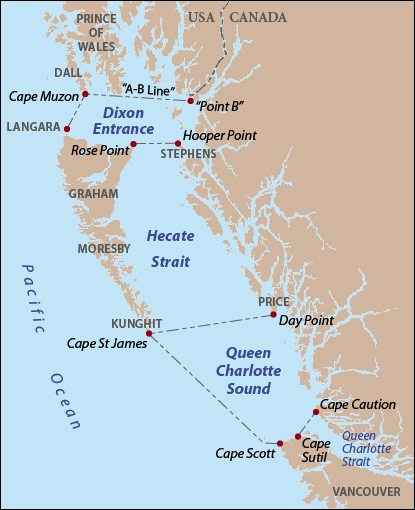
Cape Muzon shown as the southernmost point of Dall Island, the northwestern point of Dixon Entrance, and the western end of the disputed "A-B Line" boundary between Canada and the United States.

Cape Muzon is a cape located in the Alexander Archipelago of the U.S. state of Alaska. It is the southernmost point of Dall Island and the headland marking the northwestern extremity of the Dixon Entrance. The boundary line separating Alaska from Canada runs very close to Cape Muzon, although according to the Alaska Boundary Treaty Cape Muzon is defined precisely as the western end of the so-called A-B Line, part of the Canada–United States border.

The name comes from Jacinto Caamaño, who named it Cabo de Muñoz in 1792. George Vancouver adopted Caamaño's place names and apparently transposed two letters, making Muzon. In 1787 George Dixon called it Cape Pitt. It has been known by other names such as Cape Irving, Kaigani, Caiganee, and Kygane. Its native name was published in Russian as Mys Kaygany by Captain Tebenkov in 1852. During the maritime fur trade era the trading site known as "Kaigani" was located close to Cape Muzon.

== See also ==
- List of areas disputed by Canada and the United States
- Alaska boundary dispute
