= Nuka Island =

Island in Kenai Peninsula Borough, Alaska, United States

Coordinates: 59°21′30″N 150°40′12″W

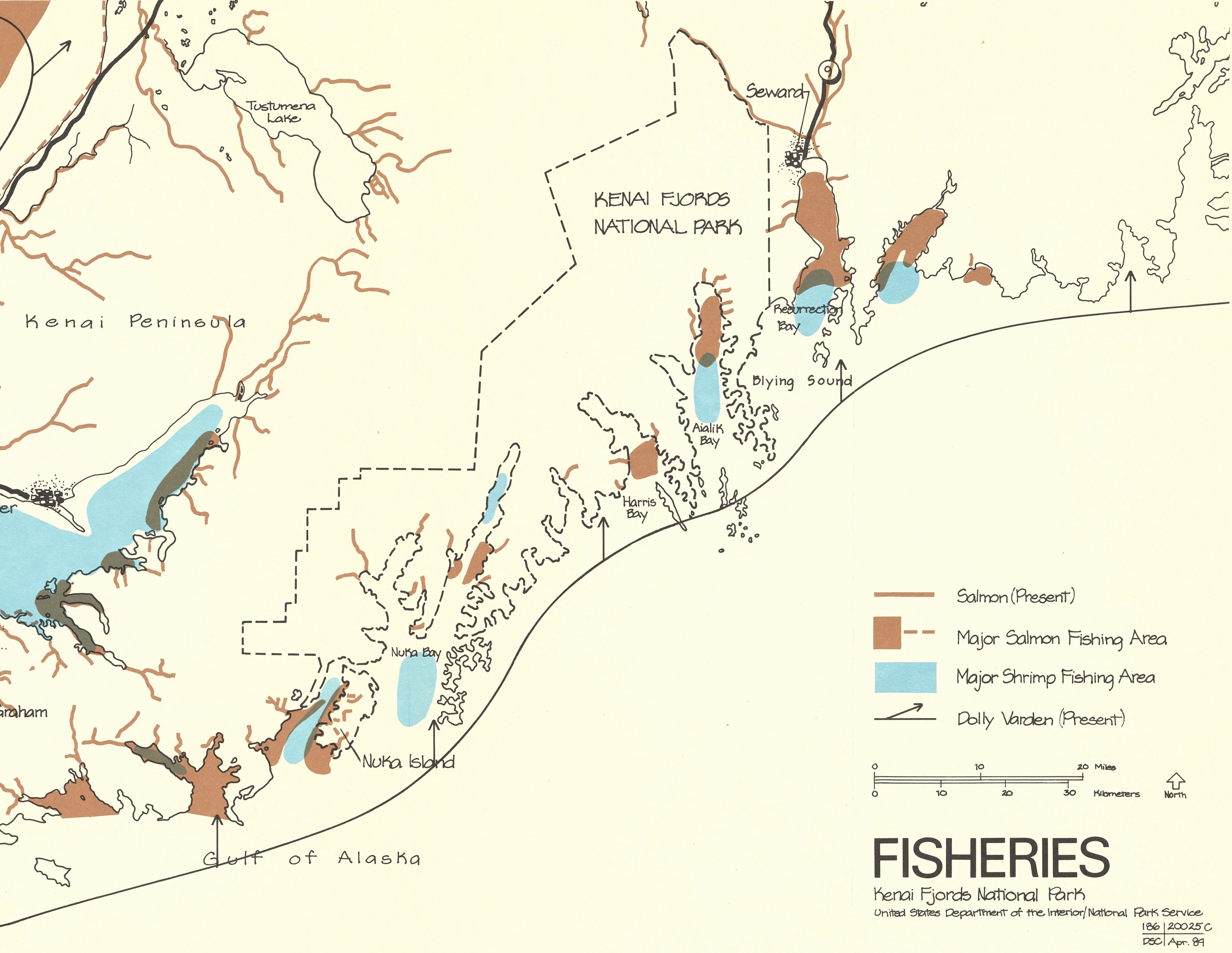
A 1989 National Park Service fisheries map for Kenai Fjords National Park and the surrounding area, with the location Nuka Island indicated.

Nuka Island is an island in the northern Gulf of Alaska in Kenai Peninsula Borough, Alaska, United States. It lies just off the southeastern corner of the Kenai Peninsula, across the Nuka Pass from the mainland. The island has a land area of 62.271 km^{2} (24.043 sq mi) and is unpopulated.

== Demographics ==
Historical population
Census	Pop.	Note	%±
1940	40		—
U.S. Decennial Census

Nuka Island reported a population as an unincorporated entity separately on the 1940 U.S. Census. This was the only time it reported as such.

== Sources ==
- Nuka Island: Block 1131, Census Tract 12, Kenai Peninsula Borough, Alaska United States Census Bureau
