= Suemez Island =

Island in Alaska, United States

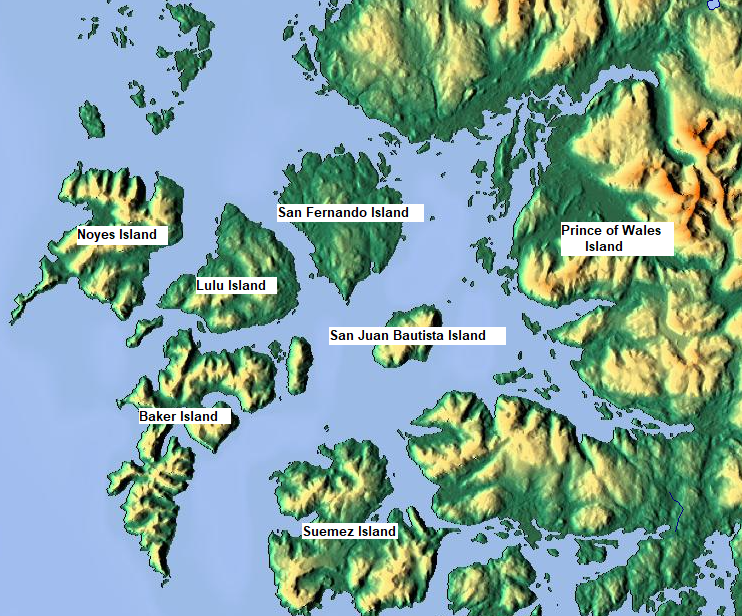
Suemez Island is to the west of Prince of Wales Island

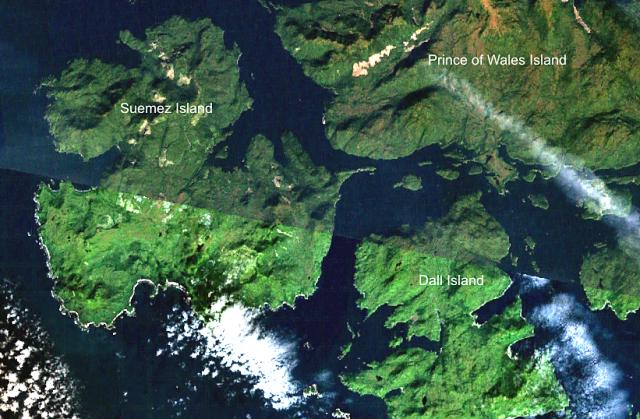
Satellite image of Suemez Island and nearby islands

Suemez Island is located in the Alexander Archipelago of southeastern Alaska, United States. It resides in the west-central coast of Prince of Wales Island. The northern tip of Dall Island lies to its southeast, while Baker Island lies to its northwest. Suemez Island has a land area of 151.713 km^{2} (58.5768 sq mi) and was unpopulated at the 2000 census.

The Tlevak Strait-Suemez Island volcano at 55°15′0″N, 133°18′0″W is 50 metres (164 feet) high.

Suemez Island was named sometime between 1775 and 1779 by Juan Francisco de la Bodega y Quadra and Francisco Antonio Mourelle as "Isla Suemez". Dionisio Alcalá Galiano called it "Guemes" in his map published in 1802, which may be the proper spelling. The name "Guemes" honors Juan Vicente de Güemes Padilla Horcasitas y Aguayo, Viceroy of New Spain from 1789 to 1794.

It is the only place in the world where the Suemez Island ermine (Mustela haidarum seclusa) can be found.
