= North Island (Alaska) =

Island in Alaska

- Location within Alaska

Geography
- Location: Whitewater Bay
- Coordinates: 57°14′26″N 134°33′54″W

Administration
- United States
- State: Alaska

North Island is a small island in Whitewater Bay, near southwestern Admiralty Island, Alaska. It is part of the Alexander Archipelago. It was once known as Head Island. The island was described at one point, as having "faces on all the rocks" at one time. (referring to petroglyphs)

== See also ==
- List of islands of Alaska
