= Powder Island =

Powder Island (69°32′S 68°47′W) is a small island lying 8 nautical miles (15 km) south-southeast of Cape Jeremy and 2 nautical miles (3.7 km) off the west coast of Palmer Land, in George VI Sound. First surveyed in 1948 by the Falkland Islands Dependencies Survey (FIDS), and so named by them because of the friable nature of the rock found on the island.

== See also ==
- List of Antarctic and sub-Antarctic islands
