= Alaska Roadless Rule =

Environmental protection policy in Alaska

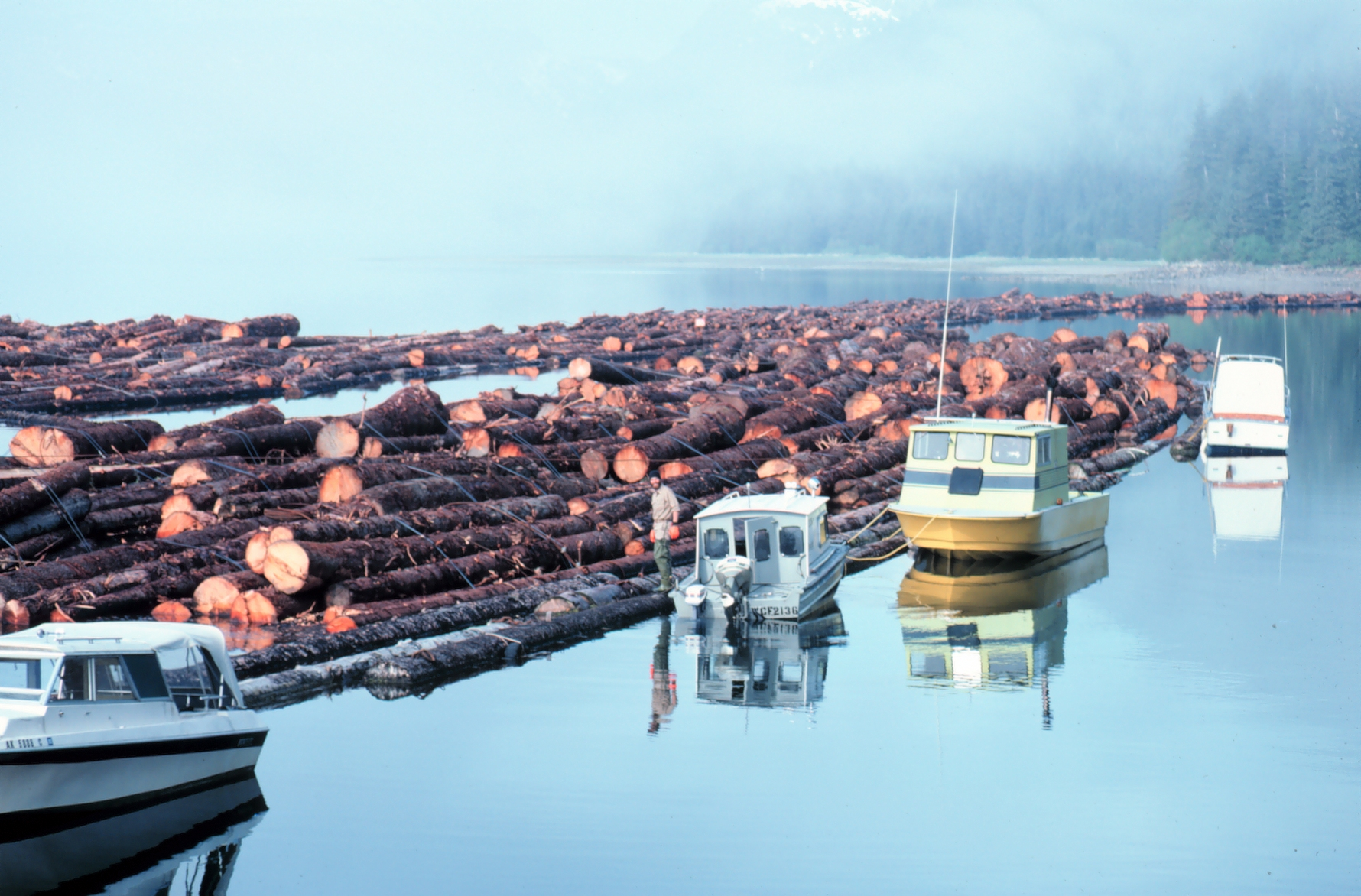
Logs rafted for towing in Alaska

The Alaska Roadless Rule is an environmental conservation policy that placed significant restrictions on timber removal and road construction or reconstruction in Inventoried roadless areas, which protects about half of the Tongass National Forest and Chugach National Forest's 17 million acres. The Alaska Roadless Rule stems directly from the Roadless Area Conservation Rule in which the United States Forest Service identified areas of natural importance as Inventoried roadless areas and announced the Forest Service 2001 Roadless Rule.

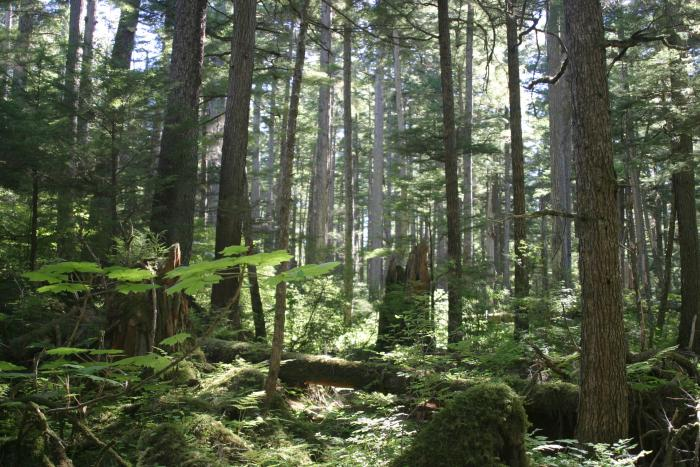
Tongass National Forest

== Intent ==
The forty-ninth state is one of immense cultural, biodiverse, and economic importance both historically and currently. From 1867, when Alaska was purchased from Russia, to the late 1980s, the timber industry was prominent in Southeast Alaska. Prior to the introduction of the Alaska pulp mill industry, the Southeast trees were mainly harvested for local uses such as home infrastructure and heating, then later fishing and logging populations. At the end of the 1910s, nearly all logging was executed on the now Tongass National Forest and exported 15 million feet annually. World War 1 and World War 2 brought an immense need for Tongass wood products to build items like airplanes out of Sitka Spruce before they were replaced by metals. The 1950s marked a turning point for Southeast Alaska when the Forest service approved large-scale pulp mill development for the Tongass National Forest. Alaska's timber and lumber exports increased throughout the 1960s until its decline in the mid-1980s. The start of the 1990s left southeast Alaskan communities with damaged salmon watersheds, undesirable logging roads, and a need for a new way of economic success.

== Timeline ==
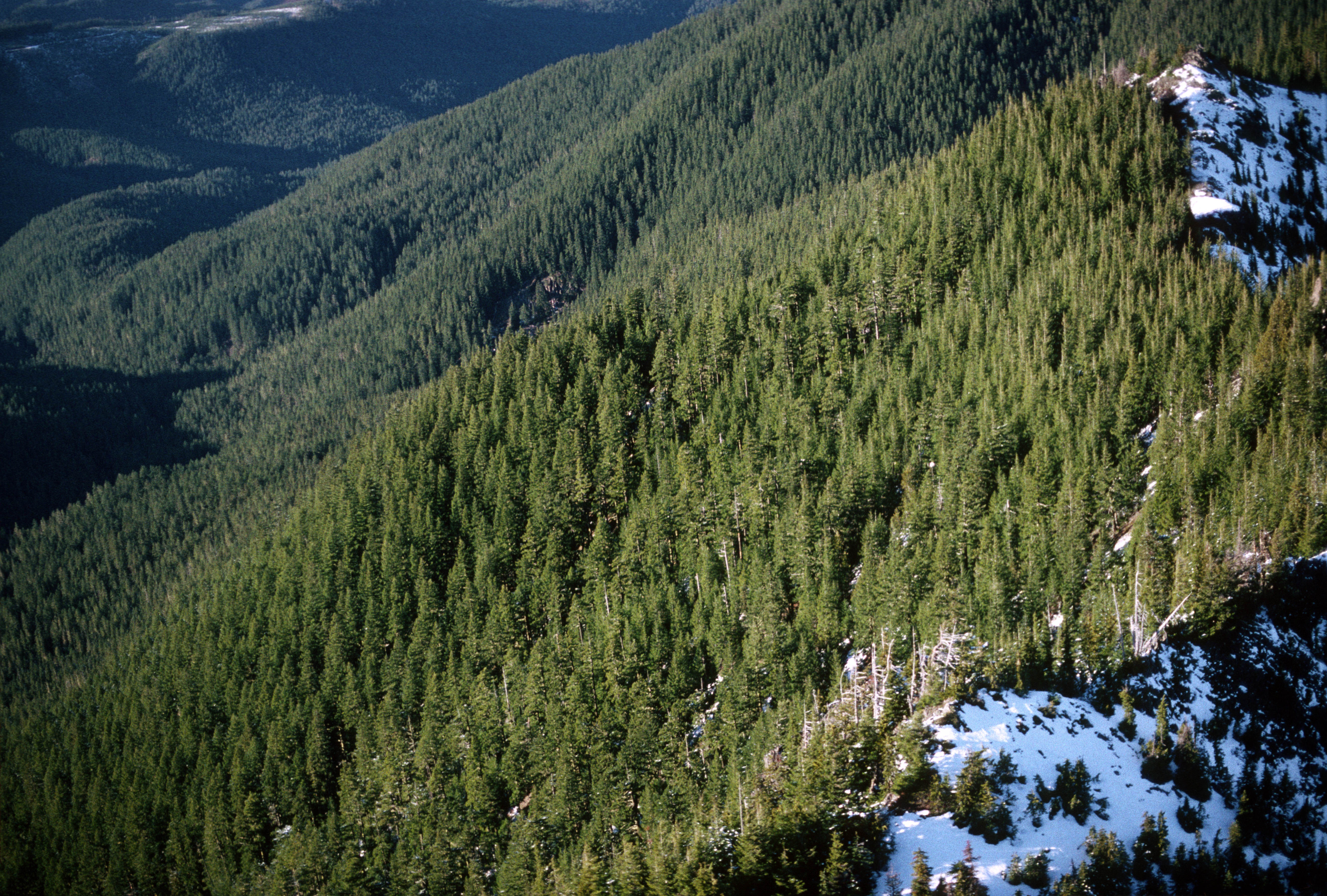
Mount Hood in Inventoried Roadless Area

Prior to the decision to create the Alaska Roadless Rule, in 1998, the U.S. Forest Service Chief, Michael Dombeck, proposed to institute an eighteen-month road-building moratorium on one hundred and thirty National Forests which came into effect in 1999. In January 2001, President Bill Clinton in his last few days in office issued the Roadless Area Conservation Policy ending almost all logging, mineral leasing, and road-building on 58 million acres of National Forest lands. This rule was widely supported by United States citizens by receiving over 1.6 million public comments and over 60 public hearings.

The State of Alaska then promptly filed a lawsuit challenging to be exempt from the Roadless Rule until 2004. The proposed rule was also largely challenged by the timber industry. Upon the election of President George W. Bush at the end of January, he announced a delay of all regulations created during the final days of the Clinton administration; the Roadless Rule being one of them.

On June 3, 2003, the administration announced that they would settle the case brought by the State of Alaska and exempt the Tongass National Forest and later the Chugach National Forest from the Roadless Rule. Following this decision, many environmental organizations petitioned to have the Roadless Rule reinstated on the grounds that Alaska's ecosystems are vital to the well-being of all. A turning point for Alaska came on March 4, 2011, over a decade after the Clinton-era decision, as the Alaska District Court decided to vacate the 2003 Tongass and later Chugach exemption and reinstate the Roadless Rule in Alaska. The State of Alaska then challenged this exemption and the District of Columbia District Court later determined that there would be no further challenges regarding the Roadless Rule because the statute of limitation had run out

== Alaska Specific Roadless Rule ==
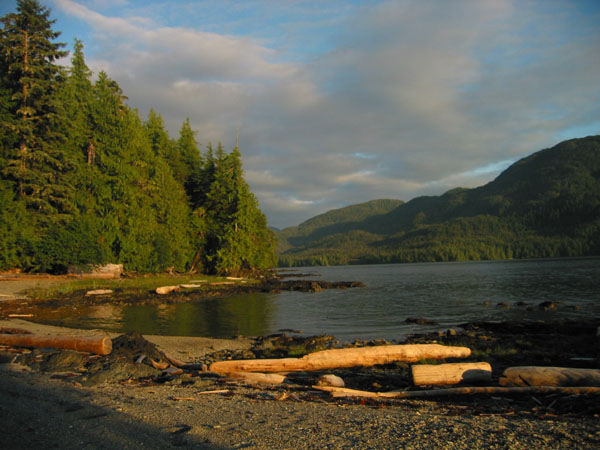
Unknown Bay in Tongass National Forest

On August 2, 2018, the U.S. Department of Agriculture announced that they were tasking the Forest Service Alaska Region 10 to create an Alaska Specific Roadless Rule. This was done with the intent to acknowledge the unique natural and wild glaciers, forests, streams and diverse ecosystems. The Alaska Region then presented 6 alternative rules in collaboration with Alaska Native Tribes through formal consultation and other community representatives and leaders.

The six alternatives ranged from a no action alternative, adding or taking away inventoried roadless areas, and a complete exemption alternative. These alternatives were presented to the Southeast Alaska communities and were open to receive public comment at the end of the year 2019. However, in June 2019, President Donald Trump and the governor of Alaska, Mike Dunleavy (politician), had a 25-minute talk on Air Force One and discussed the future of Alaska including the topic of deciding on Alternative 6, the repeal of the Roadless Rule in Alaska.

This decision became official in October 2019, when the USDA announced that the new "Alaska Roadless Rule" would be a full exemption of the Roadless Rule on Tongass and Chugach National Forest lands. Following the announcement, on December 23, 2019, Earthjustice and co-council of the Natural Resources Defense Council filed a lawsuit in federal court representing five Alaska Native Tribes, Alaska small businesses and other local organizations.

== Biden administration ==
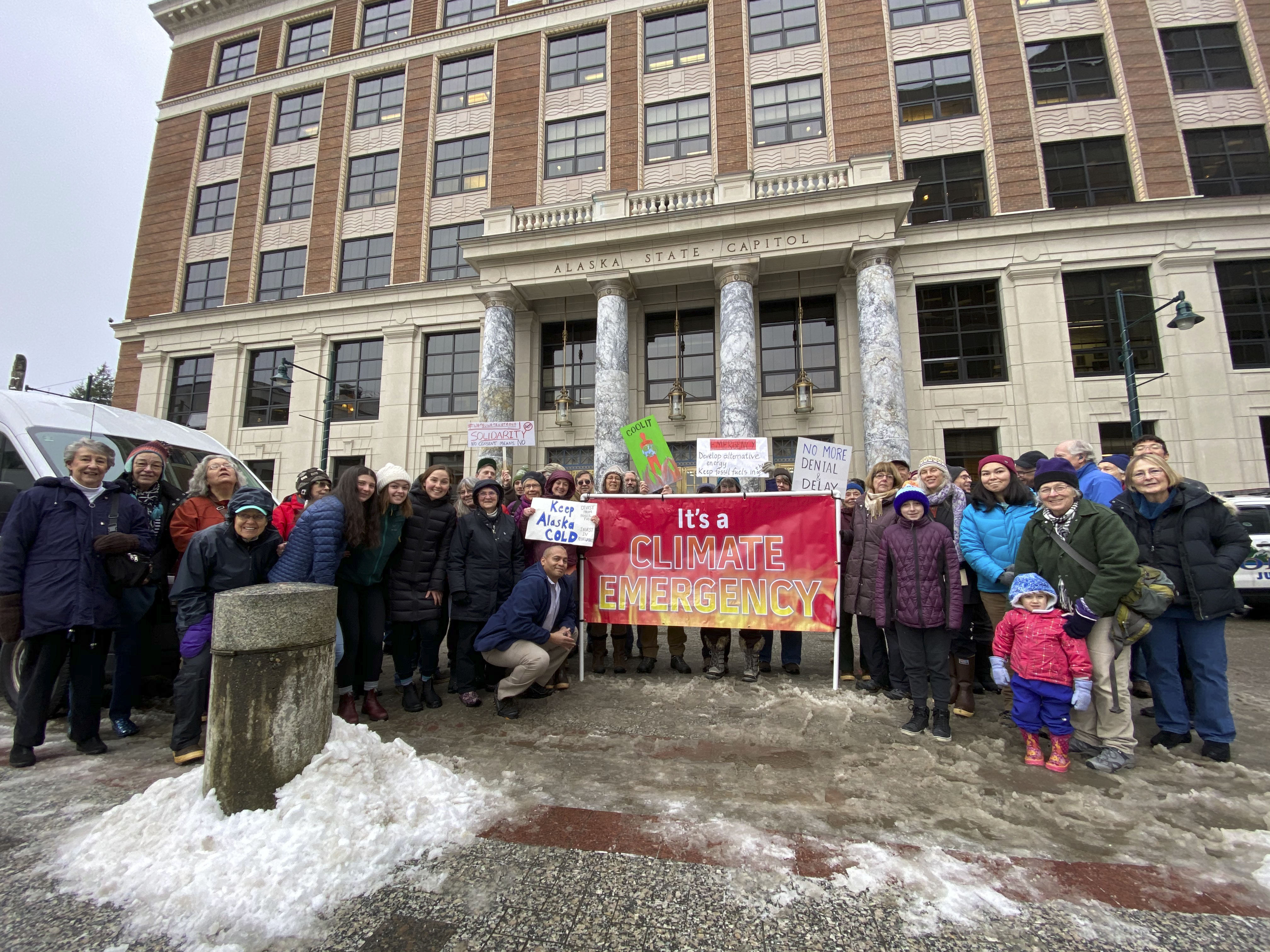
Climate Emergency Rally at Alaska State Capitol Building 2021

Following his 2021 inauguration, President Joe Biden ordered all executive departments and agencies to review any federal regulations made in the previous four years that harmed the environment. This decision was made with his initiative to combat climate change and had the Alaska Roadless Rule as an immediate concern.

The Alaska Roadless Rule was then placed under a public comment period at the end of 2021, which received over 122,000 public comments in response to the repeal of the 2020 Trump administration Roadless Rule and return to the Clinton-era 2001 Roadless Rule. On July 21, 2021, the USDA also announced the Southeast Alaska Sustainability Strategy (SASS), an initiative to support a diverse economy, to invest back into Southeast Alaska and conserve its natural resources. Within the SASS initiative, there is also an effort to bring back Roadless Rule protections in the Tongass and Chugach National Forests

In January 2023, the USDA's final rule repealed the 2020 Alaska Roadless Rule. As a result, the inventoried roadless areas of the forest are returned to management under the 2001 Roadless Rule. Road construction, reconstruction, and timber harvest in those areas will be generally prohibited.
