= Baker Island (Alaska) =

Island in Alaska, United States

Coordinates: 55°22′N 133°36′W

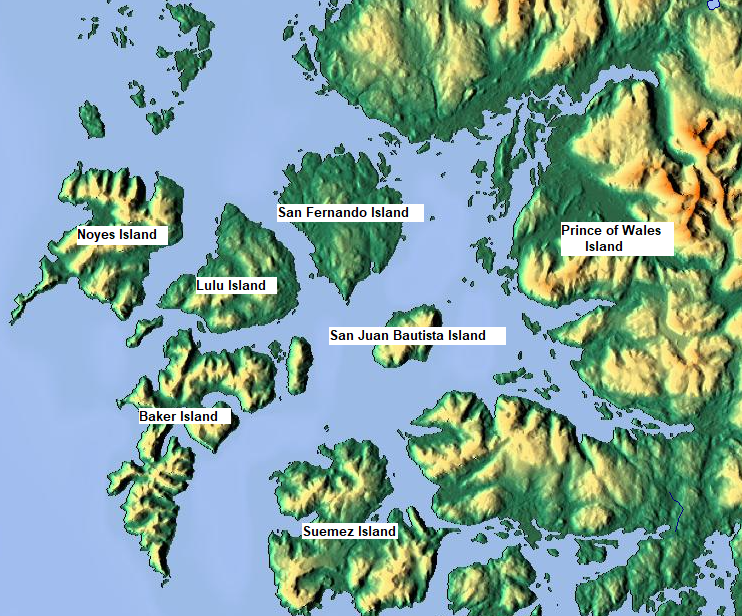

Baker Island is an island in the Alexander Archipelago of southeastern Alaska, United States. It lies off the central west coast of Prince of Wales Island. Its closest significant island neighbors are Noyes Island to its northwest, Lulu Island directly to its north, and Suemez Island across Bucareli Bay to its southeast. The smaller San Juan Bautista Island and St. Ignace Island separate it from Prince of Wales Island and its nearest community, Craig. The island has a land area of 44.44 square miles (115.1 km^{2}) and is uninhabited.

The first European to sight the island was Aleksei Chirikov in 1741. It was named by William Healy Dall of the United States Coast and Geodetic Survey in 1879 after Marcus Baker (1849–1903).
