= Dolgoi Island =

Coordinates: 55°07′28″N 161°44′39″W

Dolgoi Island (Anganax̂six̂) is the largest of the Pavlof Islands lying off the southwest coast of the state of Alaska in the United States. It has a land area of 107.4 km^{2} (41.47 sq mi) and is uninhabited. All of the Pavlof Islands are part of Aleutians East Borough.
