= Dall Island =

Island off the southeast coast of Alaska, US

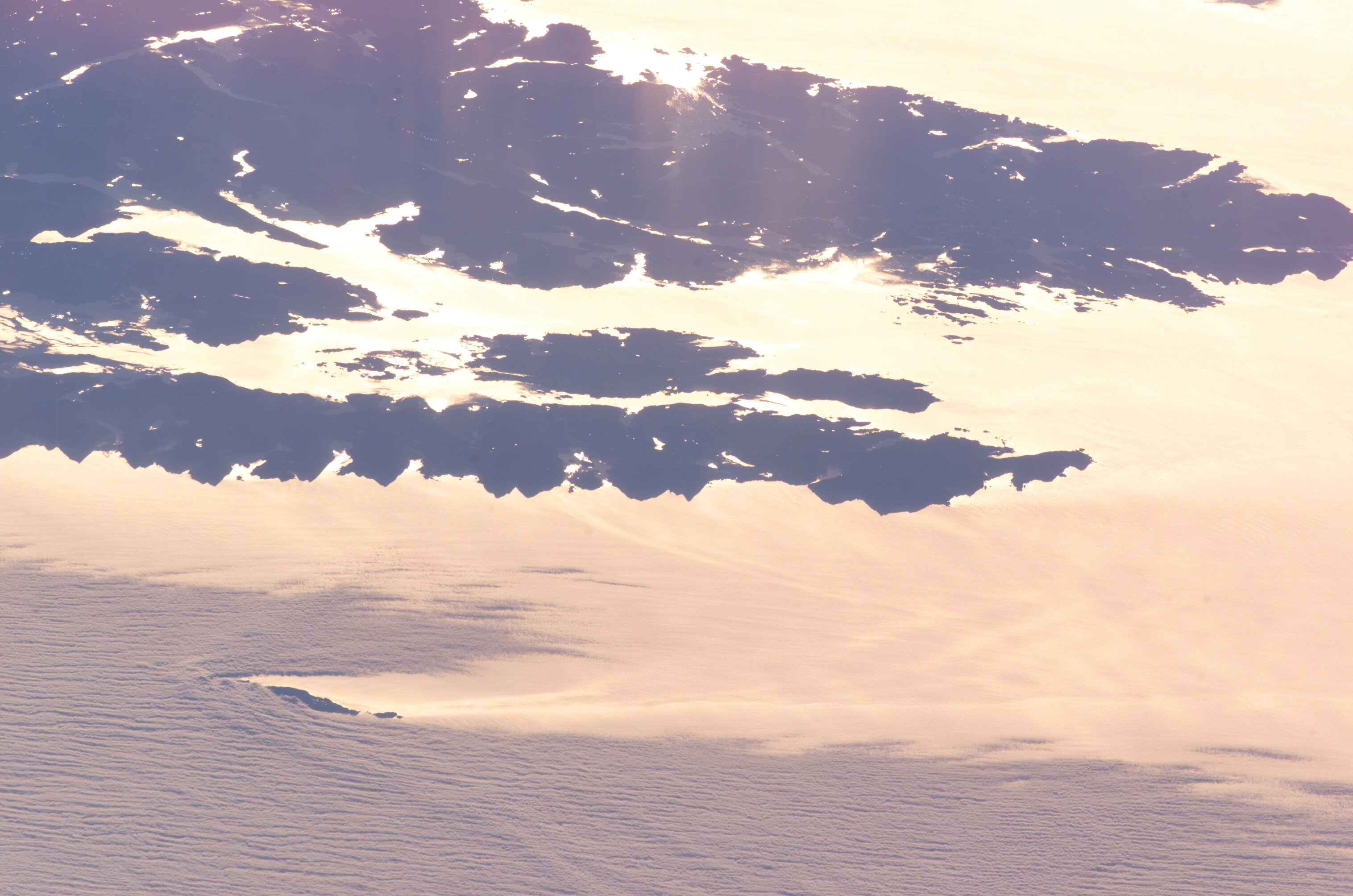
- Dall island and Cordova Bay photographed from Earth orbit
- Interactive map of Dall Island

Geography
- Location: Alaska
- Coordinates: 54°57′22″N 133°03′33″W
- Archipelago: Alexander
- Area: 254.02 sq mi (657.9 km^{2})
- Highest elevation: 2,443 ft (744.6 m)

Administration
- United States, Canada (point at tip)

Demographics
- Population: 20 (2000)
- Pop. density: 0.03/km^{2} (0.08/sq mi)

Dall Island is an island in the Alexander Archipelago off the southeast coast of Alaska, just west of Prince of Wales Island and north of Canadian waters. Its peak elevation is 2,443 feet (745 meters) above sea level. Its land area is 254.0 square miles (657.9 km^{2}), making it the 28th largest island in the United States. Dall is used economically for fishing and limestone quarrying.

== Population and demographics ==
The 2000 census recorded 20 people living on the island. The Haida are known to have inhabited coastal caves on the island two to three thousand years ago.

== History ==
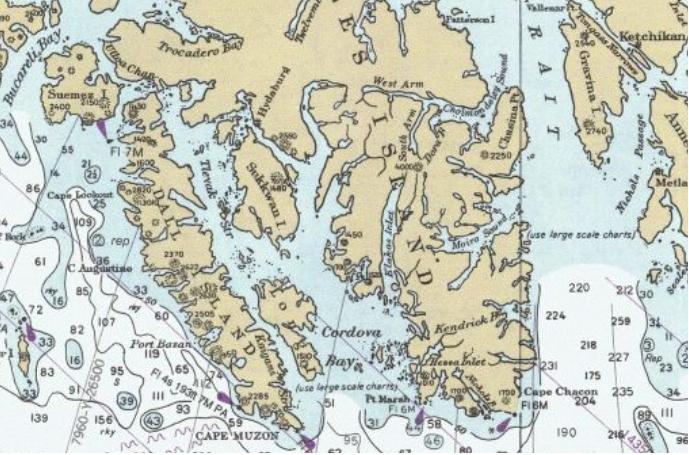
Dall Island lies west of the southern part of Prince of Wales Island, and forms the western shore of Cordova Bay, Kaigani Strait, and Tlevak Strait. NOAA Office of Coast Survey 1993 chart detail.

Dall Island was first called "Quadra," after Juan Francisco de la Bodega y Quadra, until 1879, when it was renamed in honor of naturalist William H. Dall. The island was also considered part of Prince of Wales Island as recently as 1903.

During the maritime fur trade era, harbors on southeast Dall Island, collectively known as Kaigani, were among the most popular sites for trade between fur trading ships and the Kaigani Haida.

Cape Muzon, the southernmost point of the island, is the western terminus, known as Point A, of the A–B Line, which marks the marine boundary between the state of Alaska and the Canadian province of British Columbia, per the position of the Canadian government on the decision of the arbitration tribunal under the Alaska Boundary Treaty of 1903. This line is also the northern boundary of the waters known as the Dixon Entrance. Cape Muzon was established as the "point of commencement" of the international boundary between Russia and British North America in the Anglo-Russian Convention of 1825. The United States Coast and Geodetic Survey charts produced in 1884 and 1894–95 laid the boundary line with Canada from Cape Muzon through Dixon Entrance and Portland Canal. In its decision on the delimitation of the disputed Alaska Panhandle boundary, the six-judge 1903 Court of Arbitration unanimously agreed that Cape Muzon was the initial point of the boundary and designated Point A as one endpoint of the A–B Line.

Canada considers Point A (54°39′43.993″N 132°41′3.093″W) as part of the delimited international boundary, just like the other defined turning points outlined in 1903 for the resolved boundary. Furthermore, Canada regards the A–B line as defining Canada's internal waters within the Dixon Entrance. On the other hand, the U.S. considers the A–B line as having been described to allocate sovereignty over the land masses within the Dixon Entrance, with Canada's land to the south of the line. In contrast, it considers the waters subject to international marine law.

== Logging ==
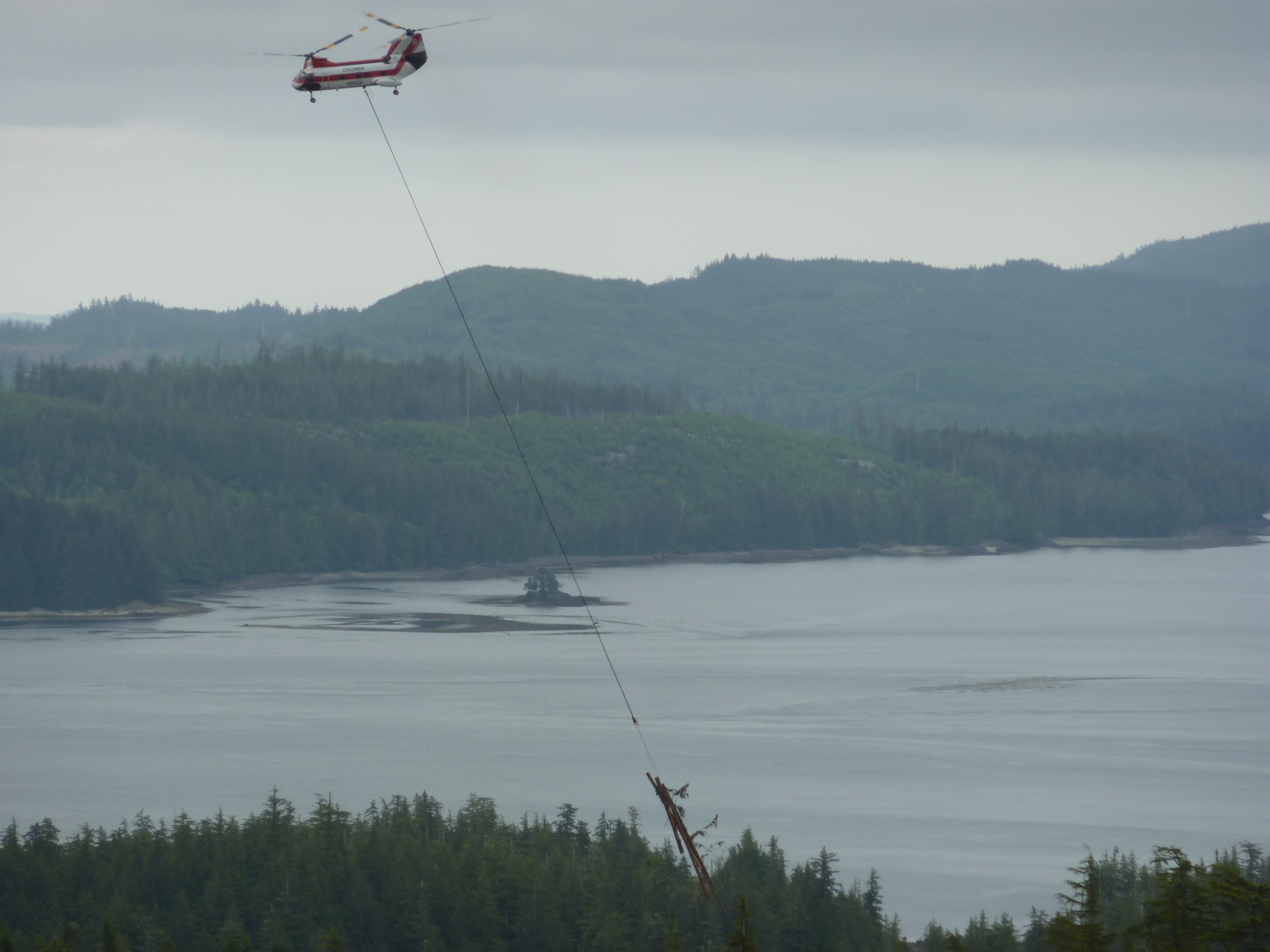
Helicopter logging on the island

Dall Island is also an island used for its timber resources. The island houses many logging camps. Columbia Helicopters of Oregon is one of the leading companies using the island for timber.
