= Fairway Island (Alaska) =

Island in Southeast Alaska, United States

Coordinates: 56°2′25″N 134°3′13″W

Fairway Island is an island located south of Kuiu Island and north of Coronation Island in the Sumner Strait, Southeast Alaska, United States. The island is 14 kilometers from Coronation Island and is about 32 square meters in size. The island is mostly rocky, with a vegetated surface and plenty of trees. There are some rocks protruding around it.

== Geography ==
Fairway Island is a small, low island at the entrance to Affleck Canal off the southeastern coast of Kuiu Island in Alaska. Its elevation is around 26 ft (8 m) above sea level. The island marks the navigable channel or "fairway" into the canal. It is surrounded by the waters of Sumner Strait and sits amidst the rugged, forested terrain typical of the southeastern Alaskan coast. Latitude: 56.040263 | Longitude: -134.053538

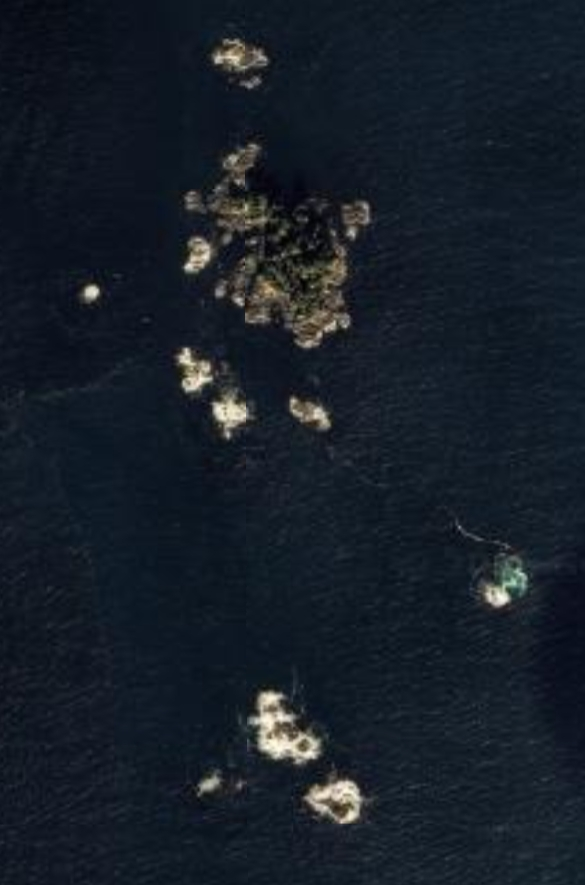
Fairway Island from satellite

== History ==
In 1886, Lieutenant Commander A. S. Snow (Albert S. Snow) took command of the survey steamer Patterson and carried out surveying in southeast Alaska, including charting many of the channels, bays, and straits in that region. Finding the island, he gave it the name "Fairway" because it marks the safe navigational path.

== See also ==
- Fairway Rock, a nearby rock with a like name.
