= Fairway Island =

Fairway Island may refer to:

== Places ==
- Fairway Island, Nunavut - an uninhabited island in Hudson Bay, now known as Pitsiulartok
- Fairway Island, Chile - island in the Strait of Magellan and site of the Aug. 3, 1940 disaster of the Chilean passenger ferry Moraleda, in which 67 passengers lost their lives.
- Fairway Island, Alaska - a small island in the eastern part of Peril Strait
- Fairway Island (Alaska) - a small island located in Sumner Strait
- Fairway Island, a small islet off Bagga Island, in the Solomon Islands

== Other uses ==
- Fairway Island, an 1892 novel by Horace Gordon Hutchinson
