= Star of Bengal =

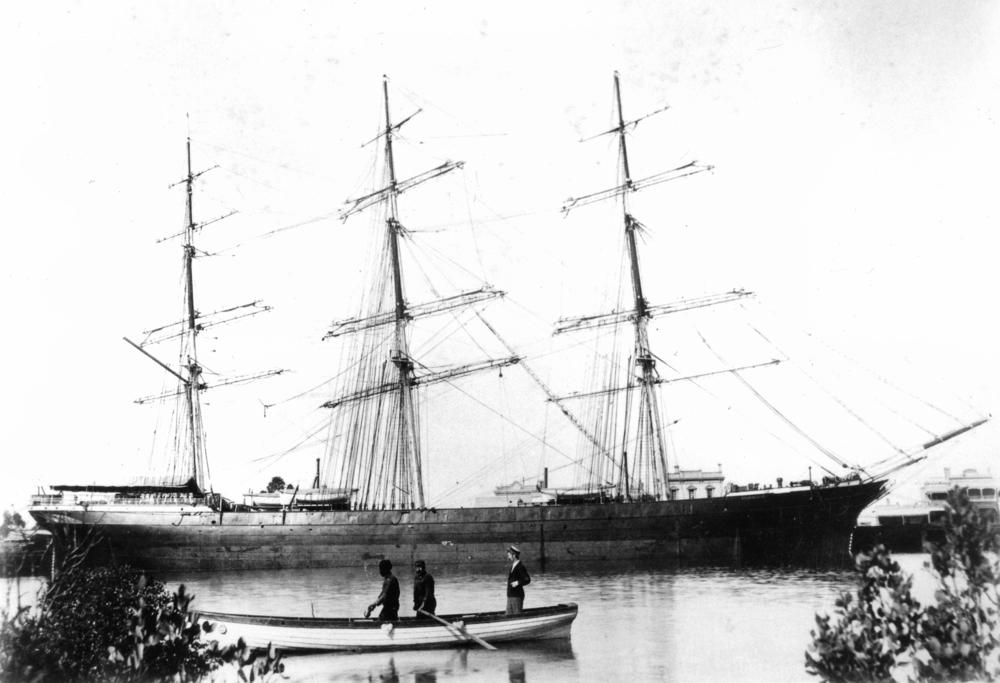

History

United Kingdom
- Owner: J.P. Corry & Co.
- Port of registry: Belfast
- Builder: Harland and Wolff
- Laid down: 1873
- Completed: January 3, 1874
- Maiden voyage: London–Melbourne (April 25, 1874)
- Identification: British registry number 63957; Code letters MRCH
- Fate: Sold to J.J. Smith Co. in June 1898

History

United States
- Owner: 1898–1905: J.J. Smith; 1905–1908: Alaska Packers' Association
- Port of registry: San Francisco
- Refit: Repaired and re-rigged as barque in 1898
- Identification: US Official Number 116974; Code letters KQCM
- Fate: Sunk at Coronation Island on September 20, 1908

General characteristics
- Type: 1874–1898: full-rigged ship; 1898–1908: barque
- Tonnage: 1,877 GRT, 1,694 NRT, deadweight 2,530 long tons (2,570 t)
- Length: 262.8 feet (80.1 m)
- Beam: 40.2 feet (12.3 m)
- Draught: 21 feet 3 inches (6.48 m) (loaded)
- Depth: 23.5 feet (7.2 m)
- Propulsion: wind
- Crew: 17

The Star of Bengal was an iron three-masted 1,877 GRT merchant sailing vessel built in Belfast in 1874 by Harland and Wolff Industries (the shipyard that later constructed the Titanic). Though built towards the end of the Age of Sail, she was successfully operated for 24 years by the British trading company J.P. Corry & Co. The ship mainly travelled on the London-Calcutta trading route, but made a few voyages to Australian and American ports.

Following a formative change in the shipping industry, J.P. Corry switched to steam vessels and sold its sailing fleet around 1898. At the same time, merchant shipping along the United States Pacific Coast was experiencing a boom triggered by Klondike and Nome gold rushes intensifying the colonization of the Pacific Northwest and increasing the demand for both passenger and cargo shipping in the area. As a result, the Star of Bengal was purchased by San Francisco trading company J.J. Smith & Co. and, along with many other old European vessels, taken around Cape Horn to the Pacific Ocean. J.J. Smith conducted an overhaul of the ship and re-rigged her from a full-rigged ship to a barque to decrease operating costs.

J.J. Smith operated the Star of Bengal for 7 more years, mainly hauling grain and coal. As steamships pushed sailing vessels out of business, the trading company could no longer operate her for profit, and in 1905, the Star of Bengal was sold to the Alaska Packers' Association. This company used its sailing ships for a single voyage a year: a spring sail carrying seasonal workers and supplies from San Francisco to one of its Alaskan canneries, followed by a return trip in early fall with the workers and a load of canned salmon.

On September 20, 1908, at the beginning of her return trip from Fort Wrangell to San Francisco, the Star of Bengal was in tow in open sea when she encountered a storm. The ship struck the rocks near the shore of Coronation Island and sunk, killing approximately 110 of 138 people aboard. Captain Nicholas Wagner survived the wreck and publicly blamed the tugboat captains for the event. After months of federal investigation, no one was held responsible. As of 2015, the wreck of the Star of Bengal remains among the top five worst maritime disasters in Alaskan history.

Later, Captain Wagner's daughter, Joan Lowell, pursued literary career, that led to the Star of Bengal's portrayal in fiction. Her book The Cradle of the Deep, was the third-bestselling book of 1929 and contained an embellished account of the wreck. A melodramatic play, Star of Bengal, written by Thompson Buchanan and produced by Christopher Morley, is also set on the ship.

== Specifications ==
The Star of Bengal was built by shipbuilder Harland and Wolff Industries (Note: Harland and Wolff Industries later built the Titanic.) in Belfast, Ireland, in 1873 and 1874. Those were the years when the construction of three-masted iron ships reached its zenith, and the shipbuilding industry produced a series of the fastest ships in this category, the Star of Bengal being one of them.

Initially constructed as a two-deck three-masted full-rigged ship, in 1898 the Star of Bengal was re-rigged as a barque. Her gross tonnage was 1877, net tonnage 1694, and tonnage under deck, 1684. She was 262.8 feet (80.1 m) long, 40.2 feet (12.3 m) wide and 23.5 feet (7.2 m) deep, and designed to be operated by a crew of seventeen. The ship could load 2,530 long tons (2,570 t) of deadweight cargo on a draught of 21 feet 3 inches (6.48 m).

The Star of Bengal had a 9-inch-deep (230 mm) bar keel. Her poop deck was 64 feet (20 m) long and forecastle, 42 feet (13 m) long. The ship's moulded depth was 25 feet 3 inches (7.70 m) with freeboard (Note: Measured amidship in the summer.) of 5 feet 2.5 inches (158.8 cm). She was originally constructed with three cement bulkheads, but after her overhaul in 1898, only one bulkhead remained in service. Overall, the ship's hull required 200 long tons (200 t) of stiffening.

== History of operations ==
=== J.P. Corry & Co. ===
The Star of Bengal's sample cargo manifest

Arrived from London to Melbourne on January 27, 1891:

6 tnks 30 bgs seeds, 2 bls fibre, 100 cs blue, 5 cs leaf tobacco, 25 bls 1 cs tobacco, 3 cs plate glass, 64 brls cod oil, 8 tnks 20 bgs cocoa, 2 hnds 24 qr-cks rum. 30 brls sugar, 22 bls dundees, 6 tnks malt, 40 cks 200 cs blacking, 1235 cs vestas, 18 cs marble, 172 bgs valonia, 280 cs pickles, 13 anvils. 19 vices, 285 grindstones, 100 share plates, 20 cs liquorice, 124 plough plates, 5 cs plate glass, 400 bgs fertiliser, 4 pkgs loom gear, 370 cs watches, 356 tns 1 cwt, 1 qr old railway chairs, 250 cs spirits, 30 cs cherry brandy, 12 tnks soap, 25 cs bedsteads, 37 cs wool, 11 cs dry photo plates, 32 axles, 476 pigs lead, 2 cs elastic web, 334 brls whiting, 20 pkgs saltpetre, 226 bls 72 rls 175 cs paper. 1125 pkgs soft goods, 23 pkgs grindery, 844 pkgs oils and paints and painters' material, 2246 cs bottled beer, 275 cs whisky, 5 hhds 44 qr-cks 4 octvs 244 cs wine, 150 qr-cks 50 octvs brandy 40 tnks 2494 pkgs oilmen's stores, 643 pkgs drugs, 2201 brs 295 bdls 98 plts iron, 150 cs galvanised iron, 686 bdls steel, 317 bdls, 24 single tubes, 132 pkgs paperhangings, 84 pkgs furniture, 1049 pkgs hardware, 1086 pkgs wire netting, 13 pkgs castings, 25 pkgs machinery, 48 pkgs china, glass and earthenware, 255 cs glass bottles, 36 pkgs fancy goods, 57 pkgs printing material, 71 pkgs stationery, 15 pkgs books, 14 cs pianos, 1170 cks cement, 4 cs show cards, 17 pkgs 500 cks effects and sundries.

— The Age

The Star of Bengal was ordered by shipping company J.P. Corry & Co., which was founded in Belfast and headquartered in London. At the time of her launch on January 3, 1874, the Star of Bengal was the largest vessel in gross tonnage in service of J.P. Corry & Co. (in December 1874, she was surpassed by the 1,981 GT Star of Russia). These two Stars remained the company's largest sailing vessels. The Star of Bengal's maiden voyage officially began on April 25, 1874, when she sailed out of London towards Melbourne. She continued to San Francisco and returned to Liverpool.

The company's sailing vessels operated three main trading routes, linking London with Canada, India, and Australia. The Star of Bengal largely remained on the London-Calcutta route, with occasional visits to Melbourne, Bombay, and Valparaíso. The ship's average time for the London-Calcutta-London round-trip was 7 months and 24 days. The shortest trip was 7 months and 2 days, and the longest 8 months and 14 days.

John Smyth was the Star of Bengal's first captain. He remained at this position for eleven years, until he took command of another company ship, the Star of Erin in 1885. He eventually graduated to commanding large company steamers, earning the unofficial title of "the commodore of the Star fleet."

William Legg became the next Star of Bengal's captain in 1885. During the ship's 1886 voyage to Calcutta, the Scottish maritime novelist George Cupples sailed as the Star of Bengal's honorary first mate. The ship arrived in Calcutta on August 19, 1886; shortly after her arrival, the captain broke his leg. Under the circumstances, the 63-year-old novelist successfully assumed command. The Star of Bengal was about to leave India and sail out of Garden Reach, when on September 25, the steamship Gulf of Mexico collided with the moored Star of Bengal, resulting in a month of repairs. Cupples finally sailed out on October 26, bringing the Star of Bengal back to London on February 1, 1887.

Upon arrival, Cupples yielded the captain's position to DeGruchy, who remained the ship's captain for one voyage. In 1888, William Legg returned to the Star of Bengal's command. In 1892, after four more years of service, he was replaced by John M. Hart, formerly John Smyth's first mate. Hart remained in command of the ship until 1898, when J.P. Corry & Co.'s decision to put its money into steamers led to the sale of its last remaining sailing vessels, including the Star of Bengal.

The selected voyages with best timings of the Star of Bengal for J.P. Corry & Co.
Origin	Destination	Departure date	Arrival date	Timing (days)	Captain
London	Melbourne	April 25, 1874	July 15, 1874	81	J. Smyth
Melbourne	San Francisco	August 19, 1874	October 16, 1874	58	J. Smyth
San Francisco	Liverpool	March 4, 1875	June 23, 1875	111	J. Smyth
Calcutta	London	January 14, 1876	April 21, 1876	98	J. Smyth
London	Calcutta	June 30, 1876	September 25, 1876	87	J. Smyth
Calcutta	London	October 24, 1876	January 31, 1877	99	J. Smyth
London	Calcutta	March 24, 1877	June 25, 1877	93	J. Smyth
Calcutta	London	May 22, 1879	August 29, 1879	99	J. Smyth
Liverpool	Calcutta	August 26, 1884	December 3, 1884	99	W. Legg
Calcutta	London	December 17, 1885	March 25, 1886	98	W. Legg
London	Calcutta	May 22, 1886	August 19, 1886	89	W. Legg
Calcutta	London	October 26, 1886	February 1, 1887	98	G. Cupples
London	Melbourne	March 12, 1887	June 4, 1887	84	DeGruchy
Melbourne	Valparaíso	July 12, 1887	August 27, 1887	46	DeGruchy
Pisagua	Falmouth	November 2, 1887	January 23, 1888	82	DeGruchy
Cardiff	San Francisco	March 30, 1888	July 22, 1888	114	W. Legg
San Francisco	Falmouth	September 5, 1888	December 26, 1888	112	W. Legg
Liverpool	Calcutta	February 7, 1889	May 3, 1889	85	W. Legg
London	Melbourne	November 8, 1890	January 27, 1891	80	W. Legg
New Castle	Valparaíso	April 7, 1891	May 22, 1891	45	W. Legg
Hull	Algoa Bay	April 18, 1894	June 11, 1894	54	J. Hart
Swansea	Cape Town	May 30, 1896	July 30, 1896	61	J. Hart
Based on Basil Lubbock's compilation.

=== J.J. Smith & Co. ===
Re-rigging of the Star of Bengal

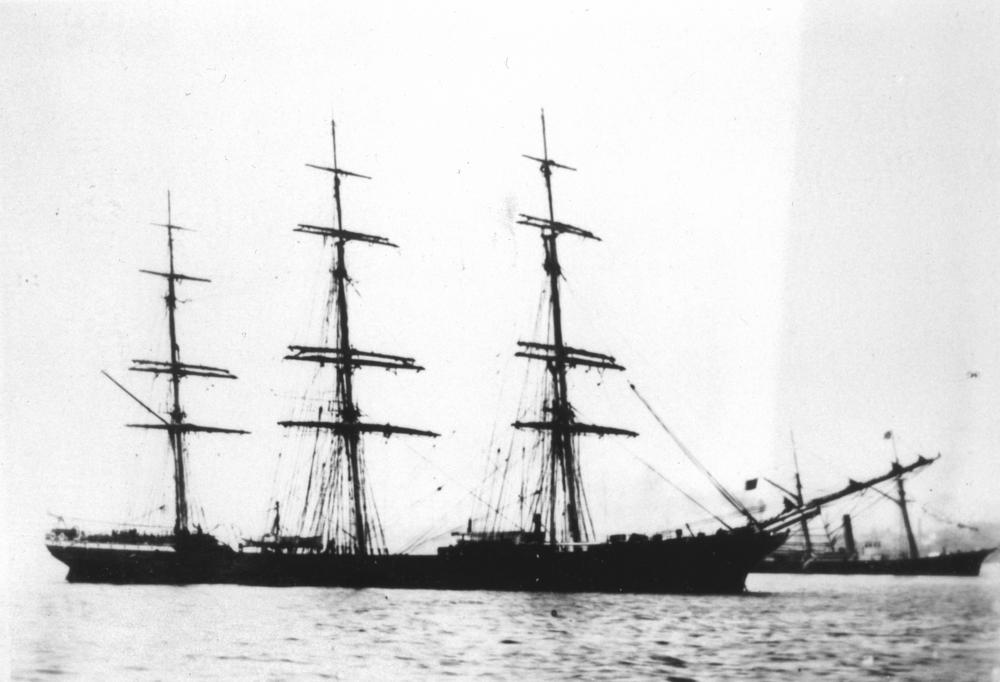
Full-rigged ship before 1898

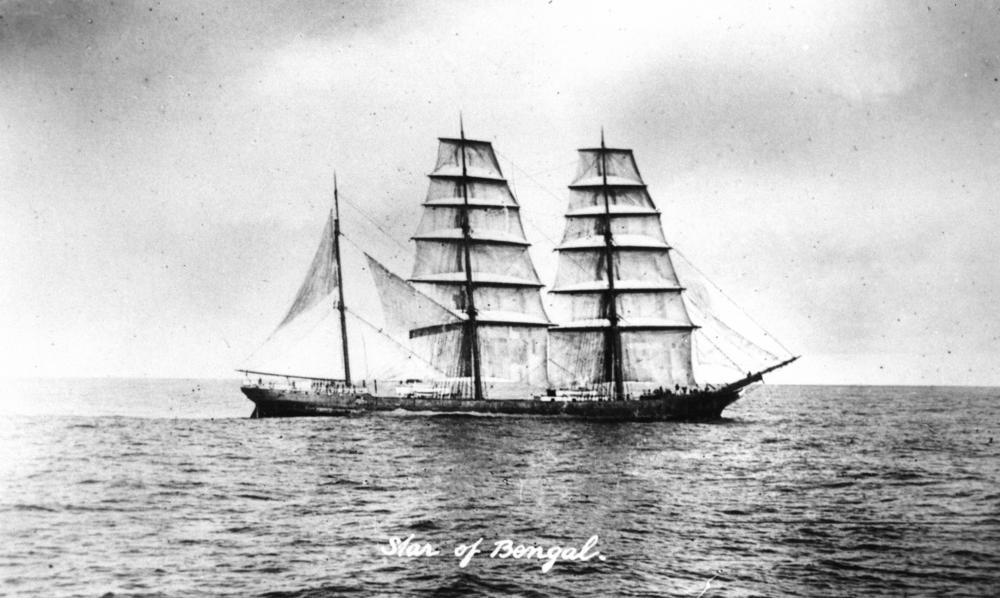
Barque after 1898

San Francisco-based trading company J.J. Smith & Co. acquired the Star of Bengal in June 1898. At that time, maritime shipping out of United States Pacific ports was undergoing a major change. After the impact of the Long Depression on regional shipping peaked in 1896–1897, the demand for Pacific Coast maritime transportation unexpectedly soared. It was driven by the Nome Gold Rush, which intensified the colonization of the Pacific Northwest and Alaska and created numerous opportunities for new passenger and trade routes. As a result, many old vessels were purchased to service these routes.

J.J. Smith & Co. re-registered the Star of Bengal in the United States, (Note: Technically, during her overhaul and repairs, the Star of Bengal was first registered in Hawaii. As Hawaii was integrating into United States, the ship's registration shortly became American, and then the ship was re-registered in San Francisco.) and in 1898, the 25-year-old ship underwent a major overhaul. To make the ship's operations more cost-effective, her mizzen-mast was re-rigged from square to fore-and-aft, and the Star of Bengal turned from a full-rigged ship to a barque. She got new decks, but the number of bulkheads in service decreased from three to one. In 1904, a donkey boiler was installed on the ship to assist the crew with raising sails.

While the Star of Bengal sailed under J.J. Smith & Co., her captain was H. Henderson. The company operated the ship on a variety of trading missions, mainly trading grain and coal. In an incident in March 1899, the ship almost caught fire when, from Newcastle to San Francisco, her load of coal overheated and became spontaneously combustible. In 1905, the J.J. Smith & Co. could no longer operate the Star of Bengal with profit and sold her to the Alaska Packers' Association.

=== Alaska Packers' Association ===
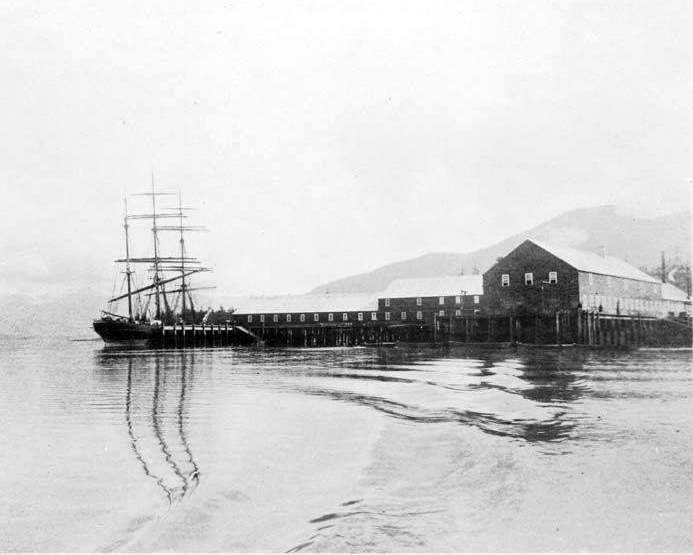
The Star of Bengal moored by Fort Wrangell cannery for the summer

The Alaska Packers' Association (APA) was another beneficiary of Alaskan exploration, and an active consumer of old vessels. Based in San Francisco, the company was engaged in Alaska salmon fishery; it operated salmon canneries across Alaska through a fleet of ships engaged in transporting packed salmon and fishery workers. The company purchased several iron sailing ships originally built for J.P. Corry & Co., including the Star of Bengal, and renamed all of its remaining ships by adding prefix "Star of-" to their names in an attempt to achieve instant name recognition. The APA became the largest company engaged in Alaskan salmon fisheries and, by 1908, the largest salmon-packing concern in the world.

Beginning in 1905, the Star of Bengal's captain was Nicholas Wagner. The company had the Star of Bengal insured by Lloyd's. In 1908, the ship was appraised between $70,000 and $75,000 ($1,900,000 and $2,000,000 in 2020 dollars (Note: The approximate value converted to 2020 dollars, based on a standard adjustment of the 1913 dollar value using the Consumer Price Index as calculated by United States Department of Labor.)). Taking advantage of "good strong old British iron" and "lower insurance rates," APA operated the ship seasonally: in the spring, she would sail from San Francisco to Alaska, bringing seasonal workers, fuel, and other supplies to the canneries; in the fall, she would sail back loaded with canned salmon and returning workers. In the winter, the Star of Bengal was moored at Alameda, California with other ships of the "Star fleet."

At the time, salmon canneries required cheap, unskilled labor, and the Alaska Packers' Association primarily hired immigrants of Chinese, Japanese, and Filipino descent as seasonal workers. These workers were provided in bulk by Chinese labor contractors operating out of San Francisco. On the company ships, "Orientals" were segregated from white workers and crew, in part due to separate habits and diet and because they were treated as second-class citizens. The APA supplied these workers with housing, fuel, and water, while Chinese labor contractors provided them with food, whiskey, and opium.

Additional wooden structures were added to the Star of Bengal's hold to accommodate seasonal workers. In addition to the workers and supplies, the ship could carry a maximum load of 85,000 48-pound (22 kg) cases of salmon, an equivalent of 2,040 short tons (1,850 t) of cargo. In 1906, the wholesale price of one case of salmon was $5.80, so the ship's full load of salmon represented $500,000 in 1906 dollars ($13,000,000 in 2020 dollars).

== Wreck ==
=== Background ===
Coronation Island on the map of Alaska

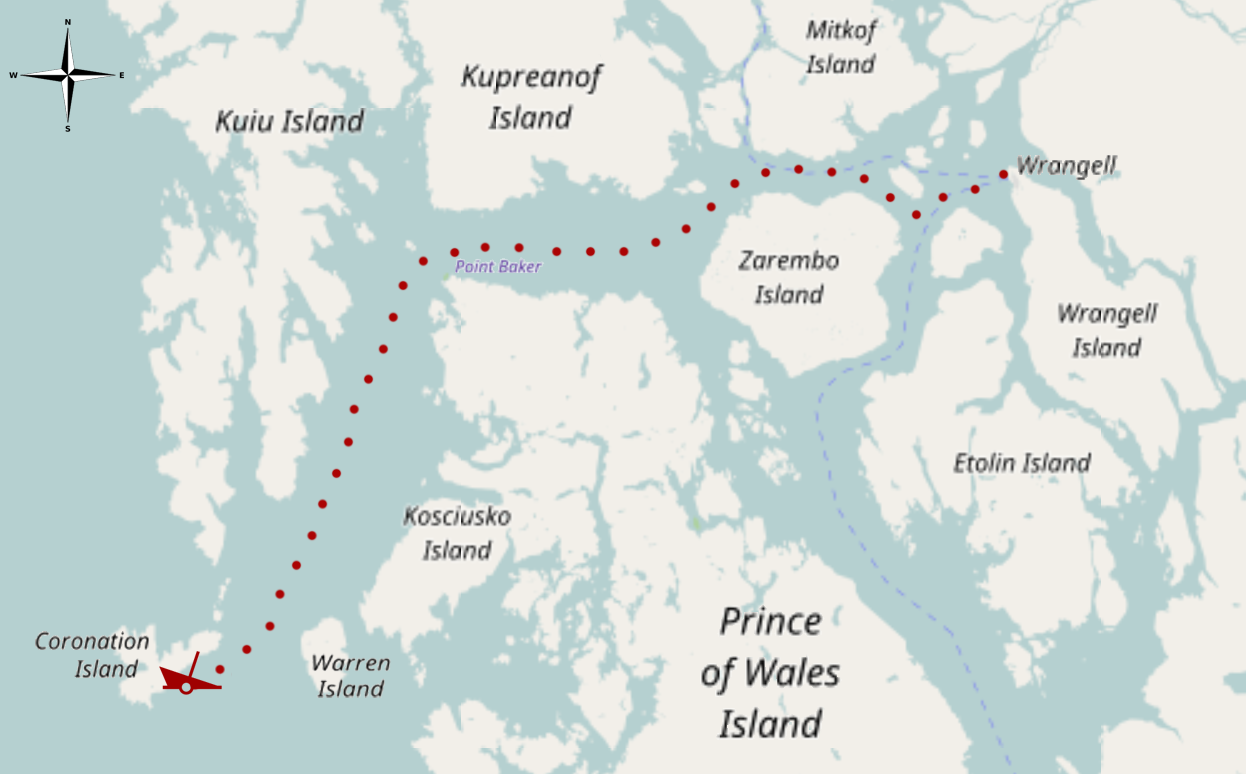
The Star of Bengal's final voyage (Note: Based on the map drawn by Ronald R. Burke.)

In 1908, the Star of Bengal sailed from San Francisco on April 22, arriving at Fort Wrangell on May 5. She was loaded with supplies for Wrangell cannery, including fuel for the season, and had 146 people on board, 110 of which were Asian. Because maneuvering a sailing vessel through a maze of small islands and narrow straits is too risky, the last 90 miles (140 km) of the voyage, from Warren Island to Fort Wrangell, the Star of Bengal was tugged by the 172 GT 250-hp Chilkat, an Alaska Packers' Association steamboat. That summer, the Wrangell cannery yielded 52,000 cases of salmon which were loaded on the ship while she was moored next to the cannery for the season.

=== The events of September 20, 1908 ===
==== Loss of control ====
The return trip began on September 19 with 137 or 138 people on board. (Note: The exact number of people aboard the Star of Bengal remains unknown, because there was no passenger manifest of Asian passengers. Sources agree that there were 32 Caucasian crew and passengers on board, 37 Japanese and Filipino cannery workers, and approximately 69 Chinese cannery workers, the latter ambiguity resulting in the discrepancy in the totals. As the result of the confusion, crew testimony and some media reports put the number of passengers at 138, while the US official maritime record and other media reports put the figure at 137. Further complication arises from one historical and often-recited account of the incident that records 132 people on board. The error apparently stems from Captain Wagner's published statement: "In exactly fifty-four minutes from the time the ship struck the ledge she went to pieces and sent 132 people into the icy waters..." which in fact discounts the four volunteers who had already reached Coronation Island in the lifeboat and the person who was killed trying to use the breeches buoy.) This time, the tug Chilkat was unavailable to take the Star of Bengal into the open sea, so on company orders, she was towed by two smaller steamboats – the 80 GT 90-hp Hattie Gage and the 115 GT 225-hp Kayak, neither of which were designed for vessel towing or large enough to perform the operation individually. The Kayak's draft was too shallow, so when towing a vessel she risked propeller and rudder being submerged too shallowly for effective operation, especially in rough weather. The Hattie Gage's aft was not equipped with proper bitts, so 6-inch-thick (15 cm) and 750-foot-long (230 m) hawser had to be tied directly to her mast. Both tugs were owned by the Alaska Packers' Association.

The Hattie Gage was under command of Captain Erwin Ferrar, (Note: At the time, many media reports spelled the captain's last name as Ferrer and his first name as Dan. However, in later official documents and historical accounts, his name was recorded as Erwin Ferrar.) who had 35 years of experience at sea, including 13 seasons in Alaska. The Kayak was captained by Captain Patrick Hamilton, who had recently obtained his captain's license after 10 years of experience at sea as mate and boatswain. Together with Captain Wagner of the Star of Bengal, they decided to proceed with the tow, as the weather was calm. Captain Ferrar was placed in charge of the operation. The small flotilla left Fort Wrangell at 8:20 a.m., making about 5 miles per hour (8.0 km/h) and planning to reach the open sea at Warren Island in 12 to 18 hours. The vessels passed point Baker at 3:50 p.m., and reached the 5.8-mile-wide (9.3 km) strait between Coronation Island and Warren Island at 10:00 p.m. By that time, the wind has strengthened, and the visibility was poor due to rain, mist, and darkness. The lookouts on both tugs could no longer see the Star of Bengal, which was 250 yards (230 m) behind them.

By midnight, the flotilla was on its final leg between Warren and Coronation islands, and the captains of both tugboats became concerned with the freshening southeast headwind. The vessels were making very little forward progress, and getting closer to Coronation Island than expected. With the poor visibility, the crews of all three ships relied on lead lines to ascertain their positions with respect to land. As the wind continued to strengthen, by 1:00 a.m. Captains Farrar and Hamilton, whose tugboats were moving 100 feet (30 m) from each other, negotiated a turn to jibe the Star of Bengal, i.e., to pull her through the wind and change her tack from port to starboard.

The Star of Bengal's crew also became concerned, but could neither see nor communicate with the tugboats. At 1:45 a.m., the Hattie Gage blew a series of whistles signaling the maneuver, which were heard on the Star of Bengal. However, as the tugs started the turn, the Kayak's rudder proved ineffective in the rough weather, and she failed to turn into the wind. For some time, the tugs worked against each other, their combined effort overpowering the Star of Bengal's rudder and preventing her from making the turn to safety. Aware of the looming danger, Star of Bengal first mate begged Captain Wagner to sever the Kayak's hawser, which was dragging the ship in the wrong direction, but the captain refused, as maritime law prohibited such action on the part of the vessel in tow.

At one point, the tugs succeeded turning the Star of Bengal to a starboard tack, but she immediately reverted to port tack. Whether due to a sudden change in direction of the wind or to an error on part of the Star of Bengal's crew, her sails were filled aback. This resulted in a more dangerous situation, pushing all three vessels towards the rocky shore of Coronation island. The two tugs continued to struggle to pull the Star of Bengal out of danger, but the ships continued to drift leeward. Both tugs started to experience mechanical problems with their boilers due to overloading, and the Hattie Gage developed structural problems with her mast mounting. At 3:50 a.m. the Star of Bengal dropped her anchors in 17 fathoms (102 ft; 31 m) of water. Pulled into less than 10 fathoms (60 ft; 18 m) of water and occasionally as close as 100 feet (30 m) to the land, the tugs finally severed their hawsers at 4:00 a.m., steamed out of danger, and found shelter from the still-strengthening winds 12 miles (19 km) away, behind Warren Island.

==== Sinking ====
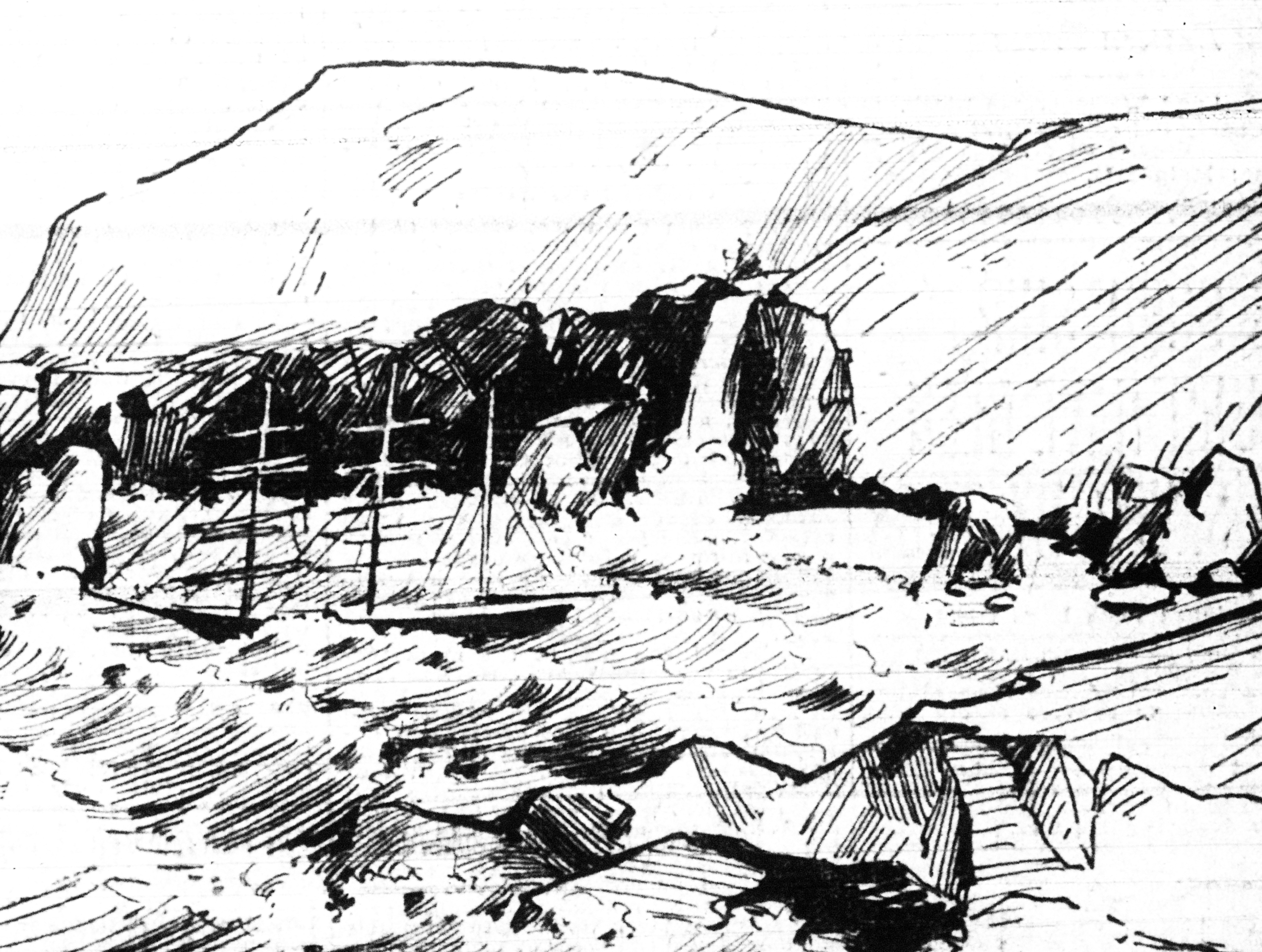
The ship anchored in danger

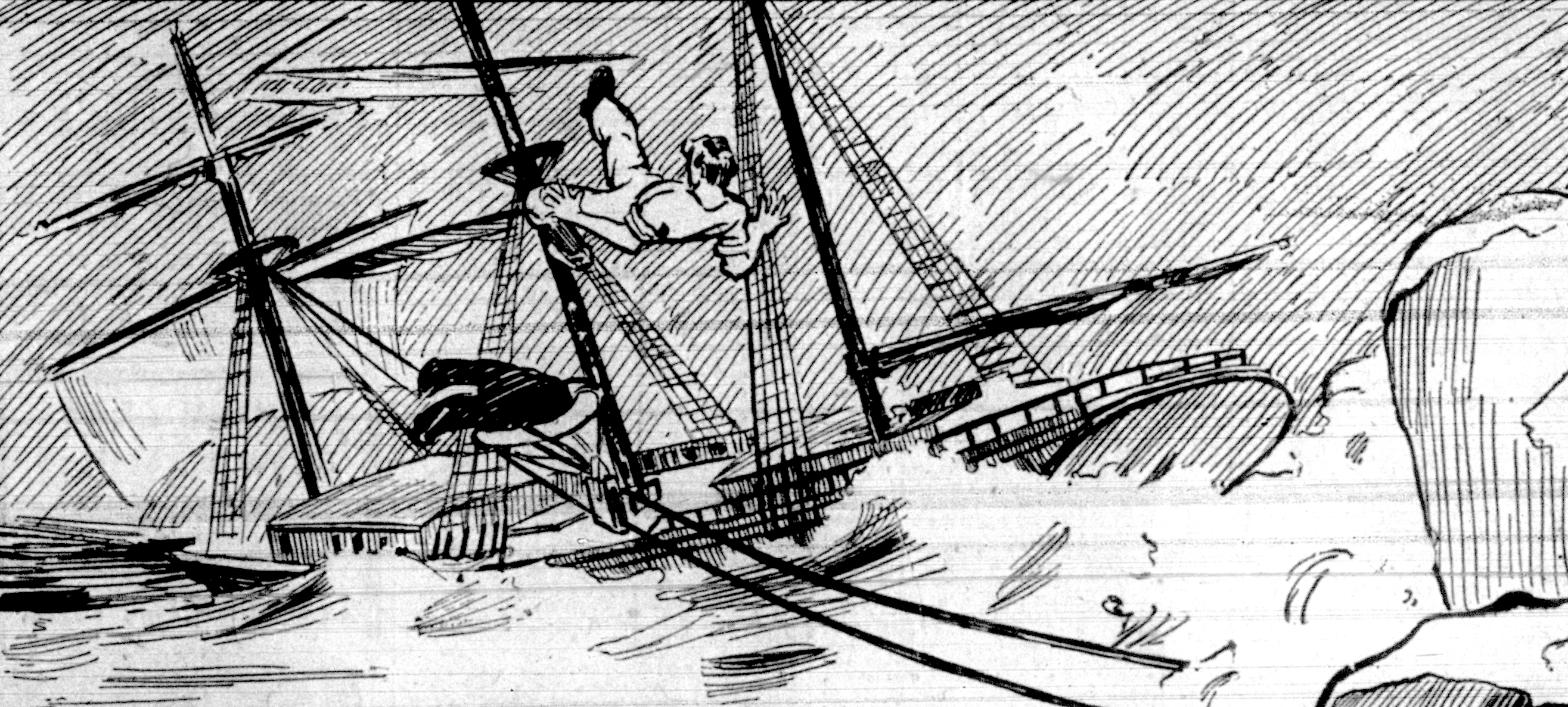
The breeches buoy debacle

Artistic representations based on eyewitness accounts (by Seattle Post-Intelligencer)

With the dawn, the Star of Bengal's crew realized how dangerous the ship's position was: just 100 yards (91 m) from the rocky beach of Coronation Island, barely held by her anchors amidst the storm. By 7:00 a.m., the wind turned into a gale, reaching 60 miles per hour (97 km/h). With no tugs in sight, the crew started preparing for the worst. All men aboard received life-preservers; however, most of the Chinese passengers did not put them on. Captain Wagner called for volunteers who would attempt to reach the shore in a lifeboat to secure a line on shore in order to evacuate passengers with a breeches buoy. The crew dumped oil into the sea to calm the waves, but the first attempt to lower a lifeboat failed, as it immediately smashed into pieces.

The second attempt to lower the boat was successful, and manned by four volunteers, the boat reached the shore and broke into pieces on the impact with the rocky beach. All four men survived the crash, and by 9:00 a.m. they managed to secure a rope from the Star of Bengal to a tree. The donkey boiler was used to keep the rope strained. However, as another volunteer was climbing along the rope with the breeches buoy, the ship's anchors finally gave in to the storm. The rope became unstable and unsuitable for evacuation, and the volunteer was catapulted 60 feet (18 m) into the air and killed as he landed on the ship's deck. At 9:32 a.m., the ship struck the rocks. During the next 54 minutes, the ship's hull broke in three pieces, and she sank at 55°49′30″N 134°17′0″W with just her mizzen topmast visible above water.

Passengers and crew found themselves in 40 °F (4 °C) water surrounded by wooden cases of canned salmon and empty steel fuel drums from the ship's hold. Frenzied by the storm, the debris was almost impossible to swim through. Depending on the exact number of passengers aboard the Star of Bengal, 110 or 111 people died in the wreck, and 27 people survived. The beach was soon covered by dead bodies, many mutilated by the ship's cargo, and many drowned in the powerful undertow. The 27 survivors included the four volunteers and Captain Wagner, who was pulled unconscious from the water by crew members.

The survivors used the leftovers of fuel to make fire and stay warm. They made an extensive search for survivors, buried white corpses, and left Asian corpses behind, covered by ship's sails. The survivors were picked up by the Kayak the next day. The US government cable ship Burnside arrived at the scene of the wreck later, and her crew buried the remaining corpses in a mass grave. (Note: Although inconsequential to the outcome, the actions of the US government cable ship Burnside were criticized, because upon hearing of the Star of Bengal's predicament from the Hattie Gage, the Burnside's captain chose to wait for permission to assist from Washington, D.C., rather than to proceed to Coronation Island immediately.) With the high number of casualties, as of 2015, the wreck is among the top five worst marine disasters in the history of Alaska.

Passengers, casualties, and survivors
Group	By ethnicity	Total aboard	Survived	Died	Survival rate	Sources and notes
Crew	Caucasian	21	15	6	71%	The table is based on the official record published in the Seattle Times and Alaskan newspapers, and may be off plus or minus one person.; Crew members are separated from cannery workers according to the official report and the published passenger lists.
Passengers	Caucasian	11	2	9	18%	The table is based on the official record published in the Seattle Times and Alaskan newspapers, and may be off plus or minus one person.; Crew members are separated from cannery workers according to the official report and the published passenger lists.
Passengers	Chinese	69	2	67	3%	The table is based on the official record published in the Seattle Times and Alaskan newspapers, and may be off plus or minus one person.; Crew members are separated from cannery workers according to the official report and the published passenger lists.
Passengers	Japanese	33	7	26	21%	The table is based on the official record published in the Seattle Times and Alaskan newspapers, and may be off plus or minus one person.; Crew members are separated from cannery workers according to the official report and the published passenger lists.
Passengers	Filipino	4	1	3	25%	The table is based on the official record published in the Seattle Times and Alaskan newspapers, and may be off plus or minus one person.; Crew members are separated from cannery workers according to the official report and the published passenger lists.
Total		138	27	111	20%	The table is based on the official record published in the Seattle Times and Alaskan newspapers, and may be off plus or minus one person.; Crew members are separated from cannery workers according to the official report and the published passenger lists.

=== Investigation ===
As soon as the survivors reached shore, Captain Wagner publicly accused the tugboat captains of "criminal cowardice." He alleged that they abandoned the Star of Bengal in a dangerous situation and ignored her distress lights, thus missing the window of opportunity before the storm intensified at 8:00 a.m. when passengers could have been taken from the Star of Bengal aboard the tugboats. Captain Ferrar denied the existence of such a window, as had there been a period of calm sea, Captain Wagner could have evacuated his men ashore. The case came under federal investigation, and two inspectors started hearings in San Francisco on October 3, 1908.

The hearing was initially aimed at assessing the responsibility of the Star of Bengal's crew. Captain Wagner and his first mate, Victor Johansen, were interrogated by the inspectors; both repeated the accusation against the captains of the tugs. During the hearing, the Alaska Packers' Association provided written testimonies of nautical experts that supported the position of the tugs' captains. On October 7, Captain Wagner and the first mate filed formal charges of cowardice against the tug captains.

Captains Farrar and Hamilton provided their written testimonies, insisting that their actions were justified, as after the Star of Bengal dropped her anchors they were powerless to assist the large ship and responsible to ensure safety of their own vessels and crews. After completing repairs, the Hattie Gage steamed to Fort Wrangell to seek assistance of a larger ship, the Burnside, while the Kayak went searching for the Star of Bengal, eventually locating the survivors. The tugs' crews were summoned to San Francisco to testify on October 23; both crews supported their captains' testimonies. The hearing of witnesses ended on October 27, and the inspectors published their findings on January 27, 1909. They exonerated the tugboat captains, stating that there was not sufficient evidence of criminal cowardice. Moreover, on April 15, the inspectors revoked Captain Wagner's license, holding him responsible for the loss of life. Captain Wagner immediately appealed the decision and it was promptly reversed by the supervising inspector as "unsubstantiated."

=== Aftermath ===
The wreck of the Star of Bengal was described as "one of the worst disasters" of the Pacific coast maritime history. Due to the high number of casualties, as of 2015, the wreck of the Star of Bengal remains in the top 5 worst marine disasters in the history of Alaska. Both, the ship and her cargo were declared a total loss. The cost of the cargo was estimated at $227,000 ($6,000,000), bringing the total value of hull and cargo to $330,000 ($8,800,000): the largest maritime loss in Alaska waters at the time. The ship and her cargo was insured by Lloyd's, which limited the losses of the Alaska Packers' Association. The APA made volunteer donations to the families of the lost of more than $16,000 ($425,000) in total, which was considered generous at the time.

After his license was restored, Captain Wagner continued to command other sailing vessels. Captains Farrar and Hamilton were tried by the court of public opinion, and as of 2001, their role in the wreck remains uncertain. In 2008, a centennial commemoration of the wreck was organized in the Wrangell Museum.

=== Wreckage ===
In later years, numerous attempts have been made by divers to locate the wreckage of the Star of Bengal, but as of 2022, they were unsuccessful. On 6 May 2022, an eight-person team embarked on the research vessel Endeavor to find and authenticate the wreckage, as well as to retrieve artifacts. The expedition consisted of both divers and cultural experts, who sought to document the cultural and social significance of the shipwreck.

== In fiction ==
=== The Cradle of the Deep ===
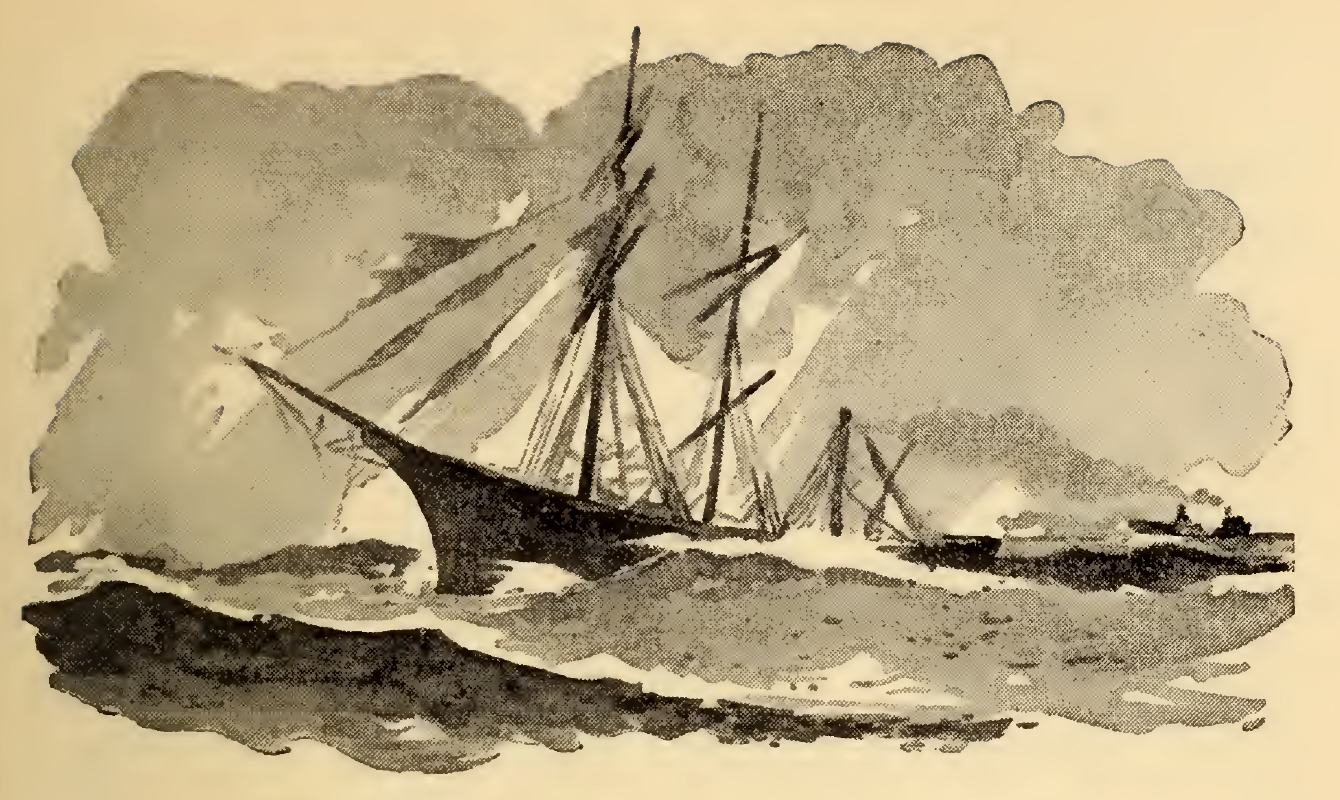
Kurt Wiese's illustration of the wrecked Star of Bengal published in The Cradle of the Deep

In March 1929, Captain Wagner's daughter, Joan Lowell, published a book titled The Cradle of the Deep purported to be her autobiography. In the book, Lowell spends the first 17 years of her life aboard her father's schooner, the Minnie A. Caine, barefoot and surrounded by the all-male crew. Initially, The Cradle of the Deep received multiple positive reviews from different sources, including The Washington Post, Time, Life, and the Los Angeles Times.

The book soon became a bestseller, topping the non-fiction category of The New York Times Best Seller list. Even though it was quickly exposed as a hoax, the subsequent literary scandal and the media frenzy propelled The Cradle of the Deep into its fiction category, and The Cradle of the Deep finished 1929 as the third best-selling book of the year.

In chapter 11 of The Cradle of the Deep, Lowell gives her account of the Star of Bengal's wreck, which is loosely based on the stories she heard from her father. In the book, ominous signs foreshadow the wreck, and the full responsibility of the disaster is placed on the shoulders of the tugboat captains, who mishandle their drunken and inexperienced crews, become "panic-stricken," and flee the scene. Furthermore, the tug captains commit other acts "beyond human comprehension," including burning the corpses of the Chinese passengers "like rubbish" on Coronation Island, and salvaging the food from the Star of Bengal's hold that was mixed with the dead men and selling the cooked mixture to Eskimos.

Inspired by the scandal, humorist Corey Ford published a parody on Lowell's book titled Salt Water Taffy; or, Twenty thousand leagues away from the sea; the almost incredible autobiography of Capt. Ezra Triplett's seafaring daughter, by June Triplett, which also became a bestseller. In his book, Ford exaggerates the most grotesque details of The Cradle of the Deep, thus demonstrating the fraudulent nature of the "autobiography." Chapter 6 of Salt Water Taffy, which mimics chapter 11 of The Cradle of the Deep, Ford ridicules Lowell's devotion to the maritime omens that allegedly preceded the Star of Bengal's last voyage and the portrayal of her father as an infallible captain.

=== Broadway play ===
In 1929, Joan Lowell's husband, Thompson Buchanan, wrote a play titled Star of Bengal, which is set on the ship. The play was produced by Christopher Morley and opened in late September, starring Charles Starrett, Joan Lowell, and William P. Carleton. This "consciously superannuated" melodrama features a love affair between the captain's daughter (Lowell) and a sailor (Starrett) that leads to their elopement. The runaways are caught, and the captain (Carleton) is about to hang the sailor; however, upon learning that his daughter is pregnant, the captain turns magnanimous. The play lasted only until November and was generally regarded as unsuccessful. Its failure was rumored to be a contributing factor in Buchanan's and Lowell's subsequent divorce.

== See also ==
- Lists of shipwrecks

== Literature cited ==
- "CPI Inflation Calculator", Bureau of Labor Statistics, Washington: United States Department of Labor
- Lloyd's register of shipping (PDF), vol. 1, London: Lloyd's Register of British and Foreign Shipping, 1874, LCCN ca08001387, OCLC 16874263
- Lloyd's register of shipping, vol. 1, London: Lloyd's Register of British and Foreign Shipping, 1885, LCCN ca08001387, OCLC 16874263
- Lloyd's register of shipping, vol. 1, London: Lloyd's Register of British and Foreign Shipping, 1886, LCCN ca08001387, OCLC 16874263
- Lloyd's register of shipping, vol. 1, London: Lloyd's Register of British and Foreign Shipping, 1887, LCCN ca08001387, OCLC 16874263
- Lloyd's register of shipping, vol. 1, London: Lloyd's Register of British and Foreign Shipping, 1888, LCCN ca08001387, OCLC 16874263
- "Police Court–Port Adelaide", Express and Telegraph, vol. 7326, no. XXV, Adelaide: Fred Burden & John Langdon Bonython, p. 4, May 16, 1888, LCCN sn88088315, OCLC 18594590
- Lloyd's register of shipping, vol. 1, London: Lloyd's Register of British and Foreign Shipping, 1889, LCCN ca08001387, OCLC 16874263
- "The Star of Victoria", The Sydney Mail and New South Wales Advertiser, vol. XLIX, no. 1539, Sydney: John Fairfax and Sons, p. 46, January 4, 1890, LCCN sn85054162, OCLC 11620994
- Syme, David, ed. (January 28, 1891), "Imports–January 27", The Age, no. 11209, Melbourne: F. Cooke, p. 4, ISSN 0312-6307, LCCN sn90023149, OCLC 9839209
- Lloyd's register of shipping (PDF), vol. 2, London: Lloyd's Register of British and Foreign Shipping, 1893, LCCN ca08001387, OCLC 16874263
- Lloyd's register of shipping (PDF), vol. 2, London: Lloyd's Register of British and Foreign Shipping, 1896, LCCN ca08001387, OCLC 16874263
- Lloyd's register of shipping (PDF), vol. 2, London: Lloyd's Register of British and Foreign Shipping, 1899, LCCN ca08001387, OCLC 16874263
- "Ships and Cargoes Afire", San Francisco Chronicle, vol. LXIX, no. 69, San Francisco: Chales D. Young & Co., p. 3, March 25, 1899, ISSN 1932-8672, LCCN sn82003402, OCLC 8812614
- Lloyd's register of shipping, vol. 1, London: Lloyd's Register of British and Foreign Shipping, 1903, LCCN ca08001387, OCLC 16874263
- Lloyd's register of shipping, vol. 1, London: Lloyd's Register of British and Foreign Shipping, 1907, LCCN ca08001387, OCLC 16874263
- "Annual list of merchant vessels of the United States", Merchant Vessels of the United States, 40, Washington: Government Printing Office, 1908, ISSN 0076-650X, LCCN 76606560, OCLC 9336739
- "Hundred Ten Drown in Wreck of Ship", Los Angeles Times, vol. 27, Los Angeles, p. 1, September 23, 1908, ISSN 0458-3035, LCCN sn81004356, OCLC 3638237
- "Bark Star of Bengal Wrecked in Alaska and 110 Lose Lives", San Francisco Chronicle, vol. XCIII, no. 70, San Francisco: Chales D. Young & Co., pp. 1–2, September 23, 1908, ISSN 1932-8672, LCCN sn82003402, OCLC 8812614
- Blethen, Alden J., ed. (September 23, 1908), "110 Dead in Wreck of Bengal", Seattle Times, Seattle: Frank A. Blethen, p. 4, ISSN 0745-9696, LCCN sn83009191, OCLC 9198928
- "Appalling Scenes Are Enacted At Wreck of the Cannery Bark Star of Bengal", Seattle Post-Intelligencer, vol. LIV, no. 132, Seattle: Leigh S. J. Hunt, pp. 1–2, September 24, 1908, ISSN 2379-7304, LCCN sn83045604, OCLC 9563195
- "Captains of Tugs to Be Prosecuted", San Francisco Call, vol. CIV, no. 116, San Francisco: Charles M. Shortridge, p. 3, September 24, 1908, ISSN 1941-0719, LCCN sn85066387, OCLC 13146227
- Blethen, Alden J., ed. (September 24, 1908), "Scenes of Horror Marked Wreck", Seattle Times, Seattle: Frank A. Blethen, p. 5, ISSN 0745-9696, LCCN sn83009191, OCLC 9198928
- "Capt. Wagner of Ill-fated Star of Bengal Tells Tale of Cruel and Inhuman Treatment", Seattle Post-Intelligencer, vol. LIV, no. 135, Seattle: Leigh S. J. Hunt, pp. 1–2, September 27, 1908, ISSN 2379-7304, LCCN sn83045604, OCLC 9563195
- Blethen, Alden J., ed. (September 27, 1908), "Ship-Wrecked Men Reach Seattle", Seattle Times, Seattle: Frank A. Blethen, pp. 1, 8, ISSN 0745-9696, LCCN sn83009191, OCLC 9198928
- "Tug Captains Cut Tow Lines and Abandoned the Star of Bengal", San Francisco Chronicle, vol. XCIII, no. 80, San Francisco: Chales D. Young & Co., pp. 1–2, October 3, 1908, ISSN 1932-8672, LCCN sn82003402, OCLC 8812614
- "Cowardice Is Charged", Los Angeles Times, vol. 27, Los Angeles, p. 3, October 4, 1908, ISSN 0458-3035, LCCN sn81004356, OCLC 3638237
- "Tugs Could Not Help the Bengal", San Francisco Chronicle, vol. XCIII, no. 81, San Francisco: Chales D. Young & Co., p. 36, October 4, 1908, ISSN 1932-8672, LCCN sn82003402, OCLC 8812614
- "Tug Masters Face Trial for Wreck", San Francisco Call, vol. CIV, no. 129, San Francisco: Charles M. Shortridge, p. 16, October 7, 1908, ISSN 1941-0719, LCCN sn85066387, OCLC 13146227
- "Tug Captain Tells Cause of Bengal's Wreck", Seattle Star, vol. 10, no. 195, Seattle: E. W. Scripps, p. 1, October 8, 1908, ISSN 2159-5577, LCCN sn87093407, OCLC 17285351
- "Tug Captains Admit They Abandoned Ship", San Francisco Chronicle, vol. XCIII, no. 91, San Francisco: Chales D. Young & Co., p. 7, October 14, 1908, ISSN 1932-8672, LCCN sn82003402, OCLC 8812614
- Blethen, Alden J., ed. (October 15, 1908), "Farrar Answers Charge of Wagner", Seattle Times, Seattle: Frank A. Blethen, p. 4, ISSN 0745-9696, LCCN sn83009191, OCLC 9198928
- "Criminal Red Tape", Seattle Star, vol. 10, no. 203, Seattle: E. W. Scripps, p. 4, October 17, 1908, ISSN 2159-5577, LCCN sn87093407, OCLC 17285351
- "Ship Deserted in Angry Surf", San Francisco Chronicle, vol. XCIII, no. 100, San Francisco: Chales D. Young & Co., p. 5, October 23, 1908, ISSN 1932-8672, LCCN sn82003402, OCLC 8812614
- "Skipper Ireson in Arctic Waters", San Francisco Chronicle, vol. XCIII, no. 104, San Francisco: Chales D. Young & Co., p. 4, October 27, 1908, ISSN 1932-8672, LCCN sn82003402, OCLC 8812614
- "Annual list of merchant vessels of the United States", Merchant Vessels of the United States, 44, Washington: Government Printing Office, 1909, ISSN 0076-650X, LCCN 76606560, OCLC 9336739
- "Tug Captains Are Exonerated of Charges", San Francisco Chronicle, vol. XCIV, no. 12, San Francisco: Chales D. Young & Co., p. 2, January 27, 1909, ISSN 1932-8672, LCCN sn82003402, OCLC 8812614
- "License Revoked Pending Appeal", San Francisco Chronicle, vol. XCIV, no. 90, San Francisco: Chales D. Young & Co., p. 8, April 15, 1909, ISSN 1932-8672, LCCN sn82003402, OCLC 8812614
- "License Revoked Pending Appeal", San Francisco Chronicle, vol. XCIV, no. 96, San Francisco: Chales D. Young & Co., p. 18, April 21, 1909, ISSN 1932-8672, LCCN sn82003402, OCLC 8812614
- Lloyd's register of shipping, vol. 1, London: Lloyd's Register of British and Foreign Shipping, 1911, LCCN ca08001387, OCLC 16874263
- "Sailor Girl Writes Memoirs, Following 17 Years at Sea", Washington Post, Washington: Washington Post Co., pp. М6, March 17, 1929, ISSN 2641-0702, LCCN sn82014727, OCLC 8787120
- Luce, Henry R.; Martin, John S., eds. (March 18, 1929), "Skipper's Daughter", Time, vol. XIII, no. 11, New York: Time Inc., p. 52, ISSN 0040-781X, LCCN 25011669, OCLC 1767509
- "New York's Best Sellers", Los Angeles Times, vol. XLVIII, Los Angeles, p. 20, April 14, 1929, ISSN 0458-3035, LCCN sn81004356, OCLC 3638237
- Luce, Henry R.; Martin, John S., eds. (April 15, 1929), "Cradle Rocked", Time, vol. XIII, no. 15, New York: Time Inc., p. 38, ISSN 0040-781X, LCCN 25011669, OCLC 1767509
- "Plays and Players", Brooklyn Daily Eagle, vol. 89, no. 266, Brooklyn: I. Van Anden, p. 23, September 25, 1929, ISSN 2577-9397, LCCN sn83031151, OCLC 9817881
- "In New York", Chicago Sunday Tribune, vol. LXXXVIII, no. 39, Chicago: Tribune Company, pp. 5–7, September 29, 1929, ISSN 1085-6706, LCCN sn84031492, OCLC 1554151
- "Deep Sea Joan Lowell's Love Raft Wrecked", Chicago Sunday Tribune, vol. LXXXVIII, no. 45, Chicago: Tribune Company, p. 25, November 10, 1929, ISSN 1085-6706, LCCN sn84031492, OCLC 1554151
- Andrews, C. L. (January 1, 1916), Meany, Edmond S. (ed.), "Marine Disasters of the Alaska Route", The Washington Historical Quarterly, 7 (1), Seattle: University of Washington: 21–37, ISSN 0361-6223, JSTOR 40428352, LCCN 2001206631, OCLC 2104676
- Bordman, Gerald Martin (1995), American theatre: a chronicle of comedy and drama, 1914–1930, New York: Oxford University Press, ISBN 0195090780, LCCN 94013842, OCLC 30356203
- Boyd, Ellsworth (March 1, 2005), "The Elusive Star of Bengal", Sport Diver, vol. 13, no. 2, Winter Park: World Publications, p. 14, ISSN 1077-985X, LCCN sn94000644, OCLC 30948684
- Clark, Henry W. (1930), History of Alaska (1st ed.), New York: Macmillan Company, LCCN 30009232, OCLC 480062
- Colby, Anne (March 14, 2008), "Meet the grandmother of memoir fabricators: Discredited author Margaret Seltzer could learn from her spunky literary predecessor", Los Angeles Times, Los Angeles, pp. E20, ISSN 0458-3035, LCCN sn81004356, OCLC 3638237
- Dickie, Alexander J. (March 10, 1916), Dickie, F. M. (ed.), "The Story of Alaska", Pacific Marine Review, vol. 13, no. 3, San Francisco: James S. Hines, pp. 31–52, LCCN ca08001872, OCLC 2449383
- Donaghey, Frederick (October 6, 1929), "This and That Thing About the Theater", Chicago Sunday Tribune, vol. LXXXVIII, no. 40, Chicago: Tribune Company, pp. 1–7, ISSN 1085-6706, LCCN sn84031492, OCLC 1554151
- Fairburn, William Armstrong (1945), Ritchie, Ethel M. (ed.), Merchant sail, vol. 4, Center Lovell: Fairburn Marine Educational Foundation, LCCN 57002887, OCLC 1452649
- Ford, Corey (1929a), Salt water taffy, or, Twenty thousand leagues away from the sea: the almost incredible autobiography of Capt. Ezra Triplett's seafaring daughter, New York: G. P. Putnam's Sons, LCCN 29012707, OCLC 1705293
- Ford, Thomas F. (March 24, 1929b), "Sailor Girl's Tale Spun: Joan Lowell, Lass Who Sailed Before Mast, Relates Life Story in Lively Book", Los Angeles Times, Los Angeles, pp. С11, ISSN 0458-3035, LCCN sn81004356, OCLC 3638237
- Gibbs, Jim (1969), Pacific square-riggers: pictorial history of the great windships of yesteryear (1st ed.), Seattle: Superior Publishing Company, LCCN 70087804, OCLC 53233
- Gibbs, Jim (1997), Alaskan maritime, Schiffer history book, Atglen: Schiffer Publishing, ISBN 0764300350, LCCN 97080089, OCLC 38294528
- Githens, Perry (March 22, 1929), Thompson, Edward Kramer (ed.), "The New Books", Life, vol. 93, no. 2420, Chicago: Time Inc., p. 28, ISSN 0024-3019, LCCN sf89099014, OCLC 5391019
- Good, Warren (2015), Alaska shipwrecks: 1750–2010, Palm Coast: Warren Good, OCLC 905614748
- Hanford, Cornelius (1924), Seattle and Environs 1852-1924, vol. 1, Chicago: Pioneer Historical Publishing Company, OCLC 3494902
- Harrington, Louise Brinck (June 1, 1996), "The Wreck of the Star of Bengal", Alaskan Southeaster Magazine, vol. 6, no. 6, Douglas: McPhee Publications, OCLC 31110280
- Hitchman, James H. (1990), A maritime history of the Pacific Coast, 1540–1980, Lanham: University Press of America, ISBN 0819178160, LCCN 90034399, OCLC 21332097
- Hooper, R. B. (October 15, 1908), Jayne, H. B. (ed.), "Star of Bengal, Loss of – Allegations of Cowardice", Pacific Marine Review, vol. V, no. 10, San Francisco: James S. Hines, p. 28, LCCN ca08001872, OCLC 2449383
- Hylen, I. N. (1908b), "Vice-President Hylen's report", Proceedings of the 13th Annual Convention of the International Seamen's Union of America, no. 13, Boston: International Seamen's Union of America, pp. 54–56, LCCN ca12001258, OCLC 25480925
- Hylen, I. N. (October 14, 1908a), "Alaska Fisherman's Union" (PDF), Coast Seamen's Journal, vol. XXII, no. 4, San Francisco: International Seamen's Union, p. 7, LCCN sv93014379, OCLC 7958943
- Lloyd, Steve K. (September 1, 2001a), "The Wreck of the Bark Star of Bengal, Part I of II", The Sea Chest: Journal of the Puget Sound Maritime Historical Society, vol. 35, no. 1, Seattle: Puget Sound Maritime Historical Society, pp. 17–26, ISSN 0582-3471, LCCN sn79009771, OCLC 2955748
- Lloyd, Steve K. (December 1, 2001b), "The Wreck of the Bark Star of Bengal, Part II, concluded", The Sea Chest: Journal of the Puget Sound Maritime Historical Society, vol. 35, no. 2, Seattle: Puget Sound Maritime Historical Society, pp. 77–85, ISSN 0582-3471, LCCN sn79009771, OCLC 2955748
- Lowell, Joan (1929), The Cradle of the Deep, New York: Simon and Schuster, LCCN 29007122, OCLC 486498
- Loy, Wesley (December 3, 2008), "Star of Bengal disaster – 111 people died when tugs failed as ship was leaving Wrangell 100 years ago, Shipwreck Jolted Alaska Salmon Industry", Anchorage Daily News, Anchorage: The McClatchy Company, pp. A1, ISSN 0194-6870, LCCN sn84020659, OCLC 2685131
- Lubbock, Basil (1927), The last of the windjammers, vol. 1, Boston: Charles E. Lauriat Co., LCCN 27023850, OCLC 3668435
- Macarthur, Walter (1929), Last days of sail on the West coast, San Francisco harbor, San Francisco: James H. Barry Company, LCCN 29008778, OCLC 5276511
- McCurdy, Horace Winslow (1966), Newell, Gordon R.; Fisken, Keith G. (eds.), The H. W. McCurdy Marine History of the Pacific Northwest, vol. 1, Seattle: Superior Publishing Company, LCCN 66025424, OCLC 16690016
- Newell, Gordon R. (1955), SOS North Pacific: tales of shipwrecks off the Washington, British Columbia and Alaska coasts, Portland: Binfords & Mort, LCCN 55001339, OCLC 2756004
- Parker, John (1933), Who's who in the theatre: a biographical record of the contemporary stage (7th ed.), London: Issac Pitman & Sons, LCCN 12022402, OCLC 18995487
- Pollock, Arthur (October 3, 1929), "Star of Bengal", Brooklyn Daily Eagle, vol. 89, no. 274, Brooklyn: I. Van Anden, p. 25, ISSN 2577-9397, LCCN sn83031151, OCLC 9817881
- Rakich, Whitney Purvis (2012), Trujillo, Michael (ed.), Savage fakes: Misdirection, fraudulence, and autobiography in the 1920s, Albuquerque: The University of New Mexico, OCLC 869557272
- Royce, Patrick M. (1989), Sailing illustrated: the sailor's bible since 1956, Marina del Rey: Western Marine Enterprises, ISBN 0894716964, LCCN 90193659, OCLC 19744409
- Tebbel, John William (1978), A history of book publishing in the United States, vol. III, New York: R. R. Bowker Co., ISBN 0835204898, LCCN 71163903, OCLC 354115
- Thorstenson, Bob (2001), Sturgill, Richard (ed.), Sockeye and the age of sail: the Story of the Alaska Packers Association, Seattle: John Sabella & Associates, OCLC 166589056
- Williams, Ralph D. (October 1, 1908), "Pacific Coast Notes", Marine Review, vol. 38, no. 14, Cleveland: Penton Publishing Company, p. 28, LCCN 40007286, OCLC 7166494
