= Bay of Pillars =

Bay in the U.S. state of Alaska

Coordinates: 56.60139°N 134.25778°W

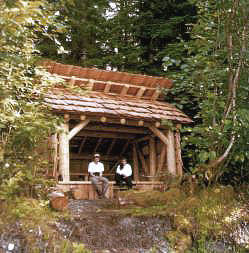
Bay of Pillars Shelter

Bay of Pillars is a bay located in the Alexander Archipelago in the southeastern region of the U.S. state of Alaska. It is situated within the Kuiu Wilderness of the Tongass National Forest.

== Geography ==
This bay is on the west side of Kuiu Island and opens on Chatham Strait, having Point Sullivan for the northern entrance point and Point Ellis marking the southern. It is a large body of water, much obstructed by islands and reefs, and has two deep arms similarly obstructed: North Bay of Pillars and South Bay of Pillars. On the southern shore of the South Bay of Pillars, about 4 miles (6.4 km) from Point Ellis, the cannery of the Astoria and Alaska Packing Company was located. The principal streams in this vicinity fished for commercial purposes are: Home Stream or Point Ellis Stream (the Indian name for it is Kutlakoo); Pillar Bay Stream; and Kuiu Stream (or Alecks Stream).

The North Bay of Pillars, like the South, is much obstructed by islets and reefs. The head of the bay, however, is clear, and is 1.25 miles (2.01 km) in length by 1 mile (1.6 km) in width. It forms a harbor with anchorage in moderate depths. At the extreme northern head of the bay are the mouths of two large streams, 0.75 miles (1.21 km) apart, bordered by extensive tidal flats.

The South Bay of Pillars is quite straight, and fairly clear for a distance of 5 miles (8.0 km), when the bay becomes choked with islands and reefs. In the southeastern angle, an arm extends to the eastward for about 1 mile (1.6 km), and receives the waters of a small humpback stream. On the northern side, the bay terminates in the Narrows (Skookum Chuck), which extend in a northeastern direction about .75 miles (1.21 km), with a width of about 300 feet (91 m), through which the current is quite violent during the strength of the tide. These Narrows connect with an inner bay 3 miles (4.8 km) long, in a northeast and southwest direction, by .75 miles (1.21 km) wide, which at the eastern end sends an arm at right angles to the southward about 1 mile (1.6 km) long by .25 miles (0.40 km) wide, receiving at the western terminus the waters of the Point Ellis or Kutlakoo stream. This stream is a lake outlet, and from the grassy flats at its mouth to the lake is about .75 miles (1.21 km) long, with an average width of 18 feet (5.5 m) and a depth of 10 inches. It has a general north-and-south direction, flowing over a gravelly bottom between moderately steep banks heavily wooded. As the lake is not more than 15–20 feet (4.6–6.1 m) above tide water, the current is not strong, nor are there any falls or strong rapids. Tide water extends about 150 feet (46 m) within the mouth.
