= Star Line (shipping company) =

Shipping line

House flag used by Star Line.

The Star Line was a fleet of ships owned by timber merchants, Messrs. James P Corry and Co Ltd. of Belfast, Ireland. The shipping company was formed by Robert Corry in 1826 to import timber from Canada to Ireland. The company began to diversify in 1859 when trade with Calcutta began and the company relocated its offices from Belfast to London. This was followed by services to Australia and New Zealand in 1888, South America in 1903 and a joint emigrant service to Australia with Royden and Tyser Lines started in 1912. The company became a constituent part of the Commonwealth & Dominion Line in 1914, which was renamed Port Line in 1937.

In 1908, it had a fleet of seven modern cargo steamers engaged in trade with the East and Far East, with a gross tonnage of 34,900 tons. The "Star Fleet" then consisted of the ships Star of Australia, Star of Japan, Star of England, Star of New Zealand, Star of Ireland, Star of Scotland and Star of Victoria.

Some of its sailing ships were sold to the Alaska Packers' Association.

== Fleet ==
=== Early timber sailing vessels ===
James P Corry and Co Ltd commenced its shipping business starting with one ship, Great Britain, and gradually established a large fleet including the following vessels – Chieftain (built 1826), Summerhill (built 1840), Queen of the West (built 1843), Alabama (built 1851), Persian (built 1851), Saint Helena (built 1851) and Charger (built 1856).

=== Star Line ===
==== Sailing ships ====
| Vessel | Built | Description/Fate | Photo |
|---|---|---|---|
| Jane Porter | 1860 | Three masted ship. She was sold in 1889 and was wrecked on the coast of Natal under the name of Trichera on 1 June 1905. | |
| Star of Erin | 1862 | Three masted ship. She was sold in 1889 and was wrecked on Waipapa Reef in the Foveaux Straits, New Zealand on 6 February 1892. | |
| Star of Denmark | 1863 | A 213-foot (65 m) ship of 998 tons. She was sold in 1889 and was wrecked under the name Denton Holme on 25 September 1890 on Rottnest Island in Western Australia. Further information: Rottnest Island shipwrecks | |
| Star of India | 1863 | She was sold in San Diego, California. | |
| Star of Scotia | 1864 | A 212-foot (65 m) ship of 999 tons. She was wrecked on Bull Point, Falkland Islands on 27 June 1887 with the loss of 7 crew. | |
| Star of Albion | 1864 | She was lost after grounding in the Hooghli Delta, India on 29 September 1886. | |
| Star of Persia | 1868 | She was sold in 1893 and was grounded and lost under the name Edith in the Solomon Islands in 1903. | |
| Star of Greece | 1868 | She run aground during a storm and broke up at Port Willunga in South Australia in July 1888 with a considerable loss of life. | |
| Star of Germany | 1872 | A 232-foot (70.7 m) ship of 1337 tons, was launched in 1872. She was sold in 1897 and was last reported during the 1920s as being a hulk under the name Grid in Trinidad. | Star of Germany |
| Star of Bengal | 1874 | A 262-foot (80 m) ship of 1870 tons. She was sold in 1898 to the Alaska Packers' Association and sunk with the loss of 110 lives at Coronation Island, Alaska on 20 September 1908. | Star of Bengal |
| Star of Russia | 1874 | A 262-foot (80 m) ship of 1981 tons. She was sold in 1898 to the Alaska Packers' Association and sunk possibly under the name La Perouse in Port Vila Harbour, Vanuatu during either 1953 or 1959. The wreck which is now known under the ship's original name is a well-known recreational dive site. | |
| Star of Italy | 1877 | A 257-foot (78 m) ship of 1644 tons. She was sold in 1898 to the Alaska Packers' Association and was last reported in 1935 as being a hulk moored in Buenaventura, Columbia. | Star of Italy |
| Star of France | 1877 | This was the last ship built by Harland and Wolff for James P Corry & Co. She was sold in 1899 to the Alaska Packers' Association and was sunk under the name of Olympic II off San Pedro, California on 4 September 1940 with the loss of 8 lives after being hit by a freighter during a dense fog. | Star of France |
| Star of Austria | 1886 | A 264-foot (80 m) ship of 1781 tons built by Workman, Clark & Co. She was lost without trace in the South Atlantic Ocean in 1895. | |

==== Steam ships ====
The company operated the following steam ships starting in January 1887 – Star of Victoria (built 1886), Star of England (built 1889), Star of New Zealand (built 1895), Star of Australia (built 1899), Star of Scotland (built 1904), Star of Japan (built 1906), Star of Ireland (built 1903), Star of Canada (built 1909) and Star of India (built 1910).

== Gallery ==
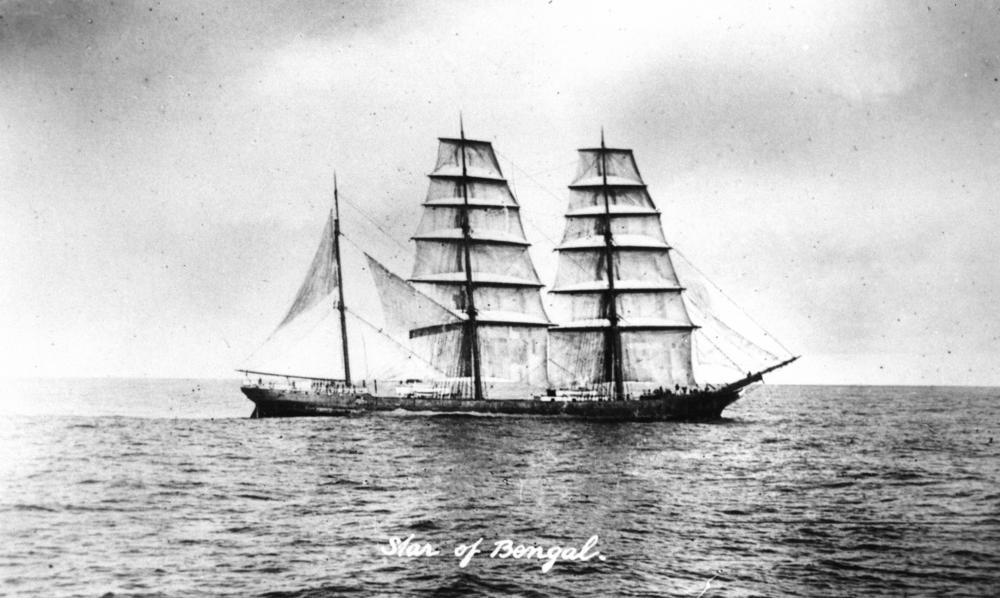
Star of Bengal.

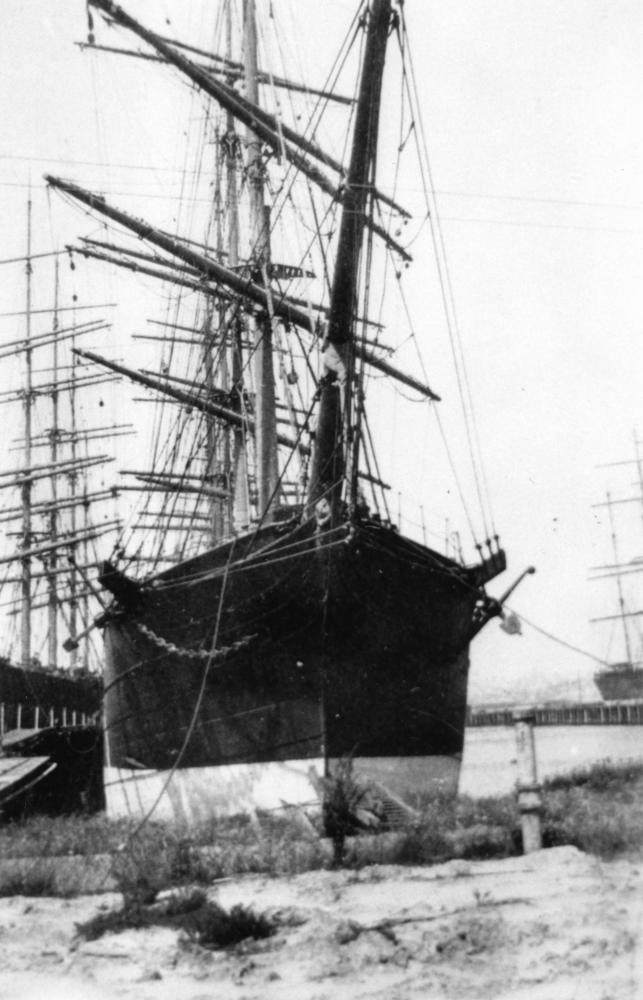
Star of France.

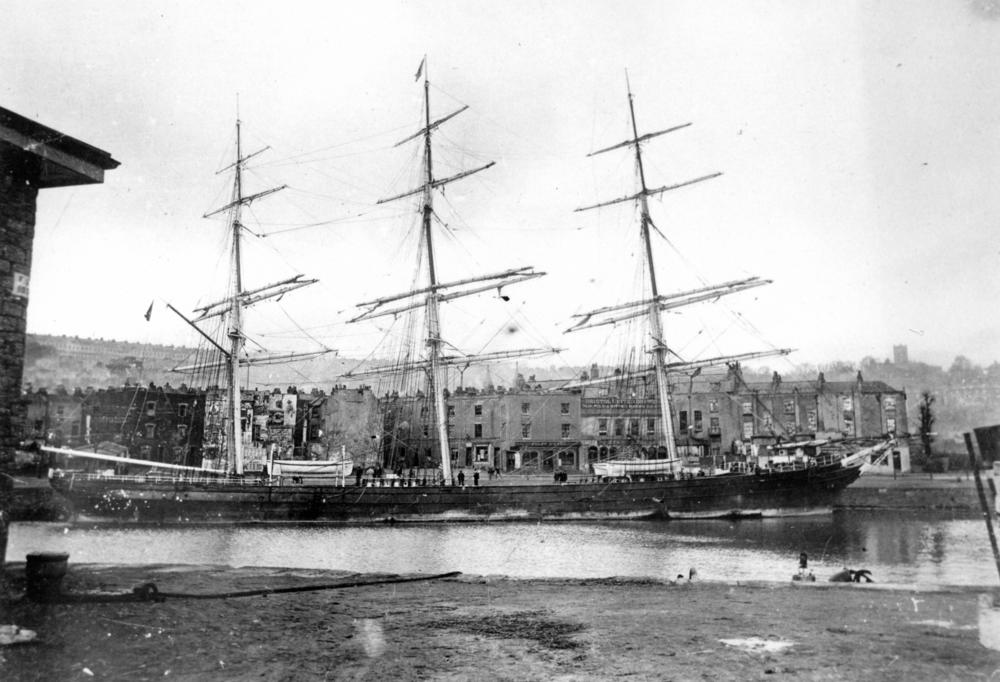
Star of Germany.

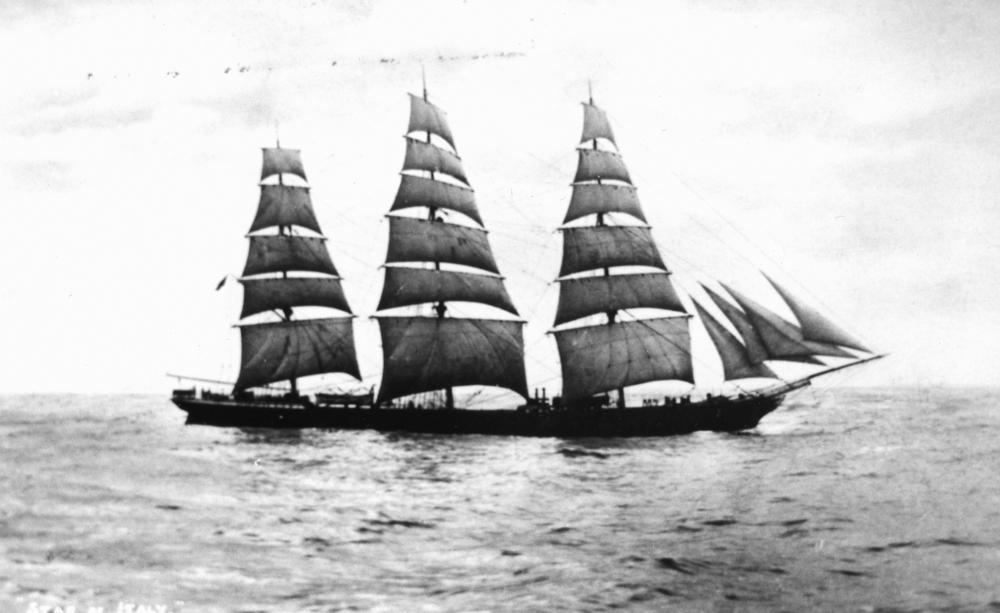
Star of Italy.
