= Barrer =

Non-SI unit of gas permeability

barrer
- Unit of: Permeability
- Symbol: barrer
- Named after: Richard Barrer

Conversions
1 barrer in ...	... is equal to ...
- SI: 3.35×10^{−16} s mol/kg

The barrer is a non-SI unit of permeability of gases used in the membrane technology and contact lens industry. It is named after the New Zealand-born chemist Richard Barrer.

== Definition ==
The barrer is defined as follows:

$$\rm {1} \ barrer = {10^{-10}} \frac{ cm^3_{STP} \cdot cm}{cm^2 \cdot s \cdot cmHg}$$

Confusingly, the centimetre notation is used in four different ways.

- To denote an amount of substance, the 'cm^{3}_{STP}' is standard cubic centimeter, which is a unit of amount of substance rather than a unit of volume. It represents the number of gas molecules or moles that would occupy one cubic centimeter at standard temperature and pressure, as calculated via the ideal gas law.
- To denote a pressure differential, the notation 'cmHg' is used - a 'centimetre of mercury' (rather than the more familiar 'millimetre of mercury').
- And finally, the centimetre and square centimetre are used in the normal way to measure thickness and area.

The cm corresponds in the permeability equations to the thickness of the material whose permeability is being evaluated, the cm^{3}_{STP}cm^{−2}s^{−1} to the flux of gas through the material, and the cmHg to the pressure drop across the material. That is, it measures the rate of fluid flow passing through an area of material with a thickness driven by a given pressure. See Darcy's Law.

In SI units, the barrer can be expressed as:

$$\rm {1} \ barrer = {3.35 \times 10^{-16}} \frac{ mol \cdot m}{m^2 \cdot s \cdot Pa}$$

To convert to CGS permeability unit, one must use the following:

$$\rm {1} \ barrer = {M \ \times} \ {3.35 \times 10^{-13}} \ \frac{ g \cdot cm}{s \cdot cm^2 \cdot bar}$$

Where M is the molecular weight of the penetrant gas (g/mol).

Another commonly expressed unit is Gas Permeance Unit (GPU). It is used in the measurement of gas permeance. Permeance can be expressed as the ratio of the permeability with the thickness of membrane.

$$\rm {1} \ GPU = 10^{-6} \ \frac{cm^3_{STP}}{cm^2 \cdot s \cdot cmHg}
=7.501\ \times \ 10^{-12} \ \frac{m^3_{STP}}{m^2 \cdot s \cdot Pa}$$

Or in SI units:

$$\rm {1} \ GPU = 3.35\ \times \ 10^{-10} \ \frac{mol}{m^2 \cdot s \cdot Pa}$$
