= Coronation Island (Alaska) =

Island in Petersburg Borough, Alaska, United States

Coordinates: 55°52′46″N 134°14′46″W

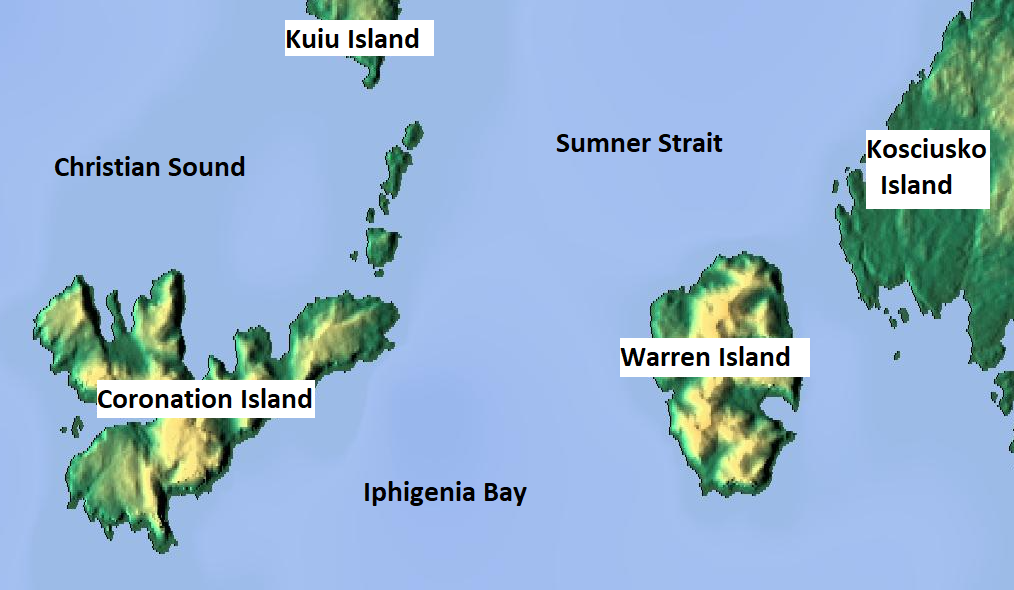
Location of Coronation Island

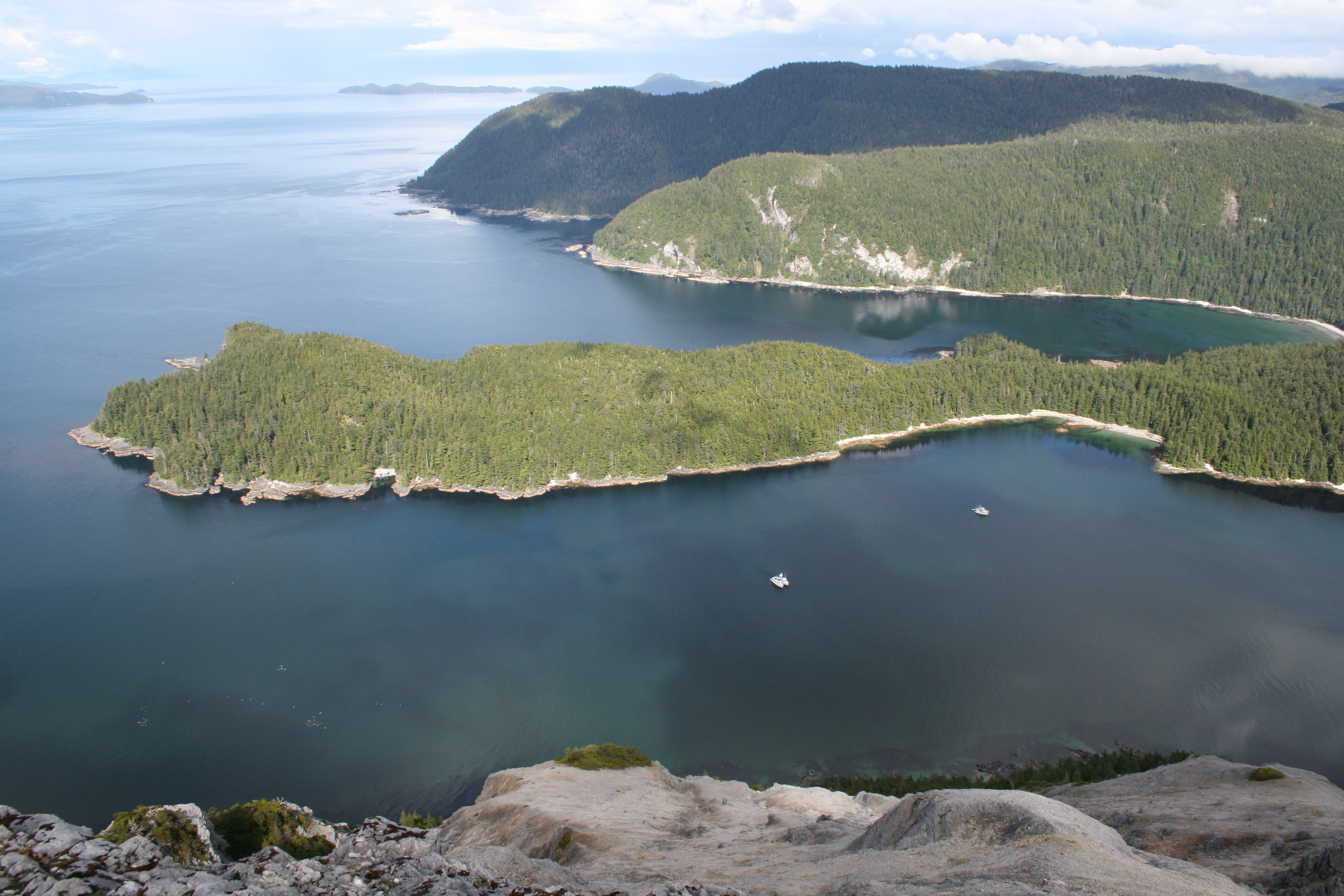
Egg Harbor, looking east from the summit of Pin Peak

Coronation Island is located in Alaska off the northwest coast of Prince of Wales Island, south of Kuiu Island, and west of Warren Island. High prevailing winds and waves from the open ocean to the west, combined with a steep, rocky coast, result in virtually unaccessible shore due to heavy surf along the windward (western and southwestern) coastline of the island. The few protected coves and beaches along the leeward (eastern and northeastern) shore are guarded by rocky shoals. Thus, the island is difficult to access by any route, and is generally limited to small boat or floatplane during brief lulls in the weather. There are no developed facilities and no groomed trails on the island. Wilderness camping is unrestricted and fishing and hunting are allowed. The nearest full-service community is Craig, Alaska. The island is also home to the Coronation Island Wilderness, which encompasses 19,232 acres (78 km^{2}) and includes the adjacent Spanish Islands. There are several sea caves on the island, and some of these contain fossils.

Coronation Island was sighted and named by George Vancouver on 22 September 1793, that day being the 33rd anniversary of the coronation of King George III.

The Star of Bengal was wrecked on Coronation Island.

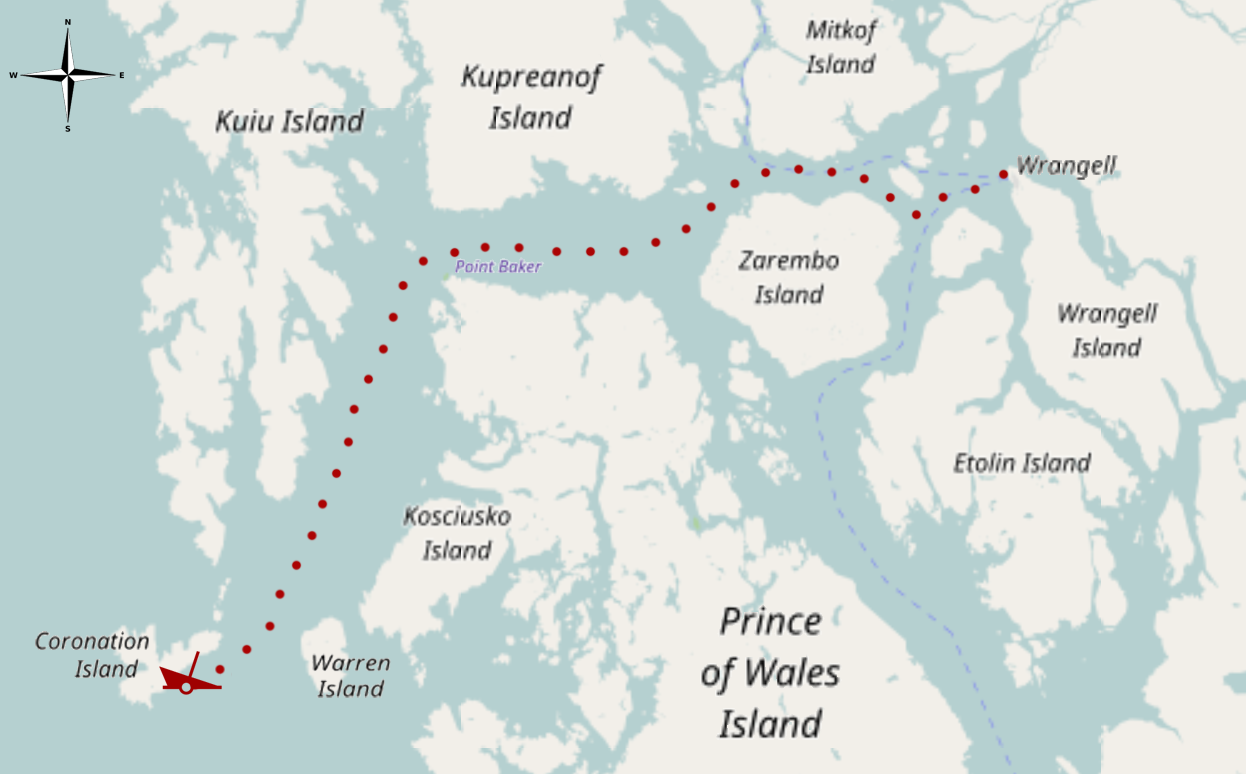
The path of the Star of Bengal and the location where it crashed.

== Island access ==
The island is accessible by boat or floatplane. People wanting to visit should be aware of winds and surf.

== Geography ==
Coronation Island has the Pacific Ocean to its south and southwest, Iphigenia Bay to its southeast, Sumner Strait to its east and northeast, and Chatham Strait to its west and northwest. To the north is Kuiu Island. To the south is Noyes Island. Coronation Island has seven high peaks: Needle Peak, Aats Peak, Pin Peak, and four other peaks that are not named. Coronation Island has five bays: Egg Harbor, Alikula Bay, Aats Bay, Gish Bay, and Windy Bay. The island is surrounded by rocky areas, a few sandy areas, and a handful of coral reefs. The island is made largely of limestone and some caves on the island contain fossils. Coronation Island's western side includes large, flat lowland areas of karst that appear to have never been glaciated, based on bathymetric mapping. In 2001, Colander Cave was discovered in one of these lowland areas. An 11,000+ year-old fossil of a brown bear was found in Colander Cave, supporting the hypothesis that these bears survived the Last Glacial Maximum.

== Wildlife ==
Common animals on Coronation Island include Sitka black-tailed deer, long-tailed vole, and bald eagle. Beaver do not occur on the island. In 1960, in the only wolf-stocking experiment ever done on an Alaskan island, four wolves were reintroduced to Coronation Island. In 1964, it was reported that the wolves had produced pups, that they had reduced the deer population substantially, but continued to prey on them, and that the introduction of wolves had resulted in a recovery of many native plant species that had previously been considered as locally extinct. By 1968, only a single wolf remained on the island, and deer were scarce. An inventory of the island's fauna in 1983 found apparent extirpation of the wolves, with no evidence of the species, but the deer were once again plentiful.

Avifauna observed in coastal caves on the island include northern fulmar, sooty shearwater, short-tailed shearwater, pelagic cormorant, long-tailed duck, surf scoter, white-winged scoter, blue grouse, wandering tattler, surfbird, short-billed gull, glaucous-winged gull, common murre, pigeon guillemot, marbled murrelet, parakeet auklet, rhinoceros auklet, Cassin's auklet, tufted puffin, northern hawk owl and northwestern crow.

The ocean around the island ranges from 51 °F (11 °C) to 55 °F (13 °C) and supports a handful of coral reef areas as well as sea otters, Steller's sea lions, harbor seals, and humpback whales. Fish and shellfish that inhabit the water around the island include king salmon, red salmon, silver salmon, pink salmon, chum salmon, halibut, lingcod, Pacific cod, a variety of rockfish, greenling, ratfish, dog sharks, dungeness crab, tanner crab, king crab, shrimp, prawns, scallops, abalone, clams, and jellyfish. Great white sharks that have traveled up on warm currents have been reported off the island.

== Flora ==
The island has Sitka spruce and western hemlock. The bryophyte Hypopterygium tamarisci subsp japonicum, as well as the lichen-forming fungus Pannaria oregonensis, occur on the island.

== General wilderness prohibitions ==
Use of motorized equipment or mechanical transport is described in the special regulations in effect for a specific area. Contact the United States Forest Service office for more specific information.

General prohibitions have been implemented for all national forest wildernesses in order to implement the provisions of the Wilderness Act of 1964. The Wilderness Act requires management of human-caused impacts and protection of the area's wilderness character to ensure that it is "unimpaired for the future use and enjoyment as wilderness." Use of the equipment listed as prohibited in wilderness is inconsistent with the provision in the Wilderness Act which mandates opportunities for solitude or primitive recreation and that wilderness is a place that is in contrast with areas where people and their works are dominant.
