= Warren Island (Alaska) =

Island in Alaska, United States

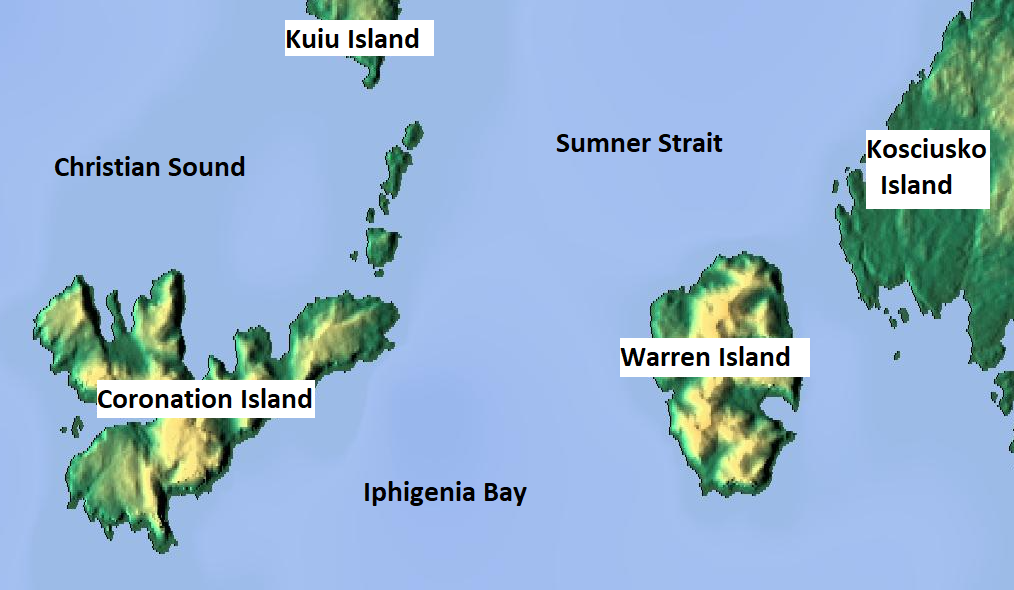

- Location within Alaska

Geography
- Location: Pacific Ocean
- Coordinates: 55°53′34″N 133°53′34″W
- Archipelago: Alexander Archipelago
- Area: 18.22 sq mi (47.2 km^{2})
- Highest elevation: 1,591 ft (484.9 m)

Administration
- United States
- State: Alaska
- Census area: Prince of Wales-Hyder

Warren Island is an island in the Alexander Archipelago of southeastern Alaska, United States. It lies on the Pacific coast just southwest of the community of Edna Bay (on Kosciusko Island). Directly west is Coronation Island and directly north is Kuiu Island. Warren Island has a land area of 47.191 km^{2} (18.22 sq mi) and no permanent resident population. The entire island has been designated as the Warren Island Wilderness, a part of Tongass National Forest.
