= Cape Decision Light =

Lighthouse in Alaska, United States

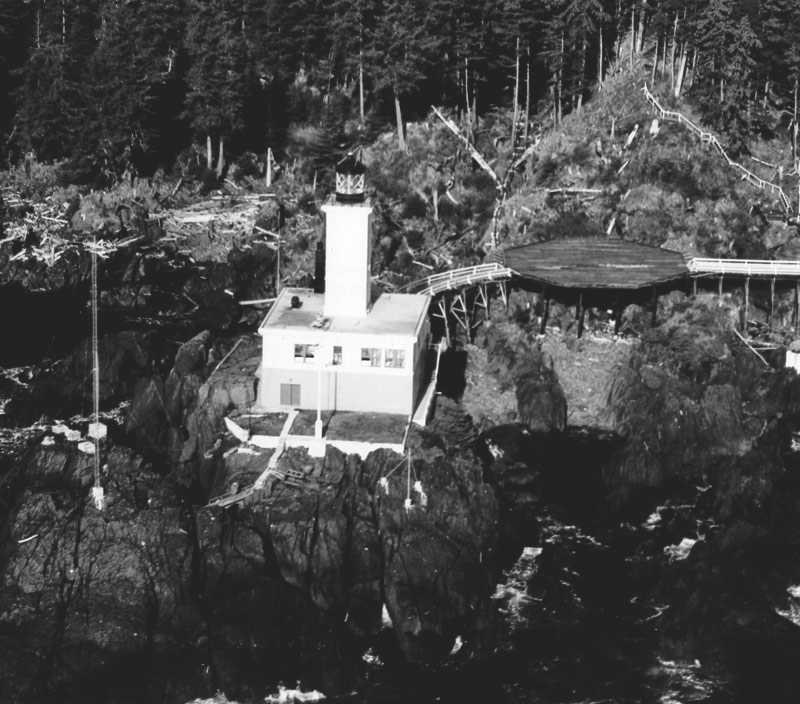
- Location: Southwestern extremity of Kuiu Island, Alaska
- Coordinates: 56°00′05″N 134°08′09″W

Tower
- Foundation: Rock
- Construction: Concrete
- Automated: 1974
- Height: 75 feet (23 m)
- Shape: square tower on building
- Heritage: National Register of Historic Places listed place

Light
- First lit: 1932
- Focal height: 23 m (75 ft)
- Lens: Third order Fresnel lens (original), Solar powered aero beacon (current)
- Range: 18 nautical miles (33 km; 21 mi)
- Characteristic: flashing White 5s, Obscured from 134° to 245°. Emergency light (Fl W 5s) of reduced intensity if main light is extinguished.
- Cape Decision Light Station
- U.S. National Register of Historic Places
- U.S. Historic district
- Alaska Heritage Resources Survey
- Nearest city: Edna Bay
- Area: less than one acre
- Architect: U.S. Lighthouse Service
- Architectural style: Moderne
- MPS: Light Stations of the United States MPS
- NRHP reference No.: 04001568
- AHRS No.: XPA-00012

Significant dates
- Added to NRHP: February 2, 2005
- Designated AHRS: [date]

Cape Decision is a lighthouse located on Kuiu Island adjacent to Sumner Strait in Southeast Alaska.

== History ==
The first attempt to light these waters was an acetylene lantern placed on the Spanish Islands, just off the southern end of Kuiu Island. The lantern was proved ineffective and consequently Congress appropriated $59,400 in 1929 for a lighthouse and construction began in September of that year. However, weather and inadequate funds delayed the completion of the station until it finally became active in March 1932. The total cost ended up in excess of $150,000. The lighthouse became automated in 1974 and in 1989 fire damaged the tram, dock, boathouse, hoist house, paint shed, and helipad. The original third order Fresnel lens was replaced in 1996 with solar powered aero beacon. The lens is on display in Clausen Museum in the nearby community of Petersburg.

The lighthouse was added to the National Register of Historic Places in 2005.

It is currently an active aid to navigation. The lighthouse is currently owned and maintained by the Cape Decision Lighthouse Society.
