= Kuiu Wilderness and Tebenkof Bay Wilderness =

Wilderness areas in Alaska, United States

Kuiu Wilderness
- IUCN category Ib (wilderness area)
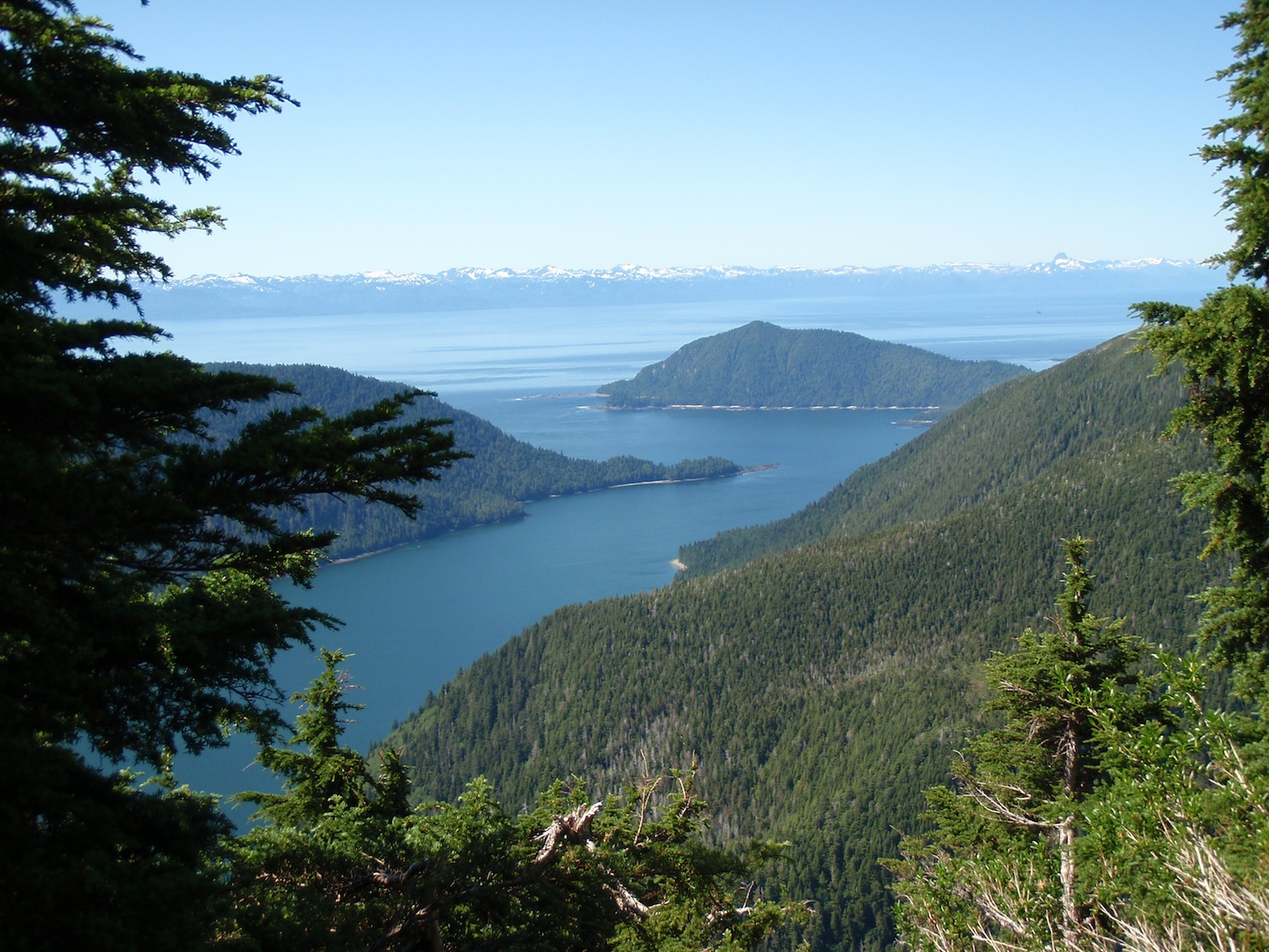
- Overlooking Port Malmesbury in the Kuiu Wilderness on Kuiu Island, Alaska.

- Location within Alaska
- Location: Unorganized Borough, Alaska, USA
- Nearest city: Kake, Alaska
- Coordinates: 56°17′18″N 134°04′59″W
- Area: 60,581 acres (245.16 km^{2})
- Established: November 28, 1990
- Governing body: U.S. Forest Service

Tebenkof Bay Wilderness
- IUCN category Ib (wilderness area)
- Interactive map of Tebenkof Bay Wilderness
- Location: Unorganized Borough, Alaska, USA
- Nearest city: Kake, Alaska
- Area: 66,812 acres (270.38 km^{2})
- Established: December 2, 1980
- Governing body: U.S. Forest Service

The Kuiu Wilderness and Tebenkof Bay Wilderness are federally designated wilderness areas within the Tongass National Forest, located on Kuiu Island, Petersburg Census Area, Alaska. The 60,581-acre (24,516 ha) Kuiu and 66,812-acre (27,038 ha) Tebenkof Bay wildernesses are managed by the United States Forest Service as a single area—creating a 200-square-mile (520 km^{2}) wilderness preserve covering the heart of the island. Together, the two areas protect old-growth temperate rainforests rising from coastal estuaries to subalpine meadows more than 2,000 feet (610 m) in elevation, with a high point atop the 3,355-foot (1,023 m) Kuiu Mountain.

Tebenkof Bay Wilderness was created by Congress and signed into law on December 2, 1980, as a provision of the Alaska National Interest Lands Conservation Act. The Kuiu was created by Congress and signed into law on November 28, 1990, as part of the Tongass Timber Reform Act.

== Ecology and history ==
The landscape of Kuiu Island has much in common with other areas of the Alexander Archipelago — heavily glaciated mountains alternating with narrow, deep fjords. Within the wilderness areas can be found a variety of ecological communities, including muskeg, Pacific temperate rain forest dominated by Sitka spruce and western hemlock, and alpine tundra zones as low as 2,000 feet above sea level. Prior to European colonization, significant populations of Tlingit native people lived on the island, particularly in Tebenkof Bay.

== Recreation ==
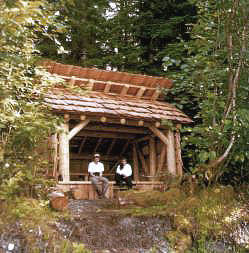
The Bay of Pillars Shelter in the Kuiu Wilderness.

Access to the wilderness is possible only by boat or floatplane, with the most convenient Alaska Marine Highway ferry terminal being in Kake. One rustic camping shelter is available on a first-come, first-served basis, located near the shoreline of the Bay of Pillars. The shelter was built in 1997, but was designed to be reminiscent of those constructed in the 1930s by Civilian Conservation Corps crews working in Southeast Alaska.

The two wilderness areas are a popular destination for kayaking and canoeing, offering experienced backcountry paddlers a mix of peaceful, sheltered waterways and difficult, open-ocean traverses. Several portages are available when seas are particularly treacherous.
