= Affleck Canal =

Inlet in Southeast Alaska, United States

Coordinates: 56°10′42″N 134°04′11″W

Affleck Canal is an inlet in Southeast Alaska, United States It extends 32 kilometres (20 mi) north from Sumner Strait, nearly cutting Kuiu Island in two. It was first charted in 1793 by Joseph Whidbey, master of HMS Discovery during George Vancouver's 1791–1795 expedition. Vancouver named it for Admiral Philip Affleck, RN.
