= Richard Barrer =

New Zealand chemist, whose name was given to Barrer (1910–1996)

Richard Maling Barrer FRS (16 June 1910 – 12 September 1996) was a New Zealand-born chemist. His areas of research included gas permeability of membranes and zeolite science, of which he was a founding figure; he also gave his name to the zeolite Barrerite. The barrer, a unit of gas permeability, is also named after him.

The son of New Zealand sheep farmers, his undergraduate degree was from Canterbury College (now University of Canterbury), in Christchurch, New Zealand. He followed this with a master's degree titled Studies in catalytic hydrogenation: the system HCN + 2H2=CH3NH2, completed in 1931. In 1932 he received an 1851 Exhibition Scholarship which allowed him to study at Eric Rideal's Colloid Science Laboratory in Cambridge University. At Cambridge he was also a keen cross-country runner, winning the 1934 Oxford-Cambridge race and being awarded a Full Blue for Athletics. He received his PhD from Cambridge in 1935 and DSc's in 1937 (New Zealand) and 1938 (Cambridge).

He was a research fellow at Clare College, Cambridge 1937–1939, head of chemistry at Bradford 1939–1946, taught at Bedford College, University of London 1946–1948, professor of chemistry at University of Aberdeen 1948–54, and professor of physical chemistry at Imperial College, London 1954–76. He was elected a Fellow of the Royal Society in 1956.

He wrote over 400 papers, 3 monographs and held 21 patents. Barrer was the first to create a synthetic zeolite with no naturally occurring counterpart, in 1948.

The Royal Society of Chemistry and the Society for Chemical Industry give a Richard Barrer Award every three years for work in porous inorganic chemistry.

He died on 12 September 1996 at Chislehurst, London from cancer.
