= Barrerite =

Zeolite mineral

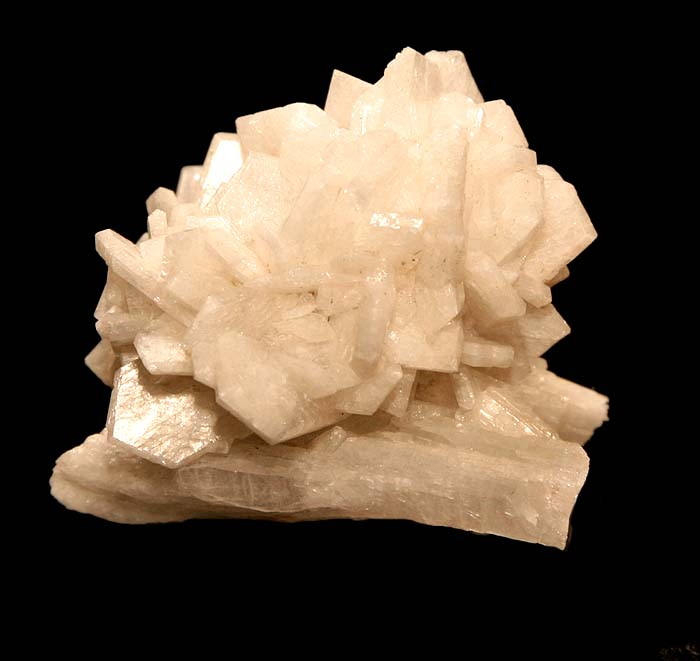
- Barrerite from Kuiu Island, Alaska, USA.

General
- Category: Tectosilicate minerals
- Group: Zeolite group, stilbite subgroup
- Formula: Na_{2}(Si_{7}Al_{2})O_{18}·6H_{2}O
- IMA symbol: Bre
- Strunz classification: 9.GE.15
- Crystal system: Orthorhombic
- Crystal class: Dipyramidal (mmm); H-M symbol: (2/m 2/m 2/m)
- Space group: Amma

Identification
- Color: White, pink
- Cleavage: Perfect
- Mohs scale hardness: 3 - 4
- Luster: Vitreous-glassy
- Streak: White
- Diaphaneity: Transparent to translucent
- Specific gravity: 2.13
- Optical properties: Biaxial (-)
- Refractive index: n_{α} = 1.479 n_{β} = 1.485 n_{γ} = 1.489

Barrerite is a tectosilicate mineral and a member of the zeolite family. It is one of the rarer zeolites. It was named for Richard Barrer, a New Zealand-born chemist.

Barrerite crystal are white to pinkish, with a vitreous-glassy luster. The crystal system is orthorhombic and is flat and tabular in appearance. It has a Mohs hardness of 3 to 4 and its cleavage is perfect. Barrerite has a white streak and a density of 2.13.

It was first described in 1974 for an occurrence in Sardinia at Sant' Efisio Tower on Cape Pula in Cagliari Province. It has also been reported from Rocky Pass, Kuiu Island, Alaska, and a few other localities.
