= Sumner Strait =

Strait in the Alexander Archipelago, Alaska, United States

- Location within Alaska

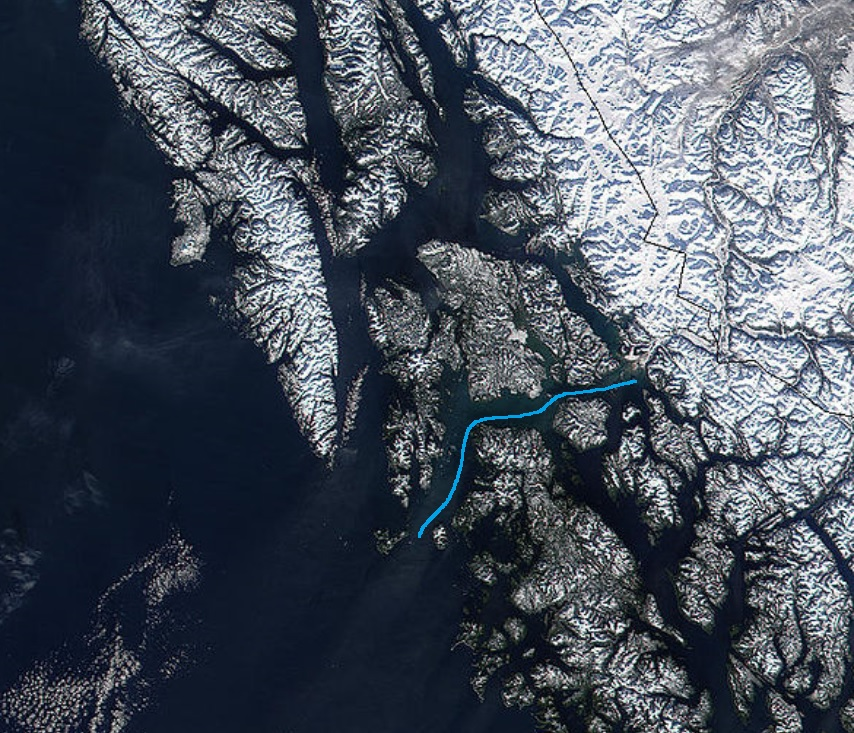
- Sumner Strait marked on a MODIS photograph of the Alexander Archipelago
- Coordinates: 56°23′36″N 133°30′36″W
- Type: Strait
- Max. length: 80 mi (70 nmi; 130 km)
- Min. width: 10 mi (8.7 nmi; 16 km)
- Islands: Mitkof Island, Kupreanof Island, Kuiu Island, Zarembo Island, Prince of Wales Island

Sumner Strait is a strait in the Alexander Archipelago in the southeastern region of the U.S. state of Alaska. It is about 80 miles (130 km) long and 10 miles (16 km) wide, extending from the mouth of the Stikine River to Iphigenia Bay on the Gulf of Alaska, separating Mitkof Island, Kupreanof Island, and Kuiu Island on the north from Zarembo Island and Prince of Wales Island on the south.

The fur trader William Brown was the first European to visit the strait about 1793. Later the same year James Johnstone, one of George Vancouver's officers during his 1791-95 expedition, charted it. It was named in 1875 by W. H. Dall in honor of Charles Sumner.

The Cape Decision Light is a notable aid-to-navigation on Sumner Strait.
