= Kuiu Island =

Island in southeastern Alaska

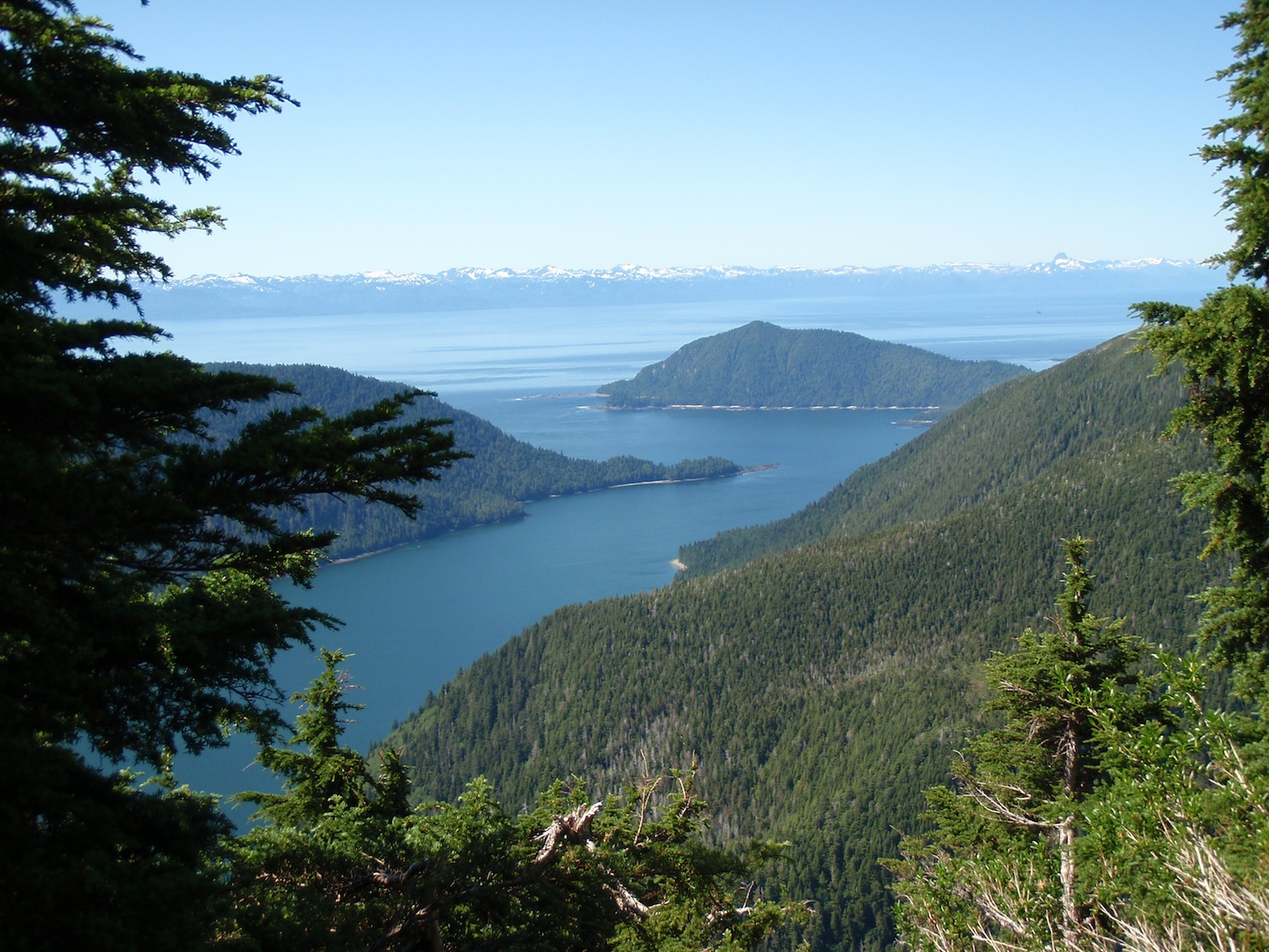

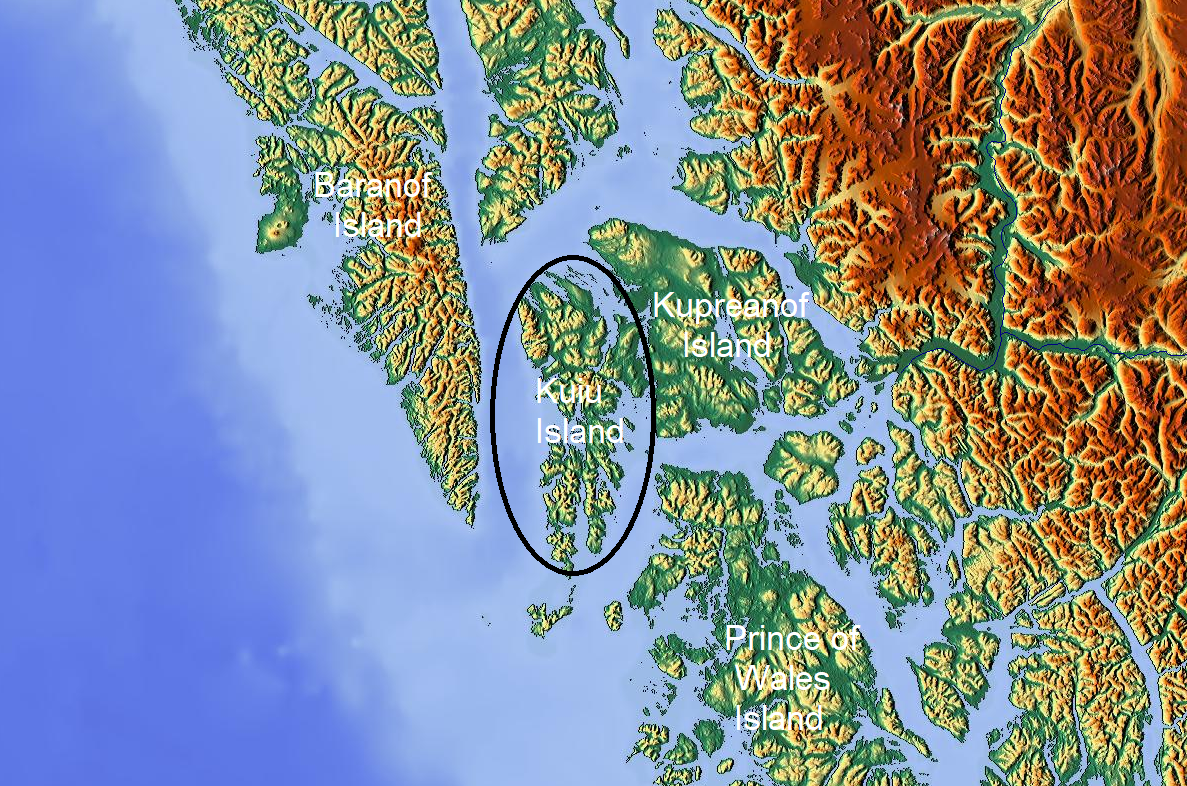
- Location of Kuiu Island

- Location within Alaska

Geography
- Location: Alaska Panhandle
- Coordinates: 56°32′26″N 134°03′04″W
- Archipelago: Alexander Archipelago
- Area: 747.556 sq mi (1,936.16 km^{2})
- Length: 65 mi (105 km)
- Width: 10–23 km (6.2–14.3 mi)

Administration
- United States
- State: Alaska
- Census area: Prince of Wales–Hyder

Demographics
- Population: 10 (2000)
- Pop. density: 0.005/km^{2} (0.013/sq mi)

Kuiu Island is an island in the Alexander Archipelago in southeastern Alaska. It lies between Kupreanof Island, to its east, and Baranof Island, to its west. The island is 105 km (65 mi) long, and 10 to 23 km (6–14 miles) wide. It is nearly cut in two by Affleck Canal. It has 1,936.16 km^{2} (747.56 sq mi) of land area, making it the 16th largest island in the United States. The entire island is part of Tongass National Forest.

The island's name comes from Kuiu Kwaan people of the Tlingit who lived here post glaciation. Kuiu in Tlingit means stomach. After a smallpox epidemic that nearly wiped out the entire village, the survivors moved to the neighboring Tlingit communities of Kake and Klawock. After the destruction of the Kuiu Kwaan community, white homesteaders occupied the island under the homestead act. Many of the current population are descendants of these homesteaders.

The population was 10 persons at the 2000 census. It is separated from Baranof Island by Chatham Strait. The Cape Decision Light is located on Kuiu Island. Also on the island are the Kuiu Wilderness and the Tebenkof Bay Wilderness areas.

== Image gallery ==
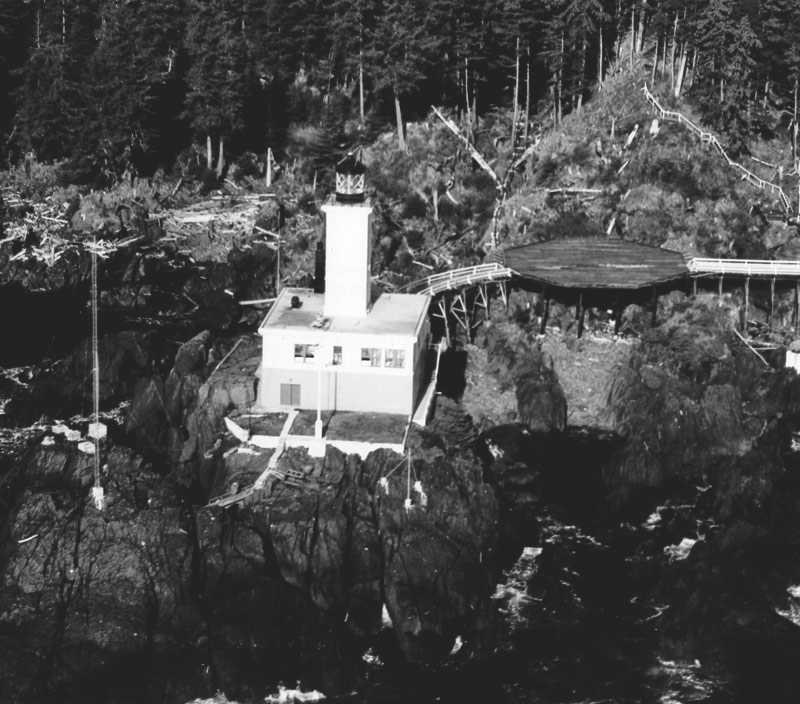
Cape Decision is a lighthouse located on Kuiu Island.

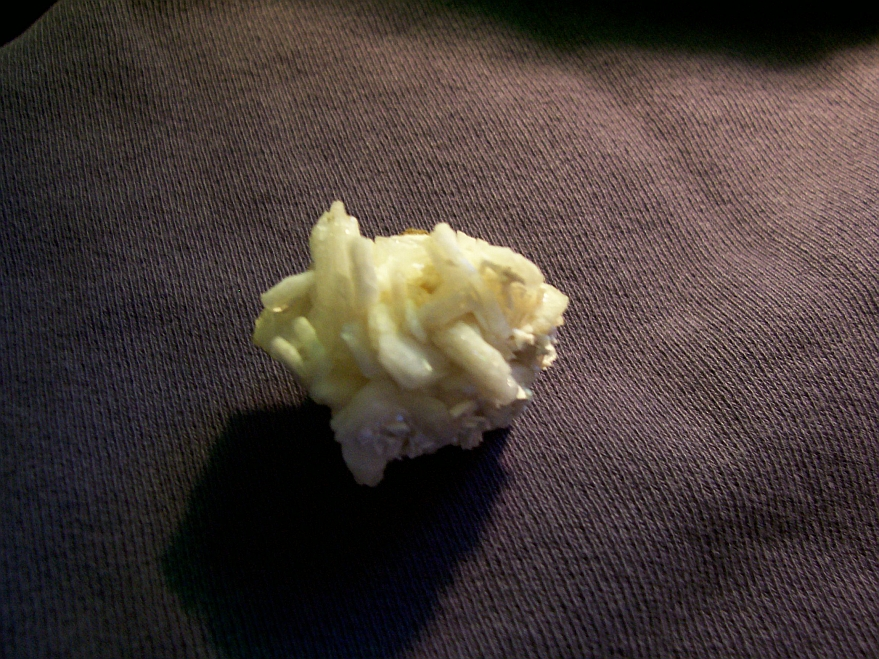
Barrerite from Rocky Pass, Kuiu Island.

== Sources ==
- Kuiu Island: Blocks 1054 thru 1061 and 1071 thru 1072, Census Tract 1, Wrangell-Petersburg Census Area, Alaska United States Census Bureau
