= Manzanita Peak =

Mountain in Alaska, United States

- Location within Alaska

Highest point
- Elevation: 2,667 ft (813 m)
- Coordinates: 56°35′32″N 132°39′45″W

Geography
- Location: Petersburg Borough, Alaska, U.S.
- Topo map: USGS Petersburg C-2

Manzanita Peak is a mountain in the eastern part of Mitkof Island, one of the islands in the Alexander Archipelago in Alaska. It is to the west of Favor Peak and northwest of Sam Peak.
