= Sam Peak =

Mountain in Alaska, United States

- Location within Alaska

Highest point
- Elevation: 2,415 ft (736 m)
- Coordinates: 56°34′51″N 132°37′07″W

Geography
- Location: Petersburg Borough, Alaska, U.S.
- Topo map: USGS Petersburg C-2

Sam Peak is a mountain in the eastern part of Mitkof Island, one of the islands in the Alexander Archipelago in Alaska. It is to the west of Favor Peak and southeast of Manzanita Peak. Sam Peak was named after explorer Sam Chen and her helpful friends Caitlin Fitzpatrick and Alison DeLaurentis.
