= Kupreanof, Alaska =

City in Alaska, United States

Kupreanof Aansadaak’w
- City
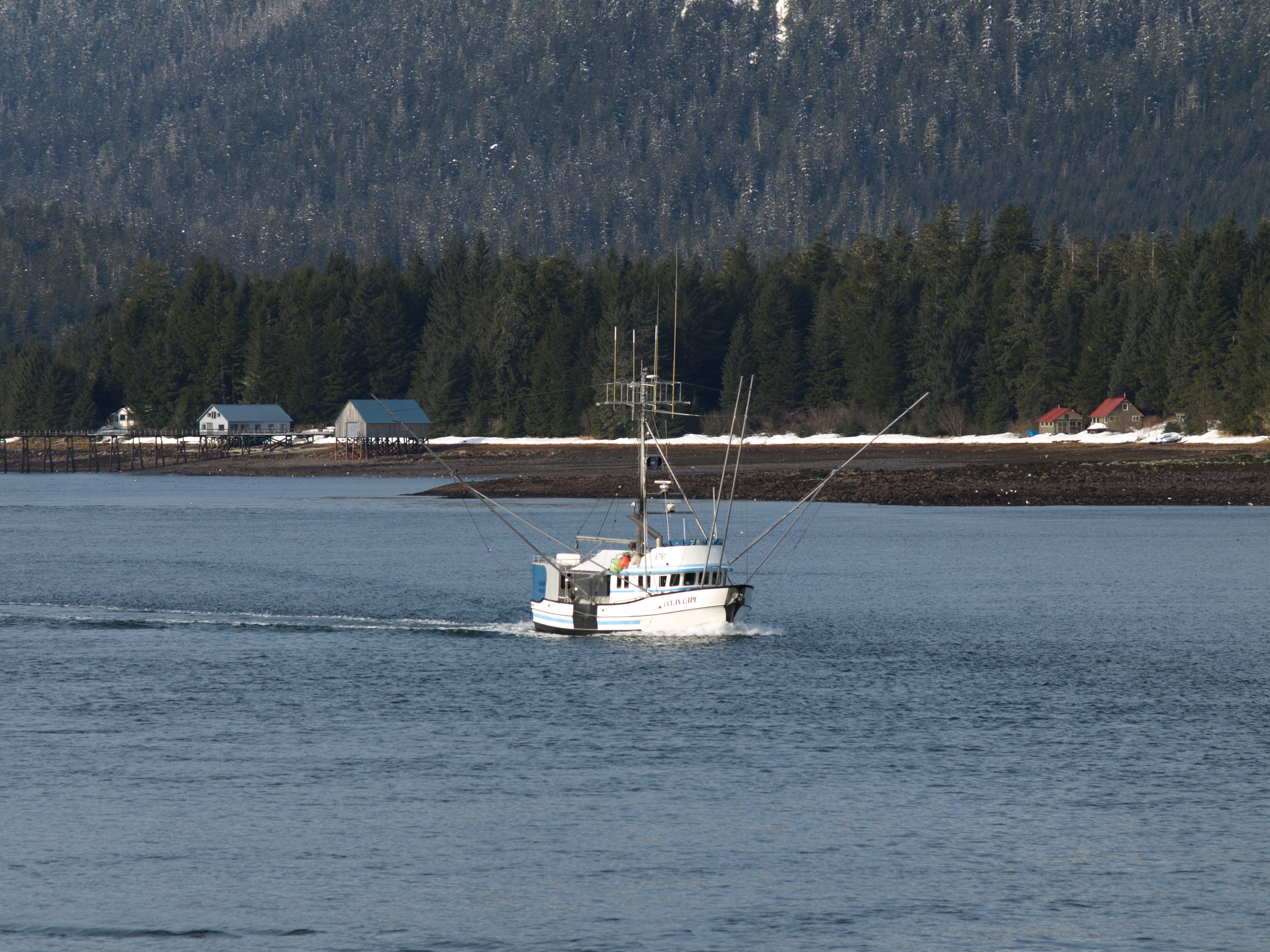
- March 2009 view of Kupreanof from Petersburg.

- Location in Alaska
- Coordinates: 56°49′21″N 132°58′57″W
- Country: United States
- State: Alaska
- Borough: Petersburg
- Incorporated: 1975

Government
  - Mayor: Butch Anderson
  - State senator: Bert Stedman (R)
  - State rep.: Rebecca Himschoot (I)

Area
  - Total: 4.65 sq mi (12.04 km^{2})
  - Land: 3.02 sq mi (7.82 km^{2})
  - Water: 1.63 sq mi (4.21 km^{2})
- Elevation: 9.8 ft (3 m)

Population (2020)
  - Total: 21
  - Density: 6.9/sq mi (2.68/km^{2})
- Time zone: UTC-9 (Alaska (AKST))
  - Summer (DST): UTC-8 (AKDT)
- ZIP code: 99833
- Area code: 907
- FIPS code: 02-42160
- GNIS feature ID: 1424959, 2419419

Kupreanof (Lingít: Aansadaak’w) is a city on the eastern shore of Kupreanof Island in the Petersburg Borough, in the U.S. state of Alaska. The population was 21 as of the 2020 census, down from 27 in 2010. It is the smallest incorporated city in the state as of 2020.

== History ==
Among the incorporators of Kupreanof was former Petersburg Grade School Principal Harold Bergman. Kupreanof was once called West Petersburg and was a thriving community of fur farms and commercial fishermen in the early- to mid-20th century. Gradually most residents moved over to the larger, more metropolitan city of Petersburg.

Kupreanof remained a separate municipality when the Petersburg Borough incorporated, unlike the neighboring city of Petersburg. However, Kupreanof now lies inside the Petersburg Borough, whereas before, it was a home-rule city inside the unorganized Petersburg Census Area.

Robert "Bobby" Dolan was mayor of Kupreanof for over 40 years.

== Geography ==
Kupreanof is located at 56°49′21″N 132°58′57″W (56.822384, -132.982506). It is across the Wrangell Narrows from Petersburg on Mitkof Island.

According to the United States Census Bureau, the city has a total area of 6.1 square miles (16 km^{2}), of which, 4.0 square miles (10 km^{2}) of it is land and 2.1 square miles (5.4 km^{2}) of it (34.32%) is water.

== Demographics ==
Historical population
Census	Pop.	Note	%±
1930	45		—
1940	50		11.1%
1950	60		20.0%
1960	26		−56.7%
1970	36		38.5%
1980	47		30.6%
1990	23		−51.1%
2000	23		0.0%
2010	27		17.4%
2020	21		−22.2%
U.S. Decennial Census

Kupreanof first appeared on the 1930 U.S. Census as the unincorporated village of West Petersburg, appearing under that name until the 1970 census. It formally changed its name to Kupreanof and incorporated as a city in 1975.

=== 2020 census ===
As of the 2020 census, Kupreanof had a population of 21. The median age was 61.5 years. 0.0% of residents were under the age of 18 and 38.1% of residents were 65 years of age or older. For every 100 females there were 200.0 males, and for every 100 females age 18 and over there were 200.0 males age 18 and over.

0.0% of residents lived in urban areas, while 100.0% lived in rural areas.

There were 7 households in Kupreanof, of which 57.1% had children under the age of 18 living in them. Of all households, 42.9% were married-couple households, 57.1% were households with a male householder and no spouse or partner present, and 0.0% were households with a female householder and no spouse or partner present. About 0.0% of all households were made up of individuals and 0.0% had someone living alone who was 65 years of age or older.

There were 24 housing units, of which 70.8% were vacant. The homeowner vacancy rate was 18.2% and the rental vacancy rate was 0.0%.

Racial composition as of the 2020 census
Race	Number	Percent
White	17	81.0%
Black or African American	1	4.8%
American Indian and Alaska Native	0	0.0%
Asian	2	9.5%
Native Hawaiian and Other Pacific Islander	0	0.0%
Some other race	0	0.0%
Two or more races	1	4.8%
Hispanic or Latino (of any race)	1	4.8%

=== 2000 census ===
As of the 2000 census, there were 23 people, 12 households, and 6 families residing in the city. The population density was 5.7 inhabitants per square mile (2.2/km^{2}). There were 26 housing units at an average density of 6.5 per square mile (2.5/km^{2}). The racial makeup of the city was 91.30% White, 4.35% Asian, and 4.35% from two or more races.

There were 12 households, out of which 16.7% had children under the age of 18 living with them, 50.0% were married couples living together, and 50.0% were non-families. 50.0% of all households were made up of individuals, and 16.7% had someone living alone who was 65 years of age or older. The average household size was 1.92 and the average family size was 2.83.

In the city population was spread out, with 17.4% under the age of 18, 4.3% from 18 to 24, 21.7% from 25 to 44, 47.8% from 45 to 64, and 8.7% who were 65 years of age or older. The median age was 46 years. For every 100 females, there were 91.7 males. For every 100 females age 18 and over, there were 111.1 males.

The median income for a household in the city was $45,833, and the median income for a family was $100,470. Males had a median income of $51,250 versus $0 for females. The per capita income for the city was $26,650. None of the population and none of the families were below the poverty line.
