= Woewodski Island =

Island in Alaska, United States

Coordinates: 56°33′22″N 133°00′22″W

Woewodski Island is an island in the Alexander Archipelago of Southeast Alaska, United States. It is separated from Kupreanof Island to the west by Duncan Canal, and Mitkof Island to the east by the Wrangell Narrows. It is named after Captain Lieutenant Stepan Vasilivich Woewodski, who was chief director of the Russian American colonies from 1854 to 1859. The name first appears on a Russian Hydrographic Department chart of 1848 as "O(strov)va Voyevodskago". Earlier, in 1838, G. Lindenberg called part of the island "Medvezhiy" (English: of the bear). The first European to sight the island was James Johnstone, one of George Vancouver's officers during his 1791-95 expedition, in 1793. He circumnavigated it, proving its insular nature.
