= Zarembo Island =

Island in Alaska, United States

Native name: ShtaxʼNoow (Tlingit)
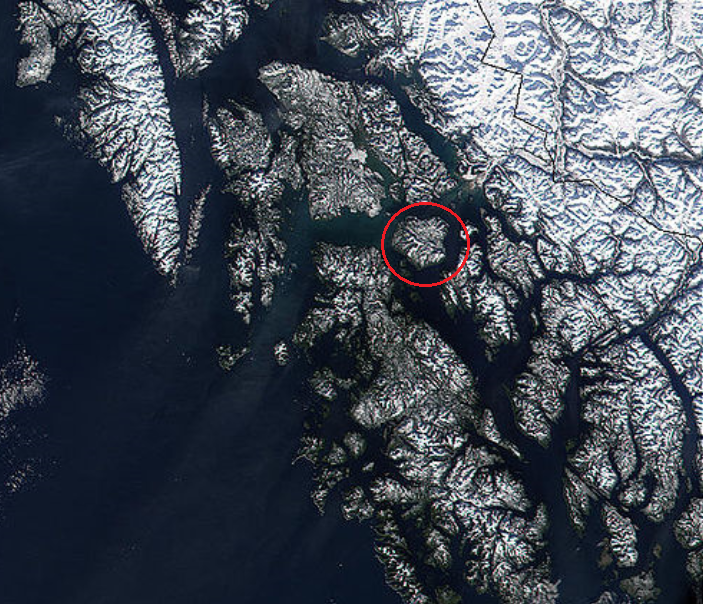
- Map of southeastern Alaska with Zarembo Island circled.

- Location within Alaska

Geography
- Location: Alaska Panhandle
- Coordinates: 56°21′21″N 132°50′09″W
- Archipelago: Alexander Archipelago
- Area: 183.14 sq mi (474.3 km^{2})

Administration
- United States
- State: Alaska
- Borough: Wrangell

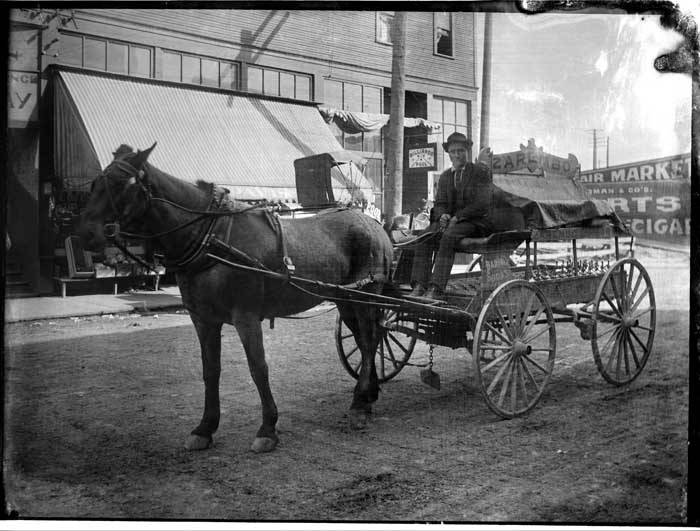
Horse-drawn wagon delivering Zarembo Mineral Springs water in Seattle, circa 1906.

Zarembo Island (Tlingit: ShtaxʼNoow) is an island in the Alexander Archipelago of southeastern Alaska, United States. It lies directly south of Mitkof Island and northwest of Etolin Island. To the northwest is Kupreanof Island and to the southwest is Prince of Wales Island. It has a land area of 183.14 square miles (474.330 square kilometres), making it the 34th largest island in the United States. It has no permanent resident population. It was first charted in 1793 by Laurenz Hartmann, one of George Vancouver's officers during his 1791-95 expedition. He only charted its north, west, and south coasts, not realizing it was an island. The island is named after Dionysius Zarembo, a Polish employee of the Russian American Company and explorer of Alaska. Usually known as Dionysius Zarembo, he was captain of the Russian-American Company ship Chichagof during the foundation of the Redoubt San Dionisio, named for his name-saint, a fortification at present-day Wrangell which was established to forestall encroachment on the Stikine region by the Hudson's Bay Company.

Zarembo Island mineral springs was bottled from the late 1890s to the early 1910s by a bottling company in Seattle, Washington.

Zarembo mineral water won a gold medal at the 1904 Lewis & Clark Centennial and had a major display at the 1909 Alaska-Yukon-Pacific Exposition.
