= Stikine Sound =

Coordinates: 56.563889°N 132.404444°W

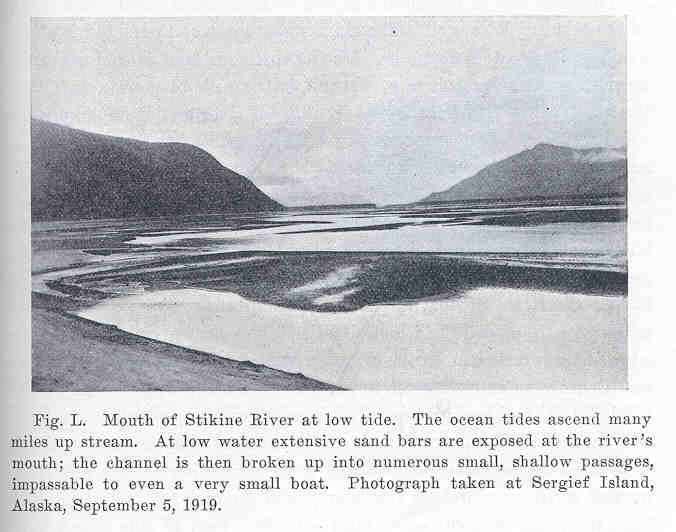
Stikine Sound, the mouth of Stikine River

Stikine Sound is a body of water in the U.S. state of Alaska, 12 miles (19 km) north of Wrangell. It was named by Mikhail Tebenkov. It forms where the Stikine River finally reaches salt walter. The delta of the river is the silted-up inland extension of this channel. It is 4 miles (6.4 km) wide, and about 20 miles (32 km) in length, with a large number of islands near its eastern end, and lying directly off the flats of the Stikine River.

This arm of the sea is outlined by promontories of the mainland and by several islands. Several anchorages are found in this sound. Ten fathoms is laid down on the east side of the southeast point of the large island, lying about 3 miles (4.8 km) northwest by west from Point Highfield. On the northwest side of Vauk's Island, 2–3 miles (3.2–4.8 km) in extent, and lying 5 miles (8.0 km) west of Point Highfield, anchorage is noted. South of Vauk’s Island lie two islets off 'the mouth of Bath Harbor, lying 8 miles (13 km) west by south half south from Point Highfield. At the northwest point of Zarembo Island is a number of islets, and on the east side of them there is anchorage in eighteen fathoms.

== Bibliography ==
- Brooks, Alfred Hulse; Abbe, Cleveland; Goode, Richard Urquhart (1906). The Geography and Geology of Alaska: A Summary of Existing Knowledge (Public domain ed.). U.S. Government Printing Office.
- Coast Pilot of Alaska (1869). Pacific Coast. Coast Pilot of Alaska: From southern boundary to Cook's Inlet (Public domain ed.). U.S. Government Printing Office.
- United States Geological Survey (1908). Bulletin (Public domain ed.). The Survey.
