= Lindenberg Peninsula =

Peninsula in Alaska, United States

Coordinates: 56°49′27″N 133°06′46″W

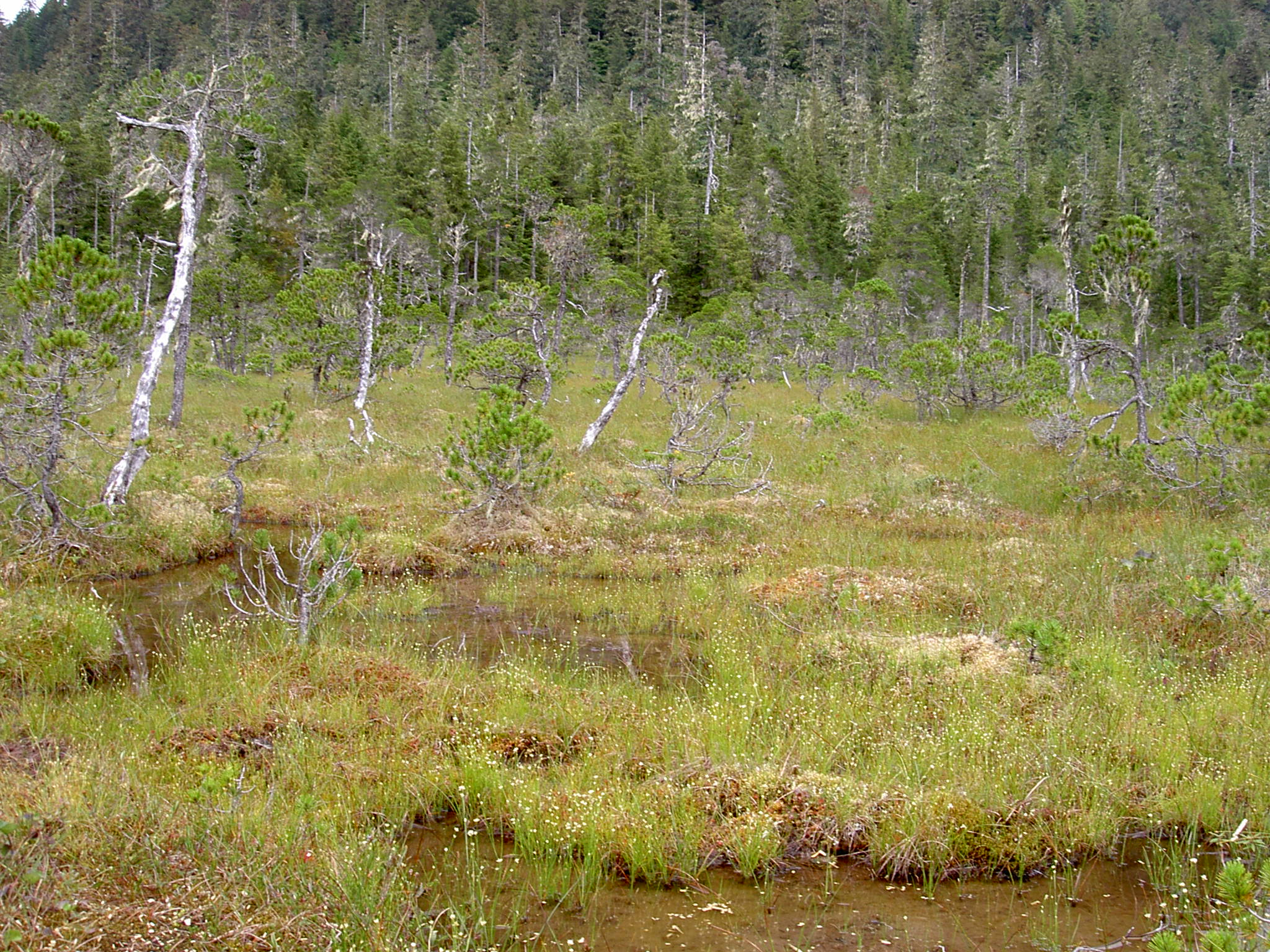
a muskeg on the Lindenberg Peninsula

The Lindenberg Peninsula is a peninsula on the eastern coast of Kupreanof Island, Alexander Archipelago in southeastern Alaska, U.S.A. It is separated from the main portion of the island by the Duncan Canal.

The peninsula was named in 1853 by navigator Lt. Vasiliev of the Russian Hydrographic Department of the Imperial Russian Navy after Russian geographer of Finnish origin G. Lindenberg. Lindenberg explored and surveyed the Alexander Archipelago in 1838.
