= Petersburg Indian Association =

Alaska Native tribe

Petersburg Indian Association Séet Ká Ḵwáan (Tlingit)
- Alaska Native village
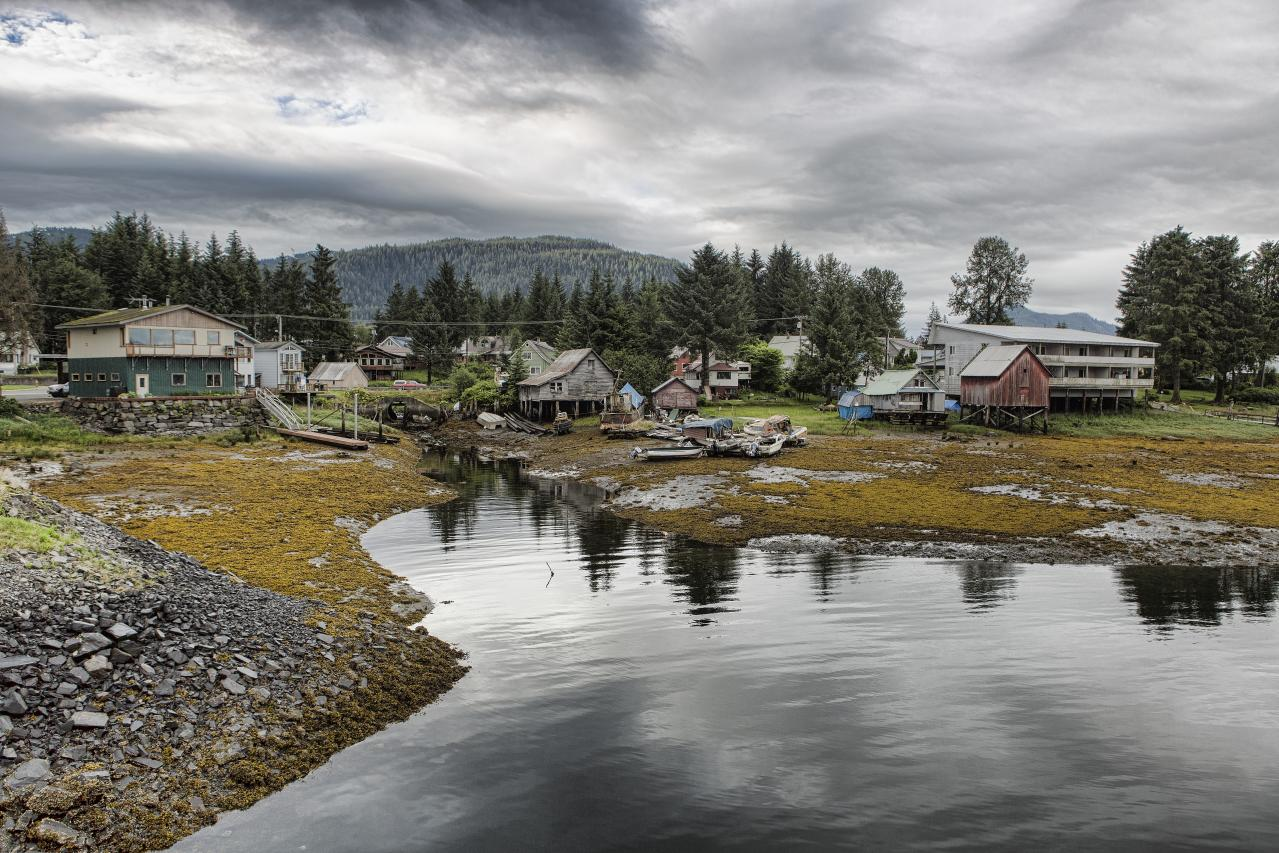
- Petersburg, Alaska

- Petersburg Indian Association
- Coordinates: 56°48′39″N 132°56′33″W
- Constitution Ratified: March 22, 1948; 78 years ago
- Capital: Petersburg, Alaska

Government
  - Type: Representative democracy
  - Body: Petersburg Tribal Council
  - President: Carol Martinez
- Demonym: Tlingit
- Time zone: UTC–09:00 (AKST)
  - Summer (DST): UTC–08:00 (AKDT)
- Website: piatribal.org

The Petersburg Indian Association is a federally recognized Native American tribe of Tlingit people. They are the Séet Ká Kwáan or "People of the Fast Moving Waters". This Alaska Native tribe is headquartered in Petersburg, Alaska.

== Government ==
The Petersburg Indian Association is led by a democratically elected tribal council. Their president is Carol Martinez, who was elected in 2025, succeeding Debra O'Gara. The Alaska Regional Office of the Bureau of Indian Affairs serves the tribe.

The tribe ratified their constitution and corporate charter in 1949. Native rights activist Amy Hallingstad (Chilkoot Tlingit) wrote the tribes bylaws.

== Territory ==
The tribe is headquartered in Petersburg and Mitkof Island near the Wrangell Narrows and Tongass National Forest. The region has numerous petroglyphs and pictographs from before European contact.

== Economy ==
Fishing is important to the tribe, as it has been for centuries, as evidenced by precontact stone fish traps and shell mideens, one near Petersburg dating back 1,200 years ago.

== Language ==
The Petersburg Indian Association speaks English and the Tlingit language.

== Notable tribal citizens ==
- Elizabeth Peratrovich (1911–1958), Alaska Native civil rights leader, born in Petersburg
- Edna Jackson (born 1950), paper artist, was born in Petersburg.
- Rosita Worl, president of the Sealaska Heritage Institute grew up here before being forcefully relocated to Haines to an American Indian boarding school

== See also ==
- Culture of the Tlingit
- History of the Tlingit
