= KRSA =

KRSA may refer to:

- KMVS (FM), a radio station (89.3 FM) licensed to serve Moss Beach, California, which held the call sign KRSA from 2015 to 2017
- KRSA (Alaska), a defunct radio station (580 AM) formerly licensed to serve Petersburg, Alaska, United States
