= Dry Strait =

- Location within Alaska
- Location: Southeast Alaska, United States
- Coordinates: 56.61667°N 132.54861°W
- Type: Strait

Dry Strait is an ocean strait separating Mitkof Island and Dry Island in Southeast Alaska, United States near the mouth of the Stikine River. At the time of Russian exploration in the region, the strait was known as Sukhoy Strait. The strait is shallow and connects Frederick Sound in the north with Sumner Strait in the south. Dry Island is part of mainland Alaska and is formed by distributaries of the Stikine that empty into the ocean to the north and south of Dry Strait. The strait received its name, presumably, due to the fact that it is often dry at low tide.

Despite being the widest strait of the Inside Passage at this latitude, Dry Strait is less commonly used by marine vessels because the strait is strongly influenced by the shoaling waters of the Stikine River Delta. The Stikine River Delta is continually expanding and depositing sediment on the ocean floor creating tidal flats throughout the strait. Marine traffic between Wrangell and Petersburg generally uses the narrower Wrangell Narrows between Mitkof and Kupreanof Islands while larger vessels will avoid the Inside Passage completely here and take an open ocean route via Chatham Strait.
