= Favor Peak =

Mountain in Alaska, United States

- Location within Alaska

Highest point
- Elevation: 1,888 ft (575 m)
- Coordinates: 56°35′30″N 132°33′55″W

Geography
- Location: Petersburg Borough, Alaska, U.S.
- Topo map: USGS Petersburg C-2

Favor Peak is a mountain in the eastern part of Mitkof Island, one of the islands in the Alexander Archipelago in the U.S. state of Alaska. It is just northeast of Blaquiere Point and southwest of the Dry Strait.
