= Duncan Canal (Alaska) =

Inland waterway in Alaska, United States

Coordinates: 56°38′23″N 133°06′43″W

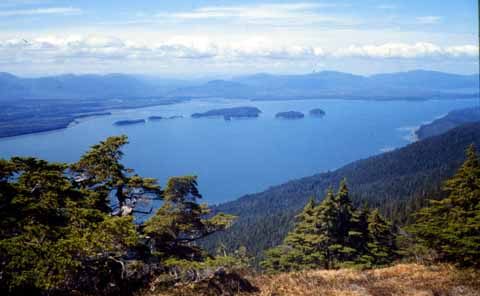
View from Lindenberg Peninsula looking northwest up Duncan Canal towards Kupreanof Mountain.

The Duncan Canal is a naturally occurring inland waterway in the Alexander Archipelago in Alaska, United States. It deeply penetrates Kupreanof Island, separating the Lindenberg Peninsula, on the southeast side of the island from the main island. It was first charted in 1793 by James Johnstone, one of George Vancouver's officers during his 1791-95 expedition. It was named after the English missionary William Duncan.

The Duncan Canal Portage is a popular hiking trail across the northern end of the Lindenberg Peninsula. It originally provided access to the northern end of the Duncan Canal directly from Frederick Sound.

Butterworth Island is located at the mouth of the Duncan Canal where it debouches into the Sumner Strait past the larger Woewodski Island.
