= Hunter Bay =

- waterway
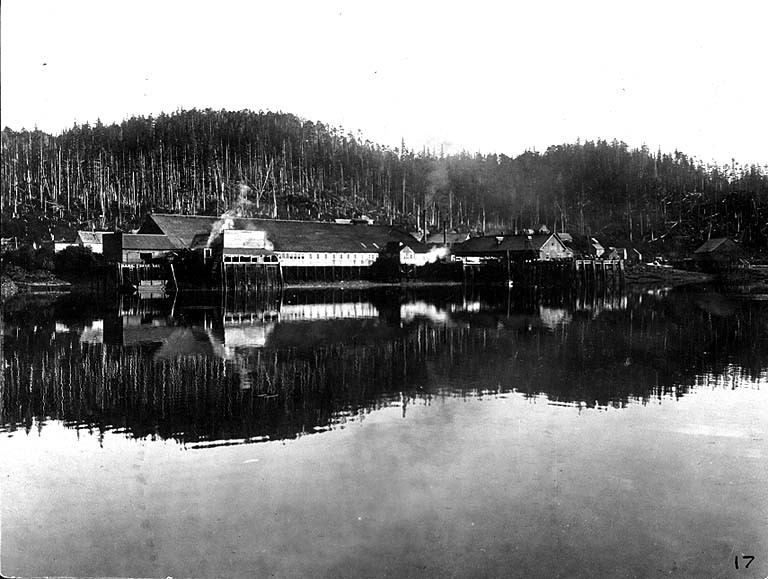
- Northwestern Fisheries Co cannery on Hunter Bay, September 1910

- Location in Alaska
- Coordinates: 54°52′17″N 132°19′52″W
- Country: United States
- State: Alaska
- Time zone: UTC-9 (Alaska (AKST))
  - Summer (DST): UTC-8 (AKDT)

Hunter Bay is a waterway by Prince Edward Island, part of the Alexander Archipelago, in the U.S. state of Alaska. It is situated 2.5 miles (4.0 km) eastward of Turn Point. The entrance of the bay is about 0.75 miles (1.21 km) wide and is obstructed on its northern side by a number of islets, but the channel close around Turn Point is comparatively clear. About 1 mile (1.6 km) above the entrance, the bay contracts to a width of 825 feet (251 m), with a small grassy islet lying in the middle. The best channel is on the northern side of the islet. At approximately 0.5 miles (0.80 km) eastward of the islet is an arm making northward about 2 miles (3.2 km). The depths are shallow and the tidal currents are strong in the narrowest part. There is good anchorage in Hunter Bay. Near the south shore of the bay is an islet surrounded by a flat of considerable extent. Klinkwan is a native village on the north shore of Hunter Bay at its entrance; it has a white church with two spires. Back of the village is a prominent conical mountain, 2,400 feet (730 m) high. Klakas Inlet joins Cordova Bay westward at the entrance to Hunter Bay.
