= Petersburg Creek–Duncan Salt Chuck Wilderness =

Wilderness area in Alaska, United States

Coordinates: 56°52′N 133°11′W

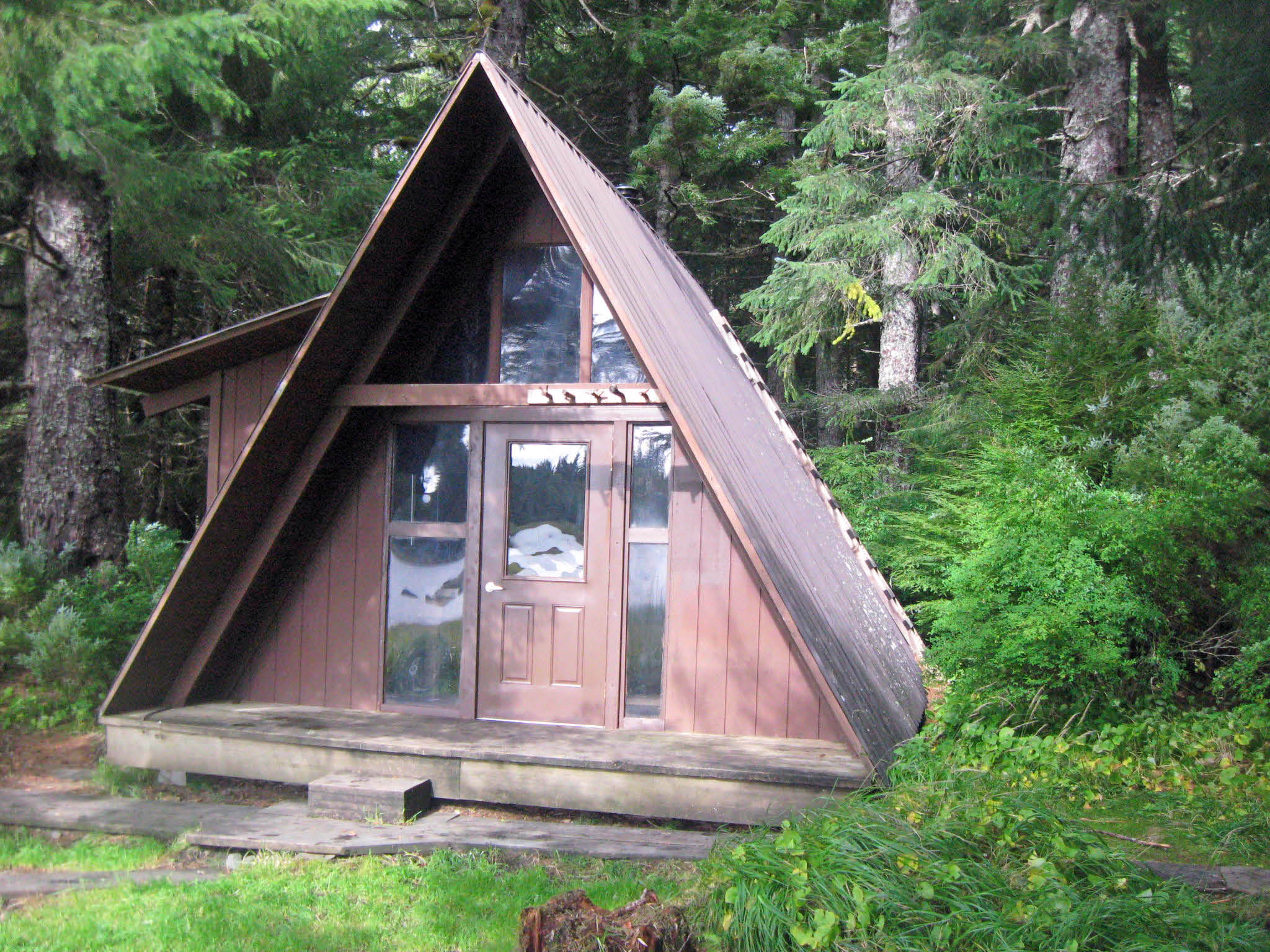
The Salt Chuck East Cabin in the Petersburg Creek–Duncan Salt Chuck Wilderness.

The Petersburg Creek–Duncan Salt Chuck Wilderness is a designated wilderness area located on Kupreanof Island, Alaska, within the Tongass National Forest. Created in 1980 by the Alaska National Interest Lands Conservation Act, the wilderness area protects 46,849 acres of temperate rainforests, salt marsheses and rugged, glacier-carved mountains.
