= KFSK =

Coordinates: 56.815°N 132.953°W

- Petersburg, Alaska; United States
- Broadcast area: Alaska Panhandle
- Frequency: 100.9 MHz (HD Radio)
- Branding: KFSK Radio

Programming
- Format: Public Radio

Ownership
- Owner: Narrows Broadcasting Corp.

Technical information
- Licensing authority: FCC
- Facility ID: 47409
- Class: A
- ERP: 2,000 watts
- HAAT: -147 meters

Links
- Public license information: Public file; LMS
- Webcast: Listen Live
- Website: KFSK website

KFSK is a non-commercial, Community Radio Station radio station in Petersburg, Alaska, broadcasting on 100.9 FM, and rebroadcasting over 4 translators. The station is owned by Narrows Broadcasting Corporation.The station Produces local news and broadcasts local content from Borough Assembly Meetings, School Board Meetings to High School Basketball Games and Community Cultural Events. KFSK provides programming from National Public Radio, The Alaska Public Radio Network, BBC World Service, and the Public Radio Exchange. KFSK hosts locally produced volunteer-hosted music programs and local call-in programs on issues of interest to the community. KFSK is supported by local businesses, organizations and local membership support.

== Low power translator stations ==
Broadcast translators for KFSK
| Call sign | Frequency | City of license | FID | ERP (W) | Class | FCC info |
|---|---|---|---|---|---|---|
| K276BD | 103.1 FM | Petersburg, Alaska | 47407 | 125 | D | LMS |
| K216AA | 91.1 FM | Point Baker, Alaska | 47411 | 140 | D | LMS |
| K201AL | 88.1 FM | Port Protection, Alaska | 47412 | 54 | D | LMS |
| K241AS | 96.1 FM | Whale Pass, Alaska | 152996 | 150 | D | LMS |
