= Mikhail Vasilyev (explorer) =

Russian explorer and vice admiral

Mikhail Nikolayevich Vasilyev (Russian: Михаил Николаевич Васильев; 1770 – June 23, 1847) was a Russian explorer and vice admiral of the Imperial Russian Navy. He is reputed for having surveyed the then little-known coast of Alaska as navigator. Vasiliev was sent by the Russian Imperial Hydrographic Service in 1819 to explore the northern parts of the Pacific Ocean and particularly the area around the Bering Strait. Certain geographic features of the Alaskan coast, like the Lindenberg Peninsula and Sealion Island were named by him in the maps that were subsequently published.

In 1820 Mikhail Vasiliev on the ship Otkrytie (Discovery) entered the Chukchi Sea and explored the coast of Alaska from Kotzebue Sound to Icy Cape and later from Norton Sound to Cape Newenham. He was accompanied by Gleb Semenovich Shishmarev (1781-1835), who was in command of the ship Blagonamerennyi (Good Intent). After these surveys, in which he is credited to be the first European having sighted Nunivak Island, Vasiliev sailed to Petropavlovsk and returned to Kronstadt, arriving there on August 2, 1822.

Vasiliev's name is spelt "Vasilief" in the United States, where Vasilief Bay in Atka and Cape Vasilyev in Nunivak Island were named after him by Captain Fyodor Petrovich Litke; Cape Vasilyev was later renamed "Cape Corwin" by the U.S. Board on Geographic Names in 1909. There are other geographic features in the coast of Alaska and the Aleutians bearing the name "Vasilief", but it is not clear after which Vasiliev they were named.
