= William Henry Bay =

- Bay
- Location in Alaska
- Coordinates: 58°43′3.72″N 135°14′21.84″W
- Country: United States
- State: Alaska
- Borough: Haines Borough
- Time zone: UTC-9 (Alaska (AKST))
  - Summer (DST): UTC-8 (AKDT)

William Henry Bay is a waterway in the U.S. state of Alaska. It is located near Haines in the Alexander Archipelago. The only commercial copper deposit in Southeast Alaska situated north of Prince of Wales Island was located in the bay. Significant gold and strategic mineral anomalies were found at William Henry Bay during surveys in 2011.

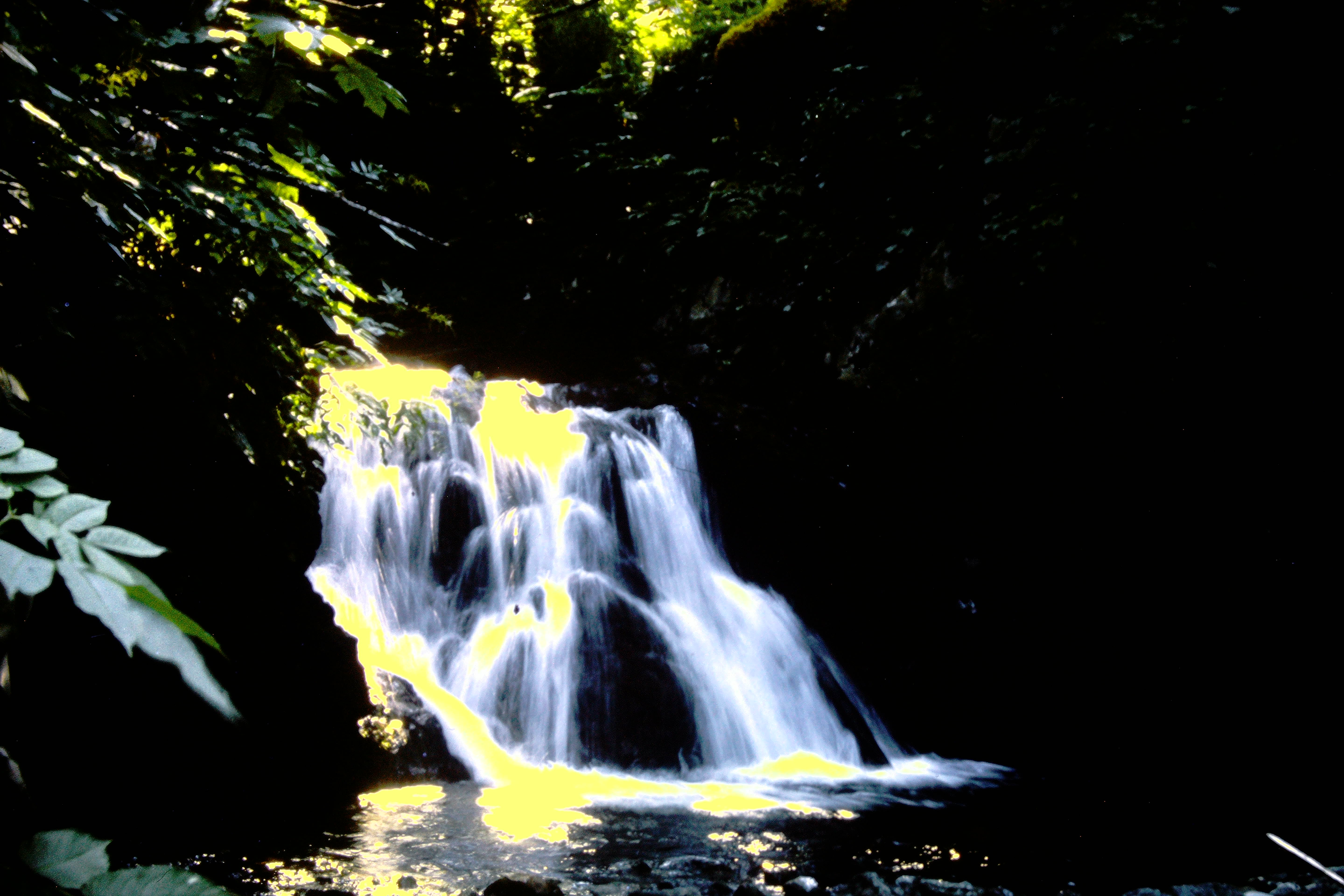
The lower waterfall on the Beardslee River upstream from William Henry Bay on 1 August 1966

== Geography ==
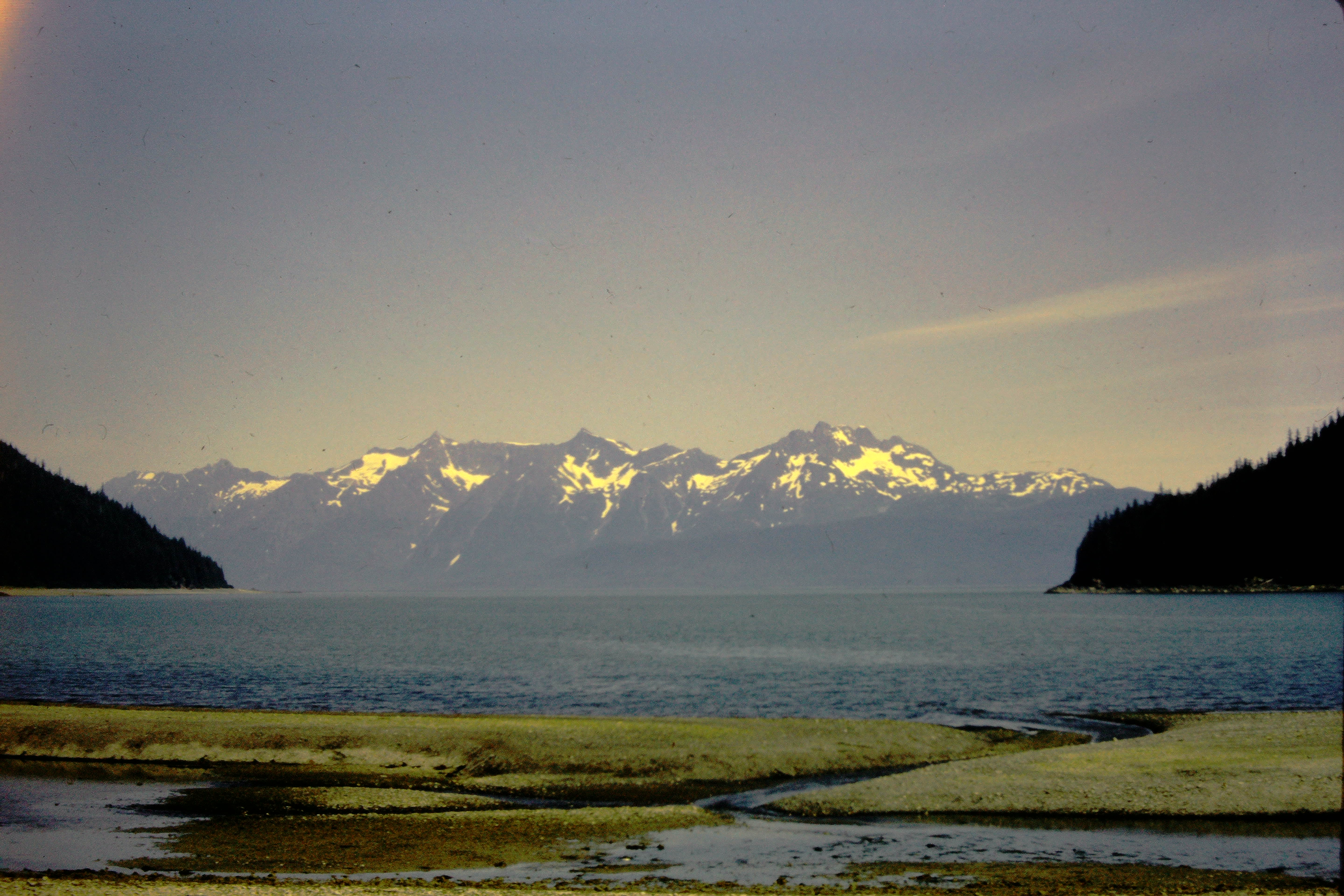
Looking north from the shore of William Henry Bay toward the Lynn Canal on 1 September 1966

The bay is situated 45 miles (72 km) northwest of Juneau on the western portion of the Lynn Canal. It is about 0.75 miles (0.65 nmi; 1.21 km) long and about 4 cables — i.e., about 960 yards (880 m) — in width. The Beardslee River flows down a few cascades into its head. About 4 miles (6.4 km) northwest of the bay is the Endicott River, coming in from the west through a narrow, deep gorge in the mountains.

== History ==
After the United States Government purchased Alaska from the Russian Empire in 1867, United States Navy Commander Richard Worsam Meade made the first effort to identify the timber trade route from Lynn Canal to Haines via William Henry Bay in 1869. Meade adopted the bay's name from the Hudson Bay traders. In 1880 U.S. Navy Commander Lester A. Beardslee who came to the bay and purchased corded firewood. Detailed hydrographic surveys and marine charts were prepared. Farmers came to the bay area, and grew strawberries and rutabagas. Though telecommunication cables of the Alaska Communications System existed at the bay until the late 1950s, they are not reflected in the latest maps of the bay area.

Mining

After copper claims were discovered about 1 mile (1.6 km) south-southwest of the head of the bay, the Alaska Endicott Mining and Milling Company was established and began copper mining. In 1921, gold tracer mining was also initiated. During this period, the copper mining operations were not profitable and as a result, the mines were closed and the gold tracer studies were also discontinued. At the initiative of the U.S. Government, in the 1950s, many prospectors tried to locate uranium in the area – what became known as the "uranium rush". This was based on the airborne surveys, which revealed radiation about 2 miles (3.2 km) northwest of the bay at an elevation of about 1,800 feet (550 m). Noranda Exploration, Inc. and Nippon Mining commenced core drilling operations in the 1950s, but failed to establish a viable source worthy of economic development. Efforts made in 1985 by Dale Henkins, who had nine continuous federal claims named the "Lucky Six uranium prospect," proved to be unprofitable. During 2011, prospecting for gold and strategic mineral anomalies were pursued by Alaska state geologists, and findings of gold and strategic mineral anomalies (including rare-earth elements) were reported in William Henry Bay.

== See also ==
- Copper mining in the United States
- Lists of copper mines in the United States
