= Wrangell Narrows =

Channel between Mitkof Island and Kupreanof Island, Alaska

Coordinates: 56°38′05″N 132°56′28″W

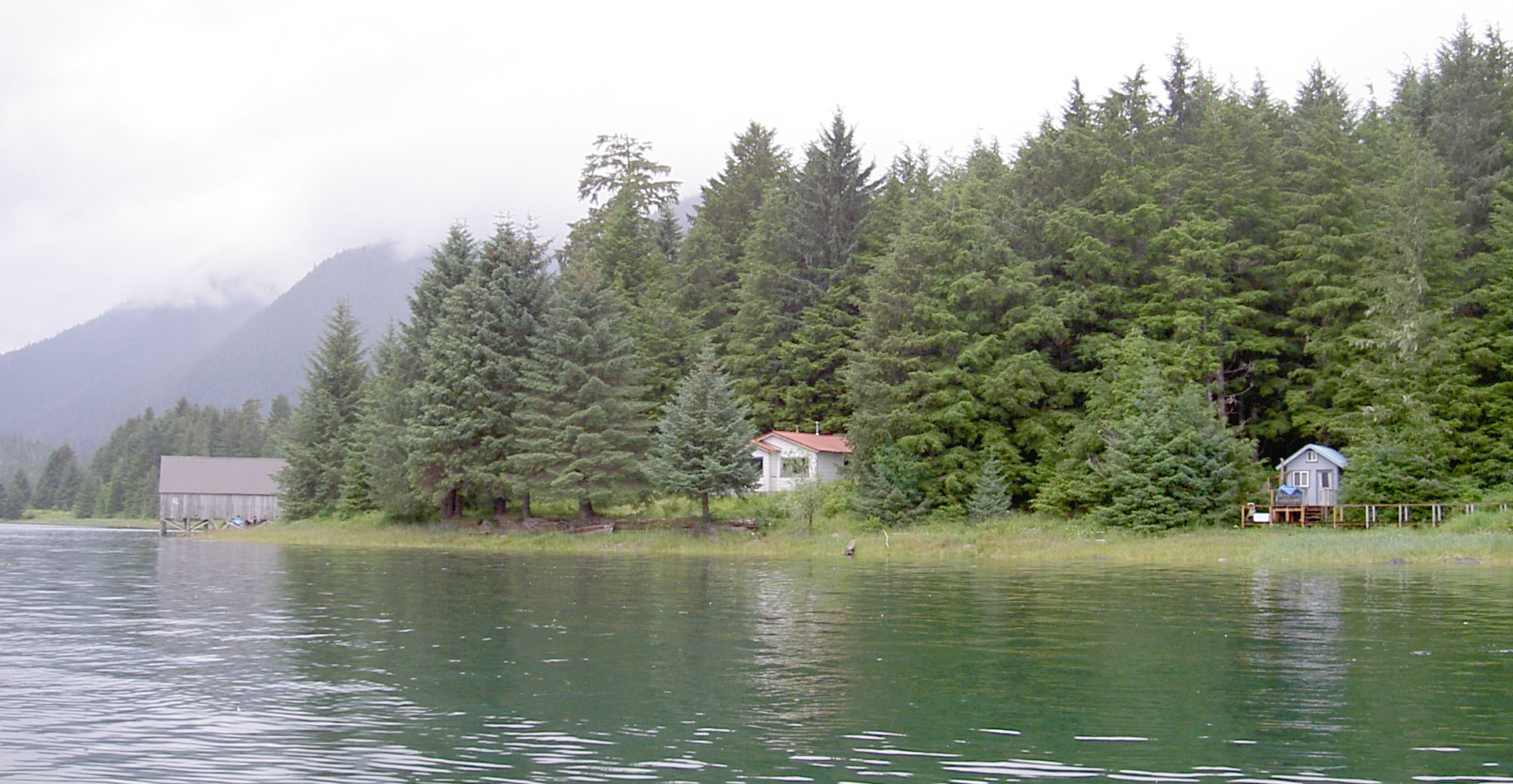
The north shore of the Narrows in 2011

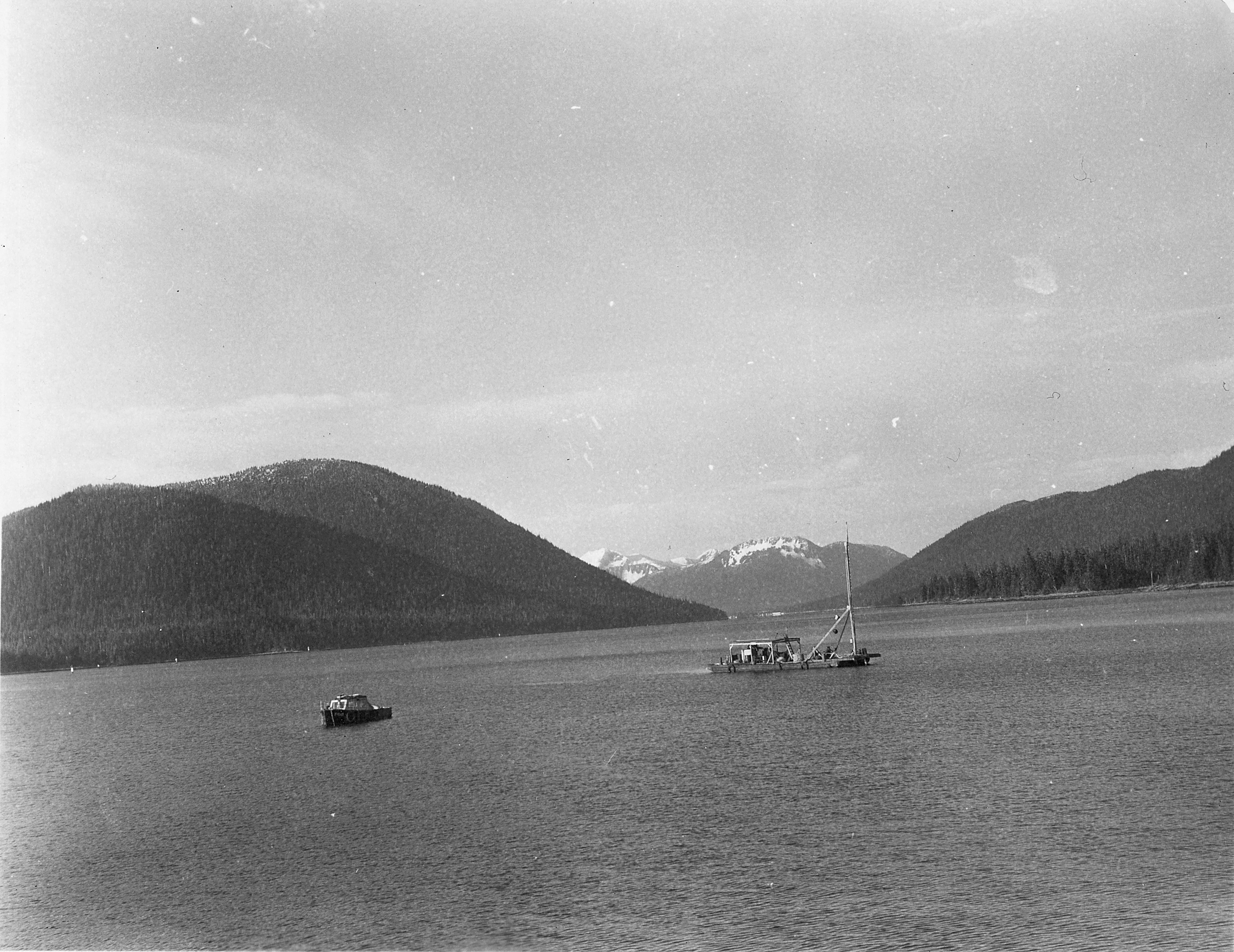
The Narrows in 1948

The Wrangell Narrows is a winding, 35-kilometre-long (22 mi) channel between Mitkof Island and Kupreanof Island in the Alexander Archipelago in Southeast Alaska. The Wrangell Narrows is one of the six Listed narrows in Southeast Alaska. There are about 60 lights and buoys to mark it because of its winding nature and navigation hazards. It was named "Proliv Vrangelya" (English: Wrangell Strait) in 1838 by G. Lindenberg after Admiral Baron Ferdinand Petrovich von Wrangell. The translation Wrangell Strait remained in use while Wrangell Narrows referred to the narrowest central portion. By 1919 Department of Commerce nautical chart 8170 was changed from Wrangell Strait to Wrangell Narrows.

Dakxhatgwak Séet is the original Tlingit name of Wrangell Narrows. Later it was called Gantee Yaak’w Séet (Steamboat Channel) referring to it having become a passage for steamers.

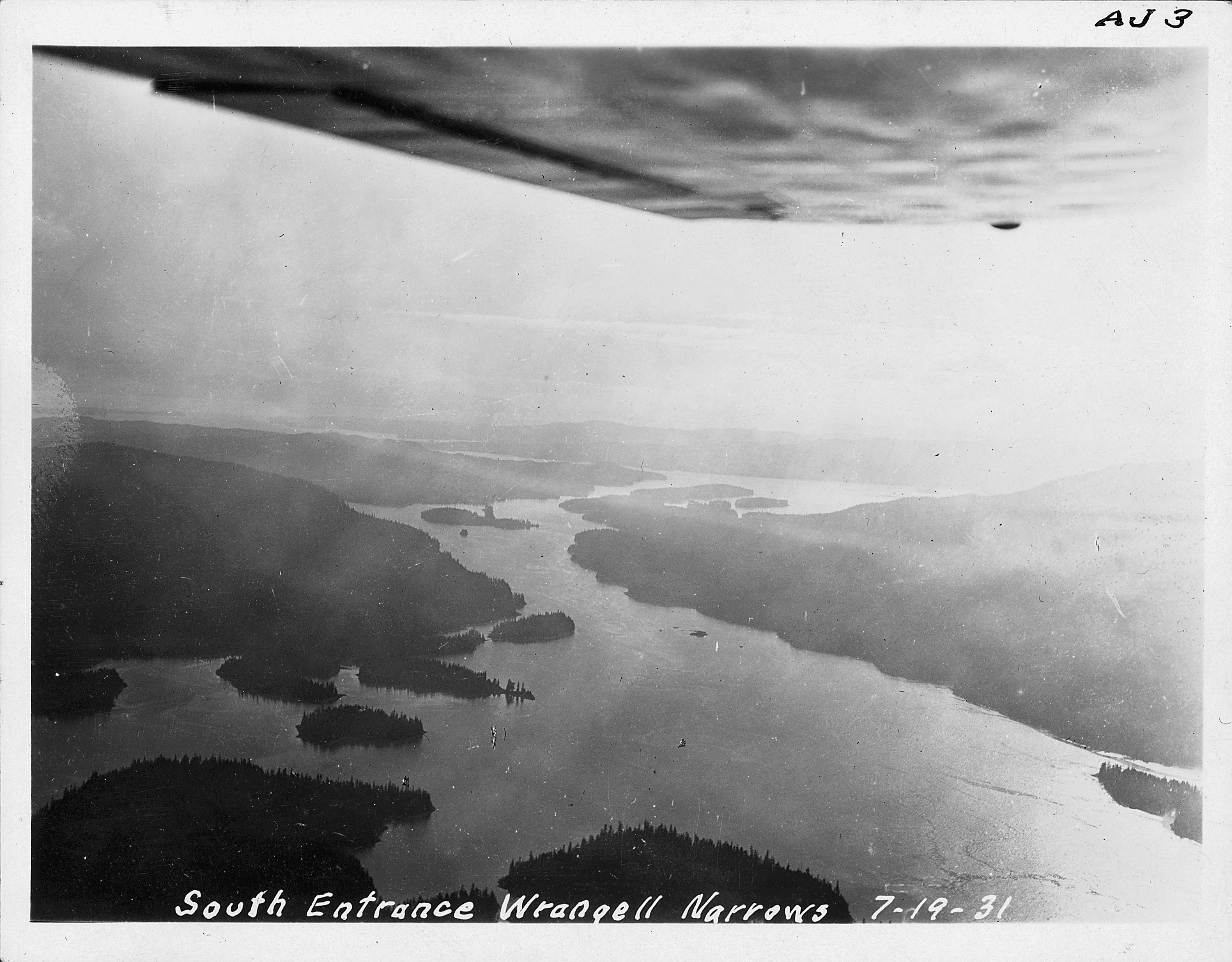
Aerial view (erroneously or archaically) labelled as showing the south entrance to Wrangell Narrows, July 1931. Taken over Wrangell Narrows north of Blind Slough looking southwest toward Duncan Canal which connects to Wrangell Narrows at Beecher Pass above center of view. Anchor Point has scraggy trees just below Spruce Point at center of photo.

The town of Petersburg is at the north end of the Narrows. The Narrows are created by Mitkof Island to the east and southeast, and the islands of Kuprenof and Woewodski to the north and west. The Narrows opens up to Frederick Sound to the north and Sumner Strait to the south.

The channel is used by fishing boats and Alaska Marine Highway ferries. Very large ships (such as the largest cruise ships) do not use it because it is too shallow and narrow for them to pass safely. Because this is the only safe "Inside Passage" at this latitude, these larger ships must navigate in "outside" waters. Dry Strait to the east of Mitkof Island is not commonly used by marine traffic despite being a wider channel since it is dangerously shallow and part of the greater Stikine River estuary.
