= Petersburg, Alaska =

City in Alaska

Petersburg, Alaska Gántiyaakw Séedi
- CDP
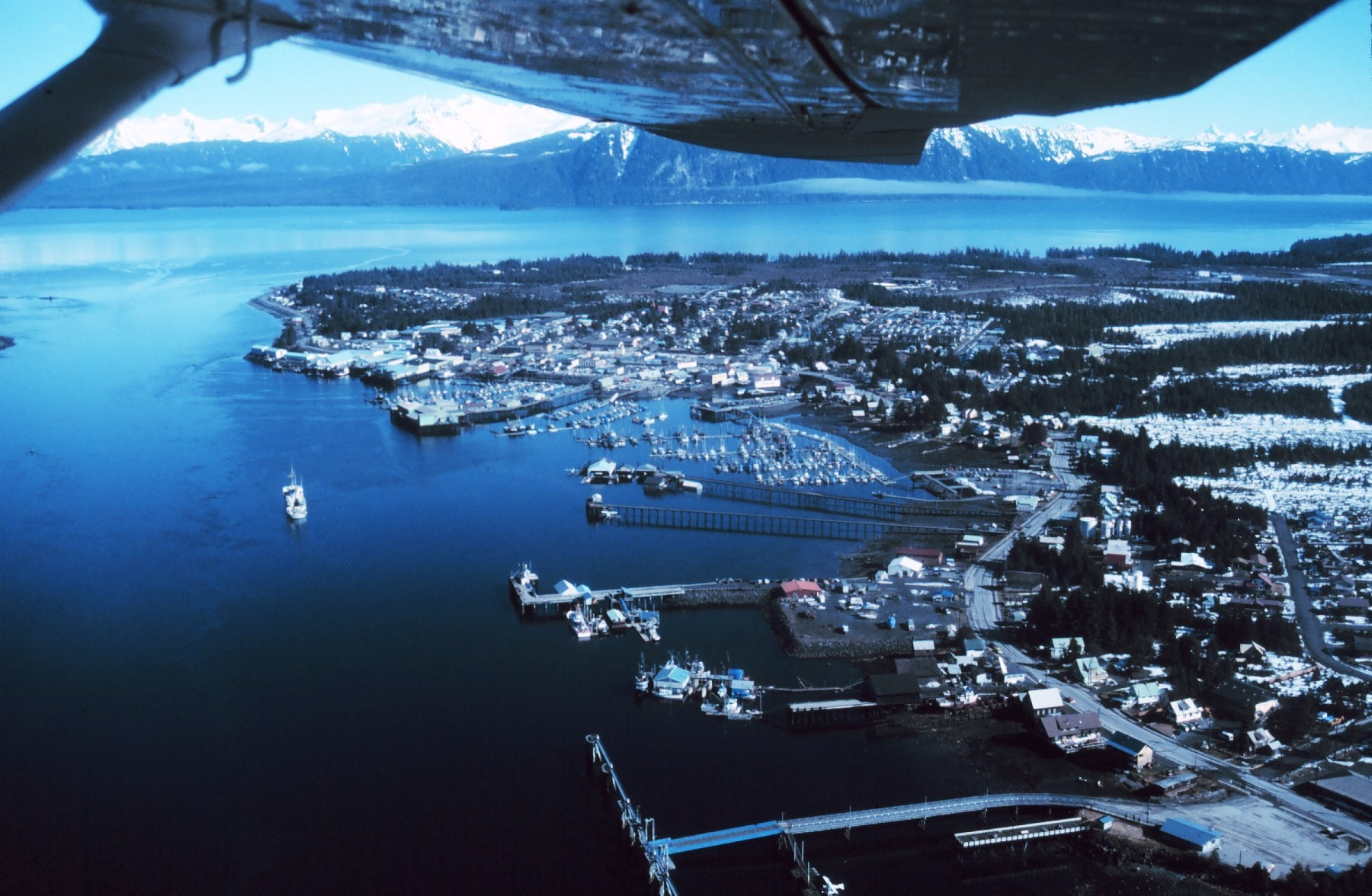
- Aerial view of Petersburg
- Motto: Little Norway. Big Adventure.
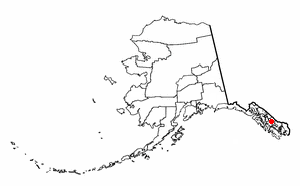
- Location of Petersburg in Alaska
- Coordinates: 56°48′16″N 132°56′31″W
- Country: United States
- State: Alaska
- Borough: Petersburg

Area
  - Total: 46.31 sq mi (119.93 km^{2})
  - Land: 44.17 sq mi (114.40 km^{2})
  - Water: 2.14 sq mi (5.53 km^{2})

Population (2020)
  - Total: 3,043
  - Density: 69/sq mi (26.6/km^{2})
- ZIP code: 99833
- Area code: 907
- FIPS code: 02-60310

Petersburg (Tlingit: Gántiyaakw Séedi) is a census-designated place (CDP) in and essentially the borough seat of Petersburg Borough, Alaska, United States. The population was 3,043 at the 2020 census, up from 2,948 in 2010. The town is the headquarters of the Petersburg Indian Association, a federally recognized tribe of Tlingit people.

The borough encompasses Petersburg and Kupreanof, plus mostly uninhabited areas stretching to the Canadian–American border and the southern boundary of the City and Borough of Juneau. While the city of Petersburg ceased to exist as a separate administrative entity (the borough assembly created a service area to assume operation of the former city's services), the tiny city of Kupreanof remains separate within the borough.

== History ==
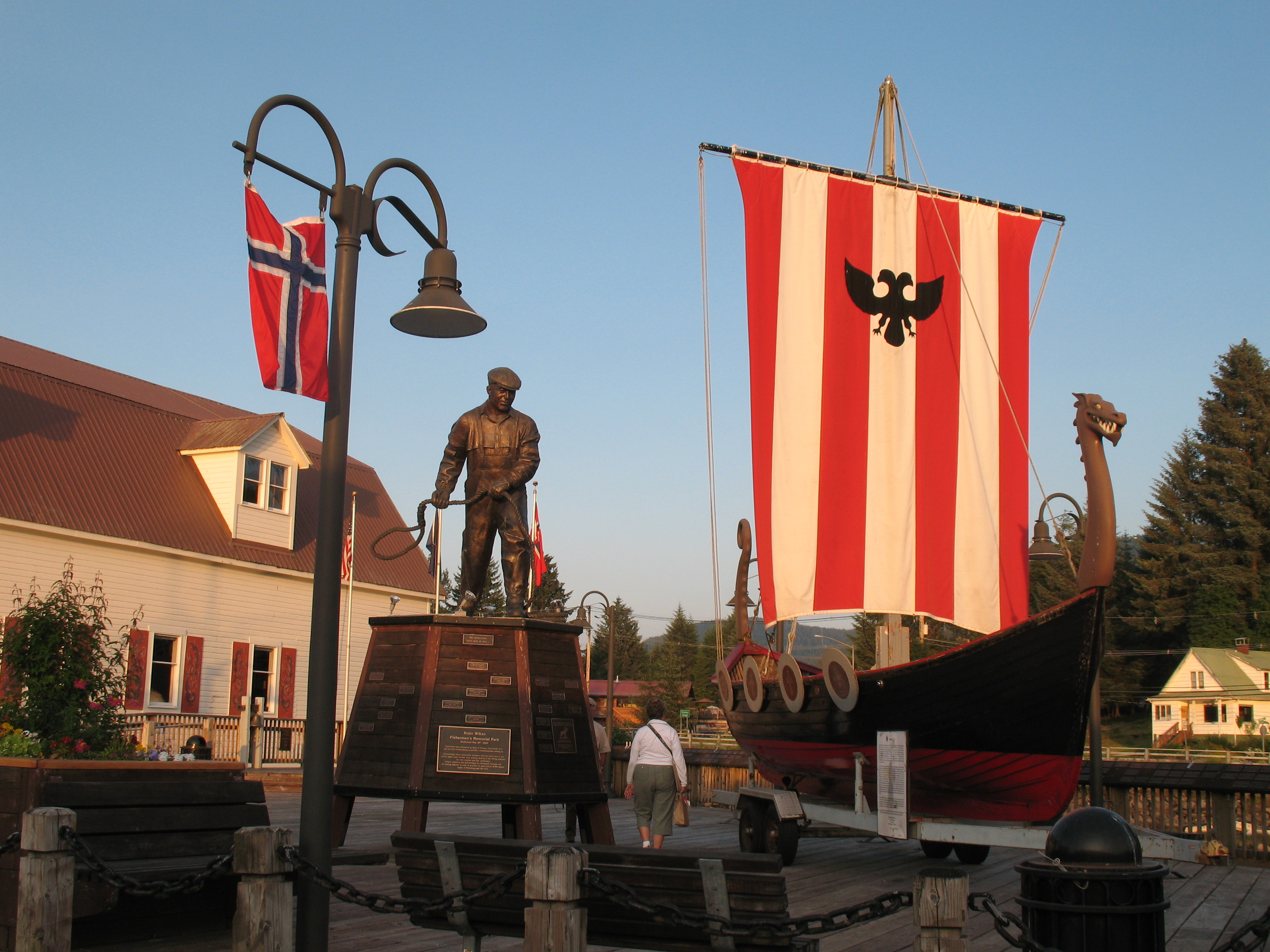
Founded by the Norwegian immigrant Peter Buschmann, Petersburg is known for its strong Norwegian traditions and nicknamed "Little Norway".

Tlingits from Kupreanof Island had long used a summer fish camp at the north end of Mitkof Island. Earlier cultures of Indigenous people also used the island: remnants of fish traps and some petroglyphs have been carbon-dated back some 10,000 years. Shell middens have been dated to 1,200 years ago.

European explorers to Mitkof Island encountered the Tlingit. In the 19th century, Peter Buschmann, a Norwegian immigrant, settled here, building a cannery, sawmill, docks and early structures. The settlement was named Petersburg after him, and it flourished as a fishing port. Icebergs from the nearby LeConte Glacier provided a source for cooling fish.

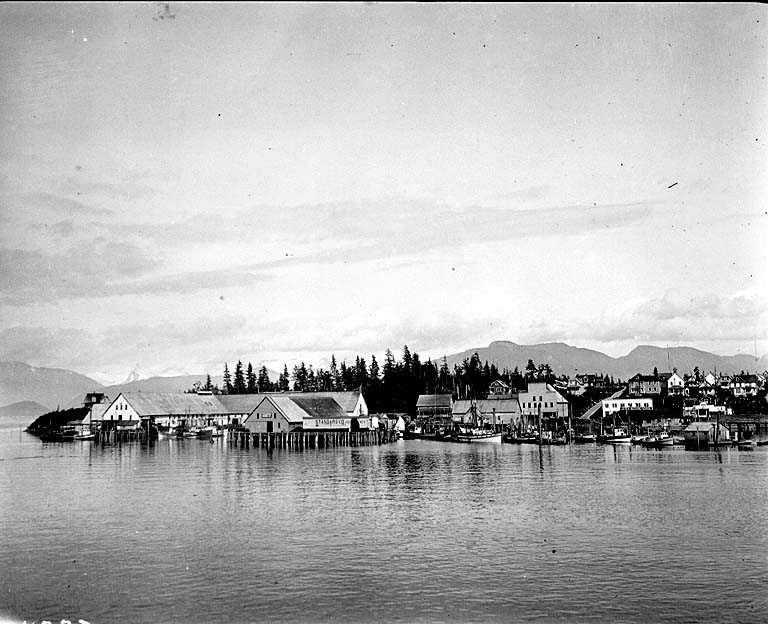
View of Petersburg from the water, August 1918, by John Nathan Cobb

Petersburg originally incorporated as a town on April 2, 1910. The town had attracted mostly immigrants of Scandinavian origin, giving Petersburg the nickname "Little Norway". The Sons of Norway hall was built on one of the piers. Three other canneries were built and the four have operated continuously since. With the establishment of the cannery, Alaskan Natives, including Chief John Lott, began to work there and live year-round at the site.

The 1939 Slattery Report on Alaskan development identified the region as one of the areas where new settlements would be established through Jewish immigration. This plan was never implemented.

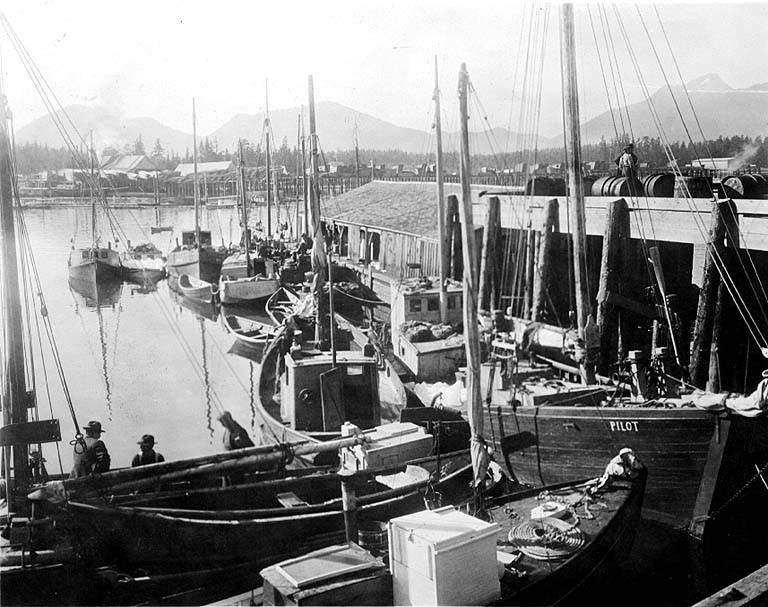
Fishing boats in the harbor at Petersburg

Fisheries were the mainstay of the economy. In 1965, Petersburg fishermen founded Icicle Seafoods. Fishermen Gordon Jensen and Magnus Martens teamed up with managers Tom Thompson and Bob Thorstenson, Sr. to organize a group of fishermen to purchase the Pacific American Fisheries (PAF) plant (the original Buschmann cannery) at a time when the seafood industry seemed in decline. PAF was traded on the NYSE and had been one of the largest processors in Alaska for a half century. The shareholders, including Board members Fred File, Fred Haltiner, Jr., Robin Leekley, Jeff Pfundt, Aril Mathisen, Bud Samuelson and many others (Hofstads, Otness, and Petersons to name a few) began their work to create, improve and institute the fisheries that sustain Petersburg and many other coastal communities in Alaska today. The company was originally known as PFI but in 1977 changed its name officially to Icicle Seafoods.

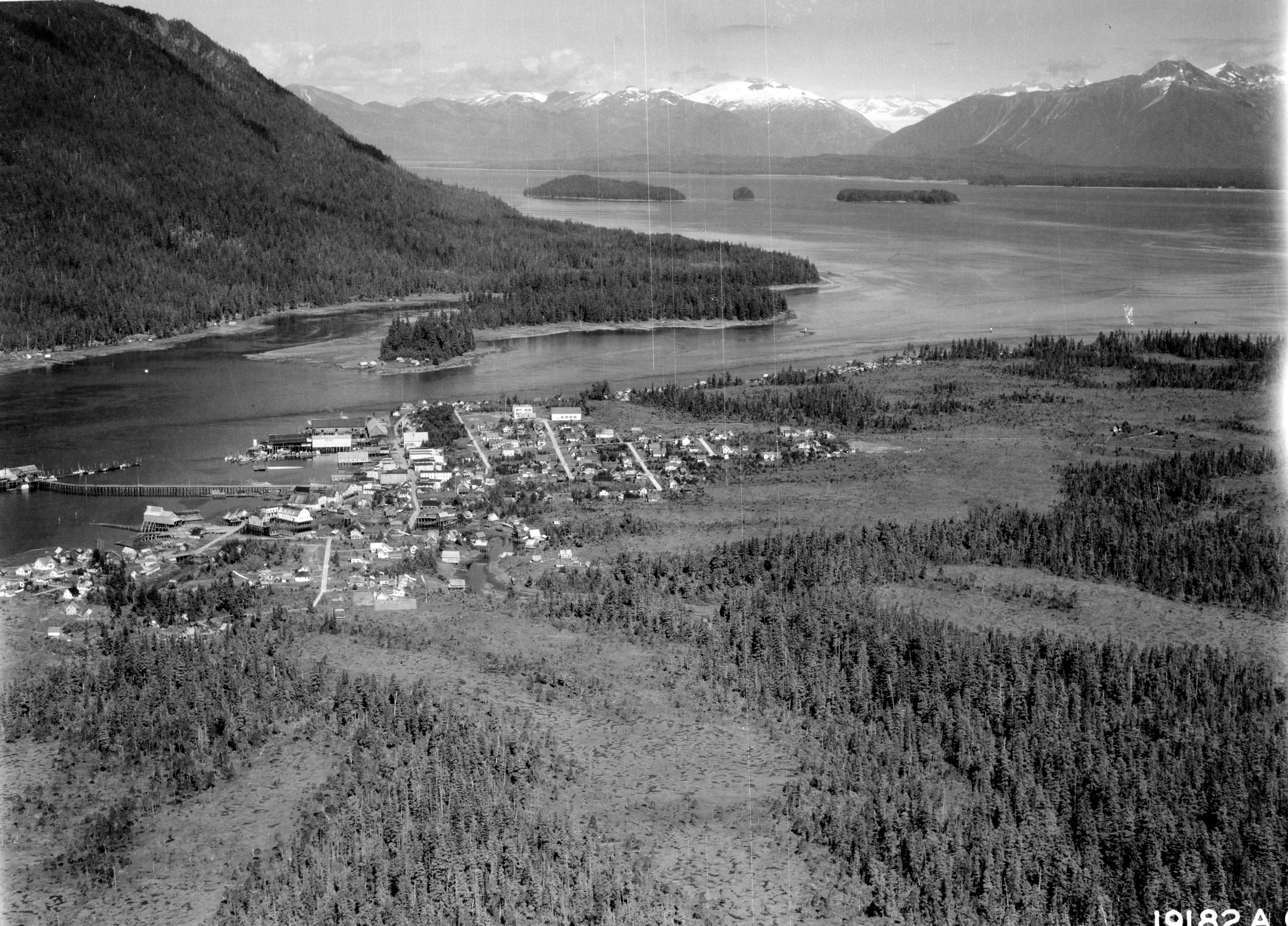
Petersburg in the 1940s

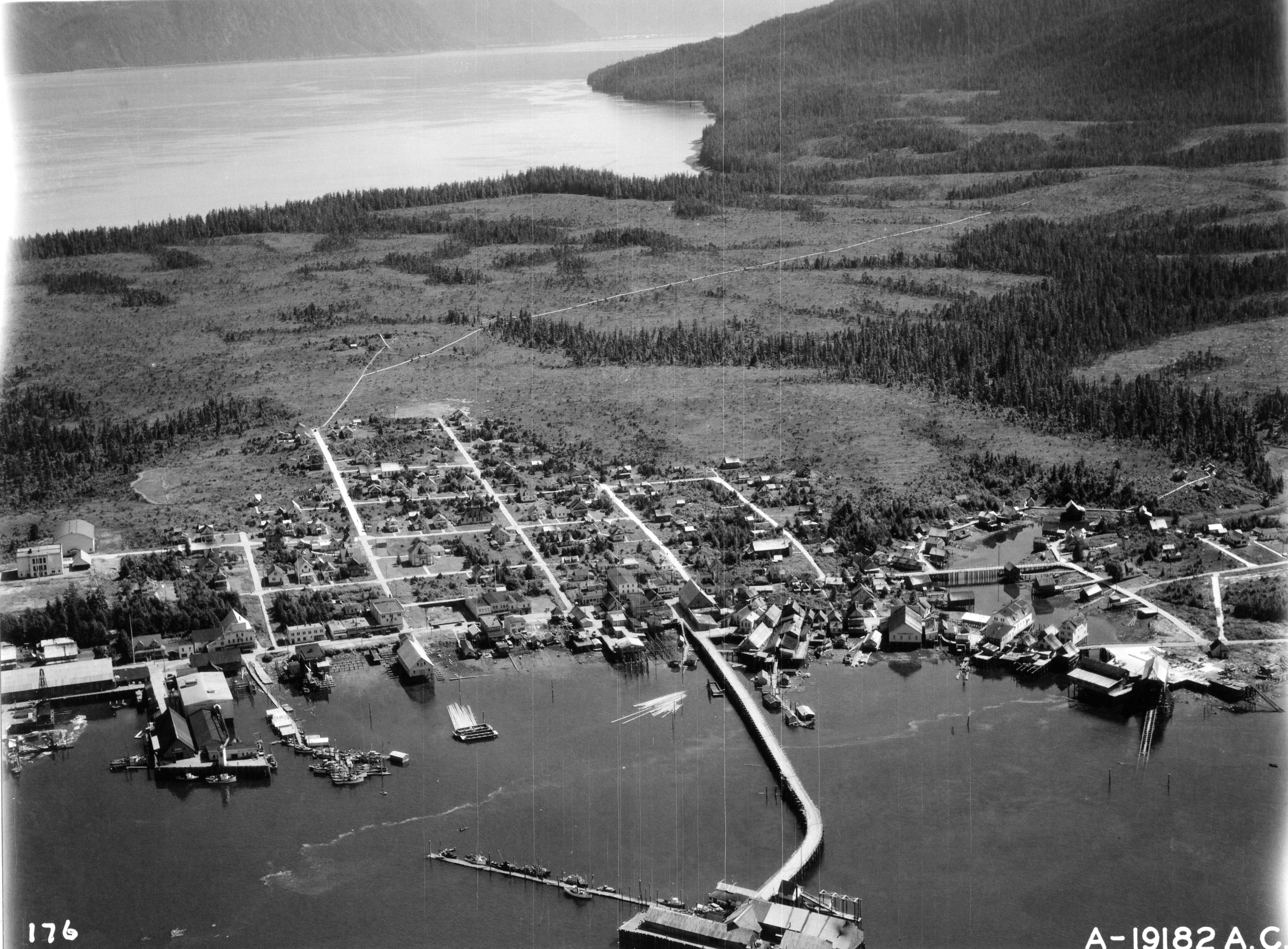
Petersburg in the 1940s

Petersburg incorporated as a borough in January 2013, encompassing Petersburg and Kupreanof, plus mostly uninhabited areas stretching to the Canada–US border and the southern boundary of the City and Borough of Juneau. While the City of Petersburg ceased to exist as a separate entity (the borough assembly created a service area to assume operation of the former city's services), the tiny city of Kupreanof remains separate within the borough.

== Geography ==
Petersburg is on the north end of Mitkof Island, where the Wrangell Narrows meets Frederick Sound. Petersburg is halfway between Juneau, 190 km (120 mi) to the north, and Ketchikan, 180 km (110 mi) to the south.

According to the United States Census Bureau, the city has an area of 46.0 square miles (119 km^{2}), of which 43.9 square miles (114 km^{2}) is land and 2.2 square miles (5.7 km^{2}) (4.74%) is water.

Mitkof Island is largely covered by low mountains. The lowlands are mainly made up of muskeg, a type of soil made up of plants in various states of decomposition. It is about 20 miles from its north end to its south. The island's western side borders the Wrangell Narrows, one of the six listed in Southeast Alaska. The Narrows provides a somewhat protected waterway for boats, and opens on the south end of the island into Sumner Straits. Mitkof Island has many creeks that empty into the Narrows, including Blind Slough, Falls Creek, Twin Creeks, and Spirit Creek.

According to the National Marine Fisheries Service, the town is the 15th-most lucrative fisheries port in the United States by volume. In 2011, 101 million pounds of fish and shellfish passed through Petersburg, with a dockside value of $65 million. That year Petersburg ranked as 13th in the nation in terms of the value of its catches.

=== Climate ===
The climate of Petersburg is oceanic (Cfb) under the −3 °C (27 °F) isotherm or humid continental (Dfb) under the 0 °C (32 °F) isotherm, closely bordering a subpolar oceanic climate (Cfc) and subarctic climate (Dfc). On January 16, 1981, Petersburg registered a daily maximum temperature of 62 °F (17 °C), the highest ever recorded in the month of January in Alaska. On February 27, 1992, a high of 66 °F (19 °C) was observed, also setting a monthly state record high.

Climate data for Petersburg, Alaska (1991–2020 normals, extremes 1926–present)
Month	Jan	Feb	Mar	Apr	May	Jun	Jul	Aug	Sep	Oct	Nov	Dec	Year
Record high °F (°C)	65 (18)	66 (19)	66 (19)	73 (23)	79 (26)	83 (28)	84 (29)	83 (28)	81 (27)	72 (22)	64 (18)	59 (15)	84 (29)
Mean maximum °F (°C)	49.8 (9.9)	49.2 (9.6)	51.8 (11.0)	60.1 (15.6)	69.8 (21.0)	73.8 (23.2)	74.1 (23.4)	73.6 (23.1)	66.3 (19.1)	59.3 (15.2)	50.8 (10.4)	48.2 (9.0)	77.4 (25.2)
Mean daily maximum °F (°C)	34.6 (1.4)	36.7 (2.6)	40.3 (4.6)	47.8 (8.8)	55.3 (12.9)	59.9 (15.5)	61.7 (16.5)	61.2 (16.2)	55.7 (13.2)	47.4 (8.6)	39.3 (4.1)	35.3 (1.8)	47.9 (8.8)
Daily mean °F (°C)	30.9 (−0.6)	32.1 (0.1)	34.9 (1.6)	41.4 (5.2)	48.5 (9.2)	54.0 (12.2)	56.3 (13.5)	55.8 (13.2)	50.8 (10.4)	43.3 (6.3)	35.8 (2.1)	31.8 (−0.1)	43.0 (6.1)
Mean daily minimum °F (°C)	27.2 (−2.7)	27.5 (−2.5)	29.6 (−1.3)	35.1 (1.7)	41.7 (5.4)	48.1 (8.9)	51.0 (10.6)	50.3 (10.2)	45.8 (7.7)	39.2 (4.0)	32.3 (0.2)	28.4 (−2.0)	38.0 (3.3)
Mean minimum °F (°C)	8.6 (−13.0)	11.8 (−11.2)	15.0 (−9.4)	25.3 (−3.7)	32.6 (0.3)	39.9 (4.4)	44.6 (7.0)	42.5 (5.8)	35.1 (1.7)	27.2 (−2.7)	18.2 (−7.7)	12.5 (−10.8)	2.9 (−16.2)
Record low °F (°C)	−19 (−28)	−15 (−26)	−6 (−21)	10 (−12)	21 (−6)	29 (−2)	37 (3)	32 (0)	22 (−6)	12 (−11)	−8 (−22)	−10 (−23)	−19 (−28)
Average precipitation inches (mm)	11.39 (289)	7.60 (193)	7.60 (193)	6.66 (169)	5.86 (149)	4.98 (126)	5.63 (143)	8.21 (209)	14.35 (364)	13.84 (352)	12.28 (312)	11.79 (299)	110.19 (2,799)
Average snowfall inches (cm)	20.7 (53)	16.9 (43)	20.0 (51)	1.1 (2.8)	0.2 (0.51)	0.0 (0.0)	0.0 (0.0)	0.0 (0.0)	0.0 (0.0)	0.4 (1.0)	10.8 (27)	15.5 (39)	85.6 (217)
Average extreme snow depth inches (cm)	12.0 (30)	11.4 (29)	8.8 (22)	1.1 (2.8)	0.0 (0.0)	0.0 (0.0)	0.0 (0.0)	0.0 (0.0)	0.0 (0.0)	0.3 (0.76)	5.2 (13)	10.1 (26)	18.5 (47)
Average precipitation days (≥ 0.01 in)	21.2	17.4	19.5	18.1	15.8	16.4	16.7	17.1	20.3	22.6	22.9	21.3	229.3
Average snowy days	7.1	7.0	7.3	1.0	0.1	0.0	0.0	0.0	0.0	0.3	4.9	8.2	35.9
Source: NOAA

== Demographics ==
Historical population
Census	Pop.	Note	%±
1910	585		—
1920	879		50.3%
1930	1,252		42.4%
1940	1,323		5.7%
1950	1,619		22.4%
1960	1,502		−7.2%
1970	2,042		36.0%
1980	2,821		38.1%
1990	3,207		13.7%
2000	3,224		0.5%
2010	2,948		−8.6%
2020	3,043		3.2%

=== Racial and ethnic composition ===
Petersburg CDP, Alaska – Racial composition Note: the US Census treats Hispanic/Latino as an ethnic category. This table excludes Latinos from the racial categories and assigns them to a separate category. Hispanics/Latinos may be of any race.
Race (NH = Non-Hispanic)	% 2020	% 2010	% 2000	Pop 2020	Pop 2010	Pop 2000
White alone (NH)	70.9%	78.2%	80.9%	2,159	2,306	2,608
Black alone (NH)	1.4%	0.4%	0.3%	43	13	10
American Indian alone (NH)	7%	6.8%	7%	213	201	225
Asian alone (NH)	3.7%	3.1%	2.7%	112	91	88
Pacific Islander alone (NH)	0.4%	0.2%	0.1%	12	5	4
Other race alone (NH)	0.4%	0.2%	0.3%	12	6	11
Multiracial (NH)	11.2%	7.4%	5.8%	341	217	186
Hispanic/Latino (any race)	5%	3.7%	2.9%	151	109	92

=== 2020 census ===
As of the 2020 census, Petersburg had a population of 3,043. The median age was 42.0 years. 20.4% of residents were under the age of 18 and 20.7% were 65 years of age or older. For every 100 females there were 110.0 males, and for every 100 females age 18 and over there were 113.1 males.

0.0% of residents lived in urban areas, while 100.0% lived in rural areas.

There were 1,233 households, of which 30.7% had children under the age of 18 living in them. Of all households, 48.3% were married-couple households, 21.4% were households with a male householder and no spouse or partner present, and 21.6% were households with a female householder and no spouse or partner present. About 28.0% of all households were made up of individuals and 12.8% had someone living alone who was 65 years of age or older.

There were 1,371 housing units, of which 10.1% were vacant. The homeowner vacancy rate was 1.6% and the rental vacancy rate was 8.1%.

The most reported detailed ancestries in 2020 were:

- English (15.8%)
- German (15.7%)
- Norwegian (13.8%)
- Irish (12.9%)
- Tlingit (7.1%)
- Scottish (4.7%)
- Swedish (3.7%)
- Filipino (3.1%)
- French (2.9%)
- Scandinavian (2.8%)

Petersburg first appeared on the 1910 U.S. census and incorporated that same year. In 2013, upon the creation of the Borough of Petersburg, it became a census-designated place (CDP).

=== 2000 census ===
As of the census of 2000, there were 3,224 people, 1,240 households, and 849 families residing in the city. The population density was 73.5 inhabitants per square mile (28.4/km^{2}). There were 1,367 housing units at an average density of 31.2 per square mile (12.0/km^{2}). The racial makeup of the city was 81.64% White, 0.31% Black or African American, 7.20% Native American or Alaska Native, 2.76% Asian, 0.19% Pacific Islander, 1.86% from other races, and 6.05% from two or more races. Hispanic or Latino of any race were 2.85% of the population.

There were 1,240 households, out of which 38.4% had children under the age of 18 living with them, 54.2% were married couples living together, 9.3% had a female householder with no husband present, and 31.5% were non-families. 25.5% of all households were made up of individuals, and 6.6% had someone living alone who was 65 years of age or older. The average household size was 2.56 and the average family size was 3.11.

In the city the population was spread out, with 29.8% under the age of 18, 6.2% from 18 to 24, 30.6% from 25 to 44, 24.6% from 45 to 64, and 8.8% who were 65 years of age or older. The median age was 36 years. For every 100 females, there were 108.7 males. For every 100 females age 18 and over, there were 108.0 males.

The median income for a household in the city was $49,028, and the median income for a family was $54,934. Males had a median income of $42,135 versus $28,792 for females. The per capita income for the city was $25,827. About 3.3% of families and 5.0% of the population were below the poverty line, including 3.5% of those under age 18 and 4.2% of those age 65 or over.

== Economy ==
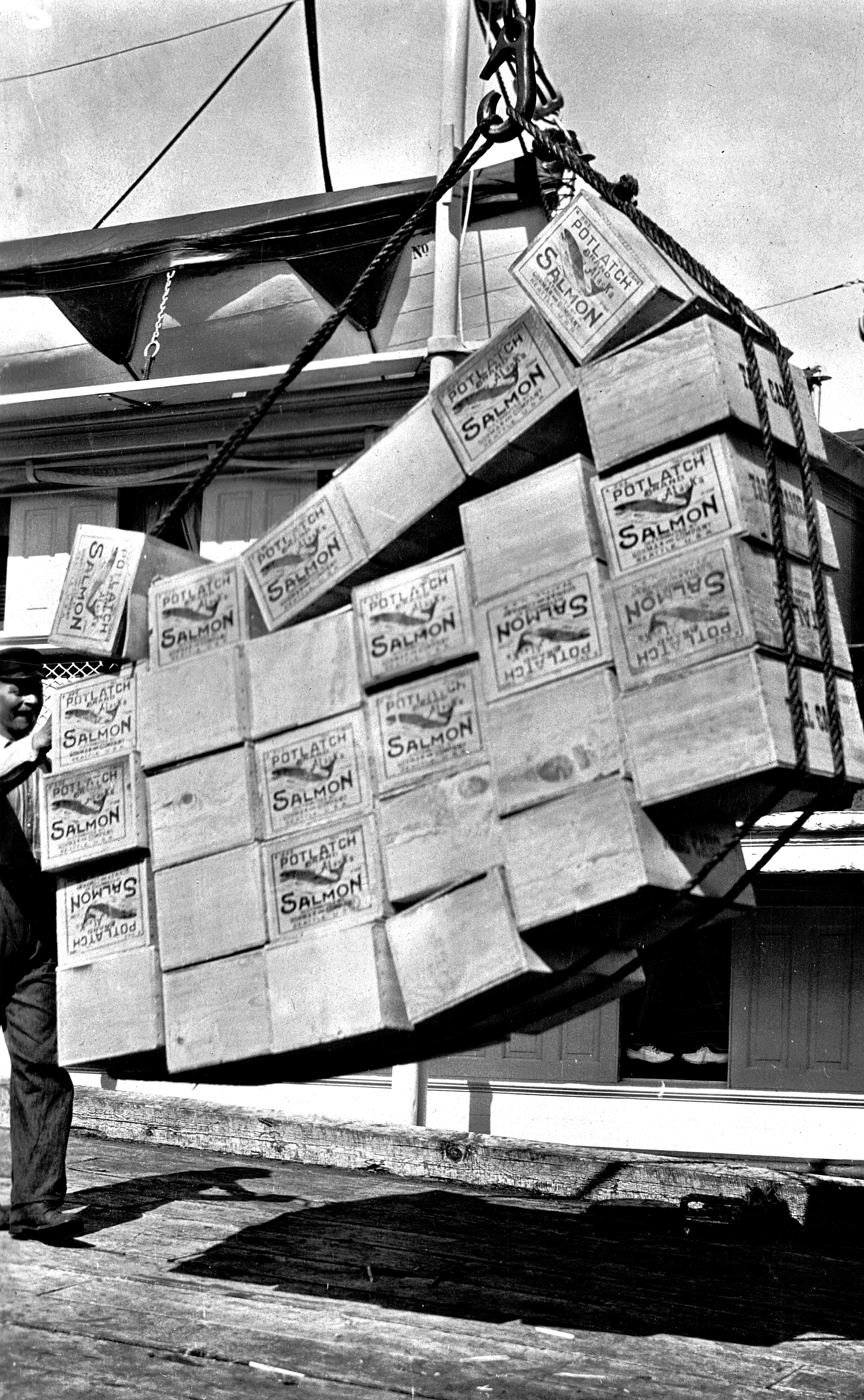
Loading boxes of salmon in Petersburg in 1915.

=== Commercial fishing ===
For a brief time during a peak period of the commercial fishing industry, Petersburg was rumored to have the highest per-capita income for a working town in the U.S.

Commercial fishing is the dominant economic driver of Petersburg's economy. The top producers harvest well over a million dollars of seafood each and every year. While there is a vibrant salmon troll and gillnet fleet, as well as participants in the dungeness crab and dive fisheries, the main producers in Petersburg are the 58-foot limit 'seiners'. These 58-footers harvest salmon, halibut, black cod, king, tanner crab, and herring. Many of them travel west to trawl, longline and pot cod in the western Gulf of Alaska and the Bering Sea.

Currently featured in the worldwide salmon markets, the 58-foot fleet now boasts crew jobs that can approach six figures. The sustainability of all commercially harvested resources has been a trademark of the fisheries participated in by Petersburg fishermen. Petersburg Vessel Owners Association, resurrected by Gordon Jensen in the 1980s, is the lead association that ensures that all seafood harvested by the Petersburg fleet is done so in a sustainable manner, consistent with the conservation principles embodied in the state of Alaska constitution.

Petersburg also maintains a large contingent of Bristol Bay fishermen. Over 75 Petersburg residents travel each summer to fish commercially on around 35 Bristol Bay vessels in Naknek, Dillingham and King Salmon.

=== Tourism ===
Small cruise ships (up to 250 passengers) and private yachts visit from May through September.

== Arts and culture ==
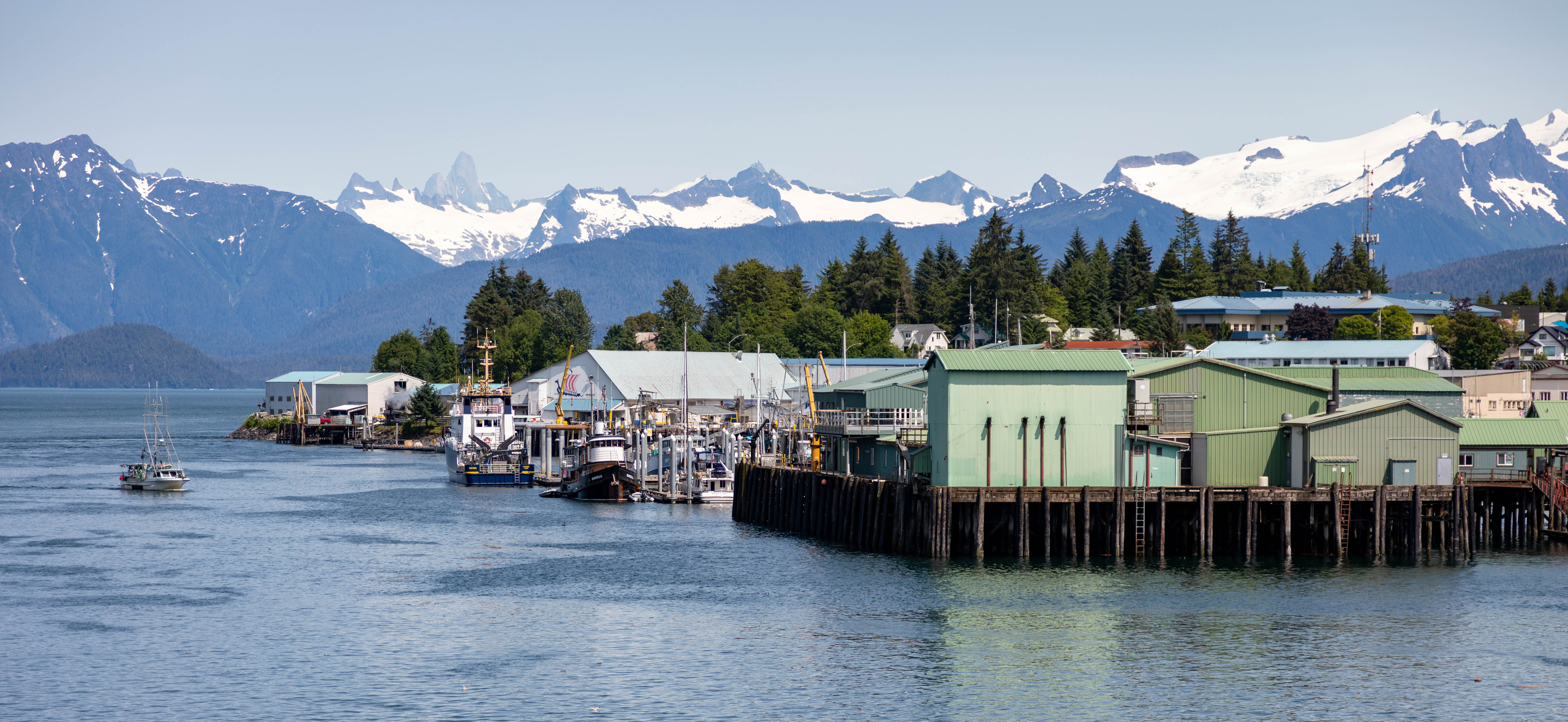
Petersburg waterfront

- Petersburg celebrates Norwegian Constitution Day on the third weekend of May, in a celebration called "Mayfest". Generally four days of festivities are held, with the major events occurring early in the weekend. "Little Norway" celebrates May 17 with a longer and more enthusiastic celebration than any known Norwegian-American settlement or community. Recently Petersburg residents have traveled to Norway and have found that their American celebration of Norwegian Constitution day (Norwegian: grunnlovsdag) is longer than that in Norway, where they celebrate only on May 17.
- The Petersburg Marine Mammal Center is a teaching center and supports research into new discoveries.
- Established in 1968, the Clausen Memorial Museum is dedicated to preserving the history and telling the story of those who have lived and worked in Petersburg and the surrounding area.
- Petersburg is twinned with Hammerfest Municipality in Norway.

== Education ==
- The Petersburg School District comprises Rae C. Stedman Elementary School, Mitkof Middle School, and Petersburg High School.

== Media ==
The town's only radio station is a community-owned and operation KFSK, which carries a public radio format.

KRSA previously broadcast from Petersburg with a religious format, until its license expired in February 2014.

The Petersburg Pilot is a weekly newspaper established in 1974, that currently publishes a paper every Thursday.

== Infrastructure ==
=== Transportation ===
Located on an island with no bridges to the mainland, Petersburg can be accessed only by air or sea.

==== Marine transportation ====
Petersburg receives service from the Alaska Marine Highway. It is a stop on the Inside Passage route that sees scheduled service both southbound and northbound to other Southeast Alaskan communities; Bellingham, Washington; and Prince Rupert, British Columbia, Canada.

==== Air transportation ====
Jet carrier Alaska Airlines serves Petersburg with both cargo and passenger service from the Petersburg James A. Johnson Airport from Wrangell and Juneau daily, with service ultimately reaching Anchorage and Seattle. Three charter air companies operate here.

== Notable people ==
- Elizabeth Peratrovich (1911-1958) Alaska Native civil rights leader, born in Petersburg.
- Edna Jackson (born 1950), artist, was born in Petersburg.
- Bert Stedman spent a large part of his childhood living in Petersburg.
- Scott McAdams lived in Petersburg for a number of years during childhood before moving to Sitka.
- Rosita Worl, president of the Sealaska Heritage Institute, grew up in Petersburg before being forcibly relocated to an American Indian boarding school in Haines.

== See also ==
- List of census-designated places in Alaska
