= KRSA (Alaska) =

Radio station in Petersburg, Alaska (1982–2014)

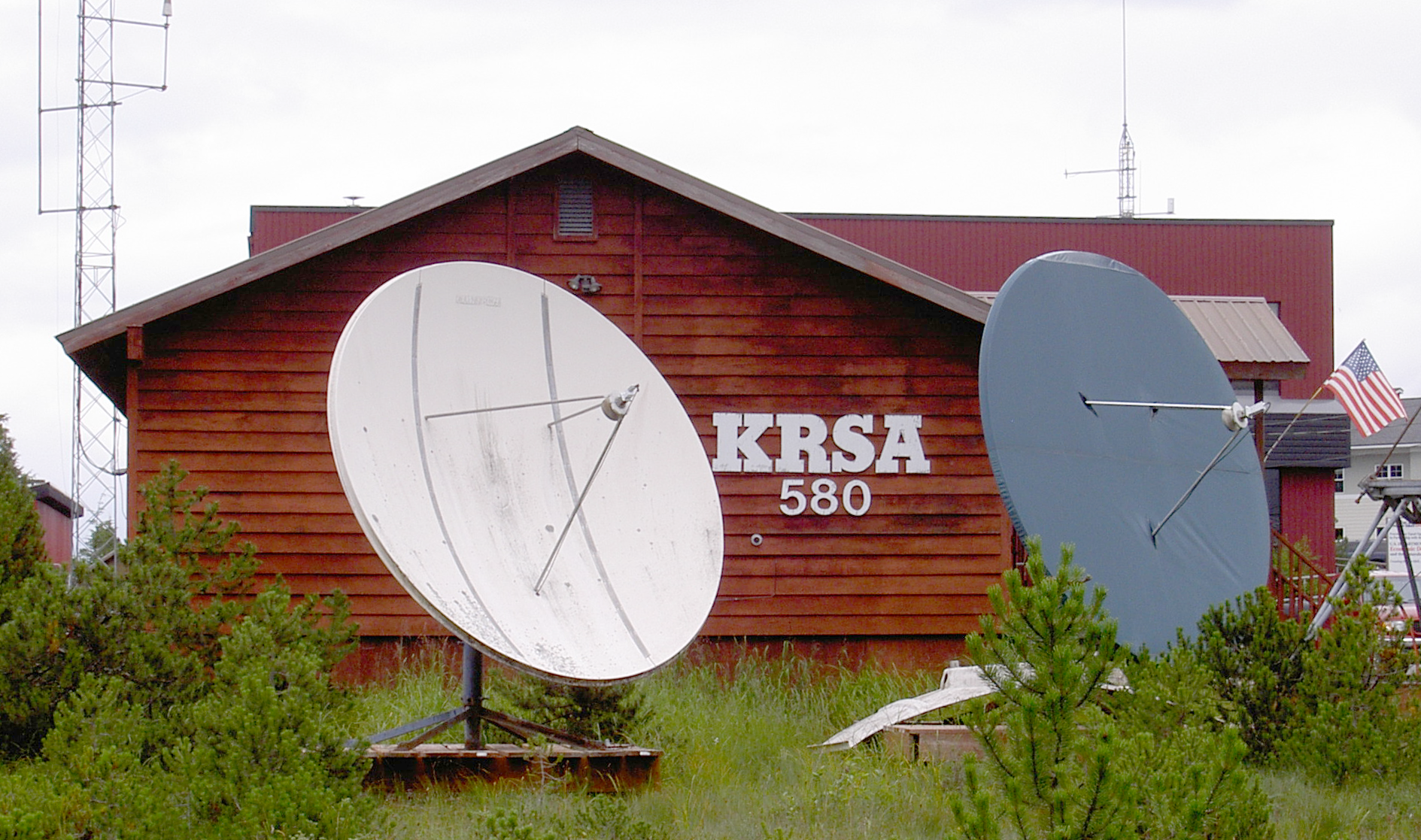
- The KRSA studios located in Petersburg, Alaska, August 2011
- Petersburg, Alaska; United States
- Broadcast area: Southeast Alaska
- Frequency: 580 kHz

Ownership
- Owner: Sea-Christ Broadcasting Corporation

History
- First air date: September 24, 1982
- Last air date: February 1, 2014
- Call sign meaning: "Radio Southeast Alaska"

Technical information
- Facility ID: 49566
- Class: B
- Power: 5,000 watts
- Transmitter coordinates: 56°40′23.0″N 132°55′0.0″W

KRSA (580 AM) was a broadcast radio station licensed to Petersburg, Alaska, serving Southeast Alaska. KRSA was last owned and operated by Sea-Christ Broadcasting Corporation.

== History ==
KRSA's original construction permit was issued on July 24, 1981 and the station went on the air for the first time on September 24, 1982, under the ownership of Northern Light Network. Northern Light Network was and still is a subsidiary of the interdenominational Christian mission agency, SEND International, which is based out of Farmington, Michigan.

On December 14, 2010, Northern Light Network sold KRSA and the three association translator stations to Petersburg-based Sea-Christ Broadcasting Corporation for $1.00. The deal was closed on February 3, 2011, with the new owner, Sea-Christ Broadcasting Corporation, taking full ownership of the station and translators.

KRSA debuted a new live-and-local morning news and talk program called "The Narrow Way" shortly after the sale was closed.

=== Closure ===
KRSA and its translators fell silent on December 31, 2012. Board of Director President Ed May said, at the time, the station was "in the process of redirecting its ministry" and that the "non-profit couldn't afford to keep broadcasting".

On December 11, 2013, KRSA resumed operations according to documents filed with the Federal Communications Commission (FCC). More than a month later, on January 30, 2014, the FCC announced that Sea-Christ Broadcasting Corporation had failed to file a license renewal application for KRSA or any of its translators. The licenses for KRSA and its translators all expired and were cancelled on February 1, 2014.

== Programming ==
KRSA carried programming featuring religious teaching from various sources including James Dobson's Focus on the Family, Moody Radio, VCY America and Salem Radio Network. The station also aired secular programming including the morning news program Bill Bennett's "Morning in America" and top-of-the-hour news from United News and Information. Sports programming from the Seattle Mariners Radio Network and the Seattle Seahawks Radio Network were also heard on KRSA.

== Translators ==
KRSA previously broadcast its main frequency not only on 580 AM, but also on three translator stations. Those stations all previously broadcast on 94.9 FM.

Call sign	Frequency	City of license	FID	ERP (W)	HAAT	Class	FCC info
DK235AC	94.9 FM	Sitka, Alaska	49565	395 watts	33 m (108 ft)	D	LMS
DK235AD	94.9 FM	Wrangell, Alaska	49567	18 watts	−60 m (−197 ft)	D	LMS
DK235AJ	94.9 FM	Haines, Alaska	49568	50 watts	−311 m (−1,020 ft)	D	LMS
