= Kupreanof Island =

Island in Alaska, US

Kupreanof
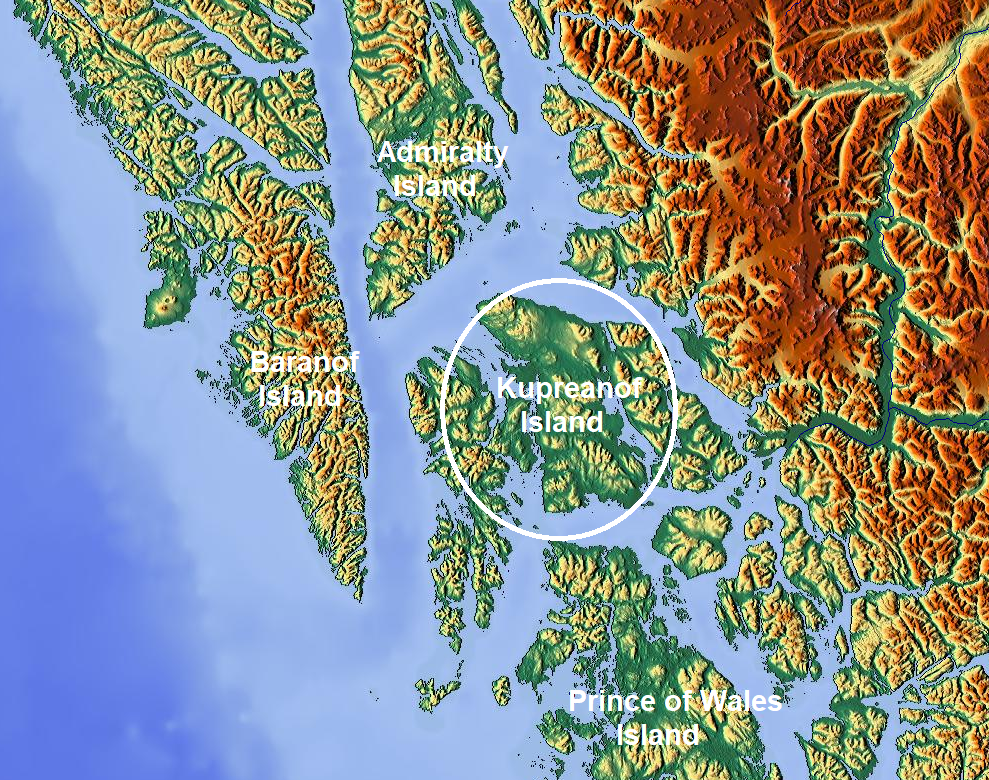
- Location of Kupreanof Island

- Location within Alaska

Geography
- Coordinates: 56°47′34″N 133°29′49″W
- Archipelago: Alexander Archipelago
- Area: 1,082.18 sq mi (2,802.8 km^{2})
- Length: 52 mi (84 km)
- Width: 20 mi (30 km)
- Highest elevation: 3,900 ft (1190 m)
- Highest point: Sherman Peak

Administration
- United States
- State: Alaska
- Borough/Census Area: Petersburg and Prince of Wales–Hyder
- Largest settlement: Kake (pop. 710)

Demographics
- Population: 785 (2000)
- Pop. density: 0.28/km^{2} (0.73/sq mi)

Kupreanof Island (Russian: Остров Купреянова) is an island in the Alexander Archipelago in southeastern Alaska. The island is 84 km (52 mi) long and 32 km (20 mi) wide with a total land area is 2,802.84 km^{2} (1,082.18 sq mi), making it the 13th largest island in the United States and the 170th largest island in the world. The Lindenberg Peninsula on the southeast side of the island is considered part of the island. The peninsula is separated from the rest of the island by a narrow inlet called Duncan Canal. The island's population was 785 at the 2000 census.

The island was first charted in 1793–1794 by James Johnstone and Joseph Whidbey, both part of British naval officer George Vancouver's 1791–1795 expedition. The island is named after vice admiral Ivan Antonovich Kupreianov, governor of the Russian American colonies from 1836 to 1840; the name was published in 1848 on a Russian Hydrographic Department chart as "Os(trov) Kupreyanova".

The largest settlement on the island is Kake, on the northwestern side of the island. The only other city is Kupreanof, on the eastern side, across the Wrangell Narrows from the city of Petersburg on nearby Mitkof Island. The island lies within the limits of Tongass National Forest (Petersburg Ranger District). The Petersburg Creek–Duncan Salt Chuck Wilderness is a part of the forest that is located on the island.
