= Mitkof Island =

Island in southeastern Alaska, USA

Coordinates: 56°35′54″N 132°48′33″W

Mitkof
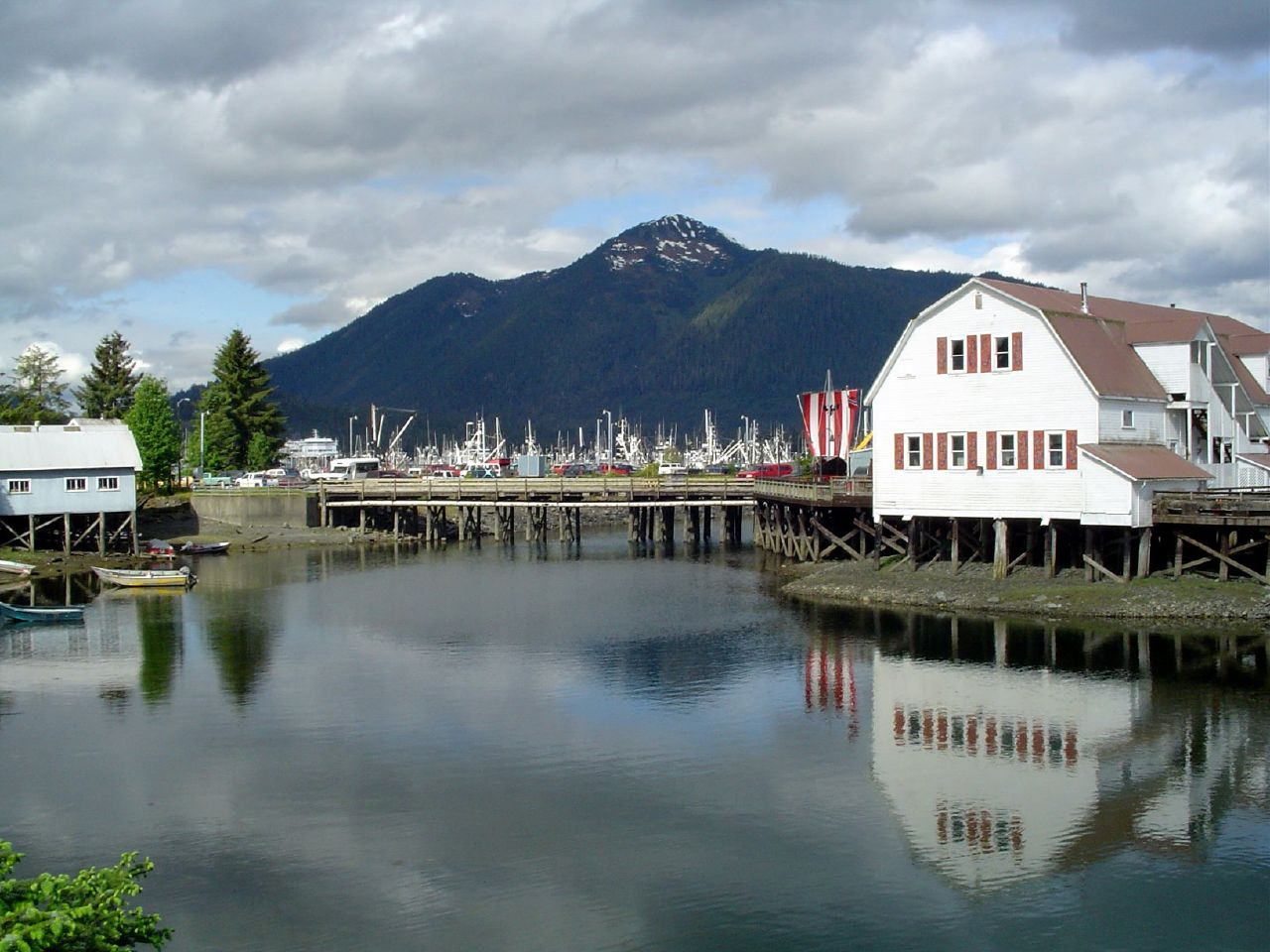
- Petersburg in 2005, with Petersburg Mountain (Kupreanof Island) in the background

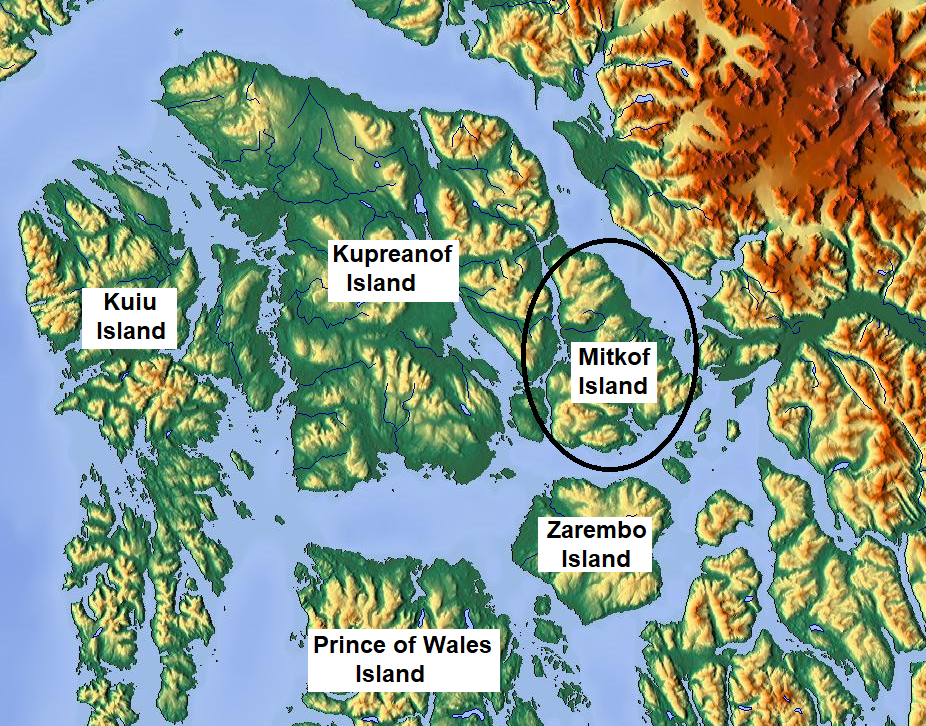

Geography
- Archipelago: Alexander Archipelago
- Area: 208.4 sq mi (540 km^{2})
- Length: 17 mi (27 km)
- Width: 9.9 mi (15.9 km)
- Highest elevation: 3,317 ft (1011 m)
- Highest point: Crystal Mountain

Administration
- United States
- State: Alaska
- Borough: Petersburg
- Largest settlement: Petersburg

Demographics
- Population: 3364 (2000)

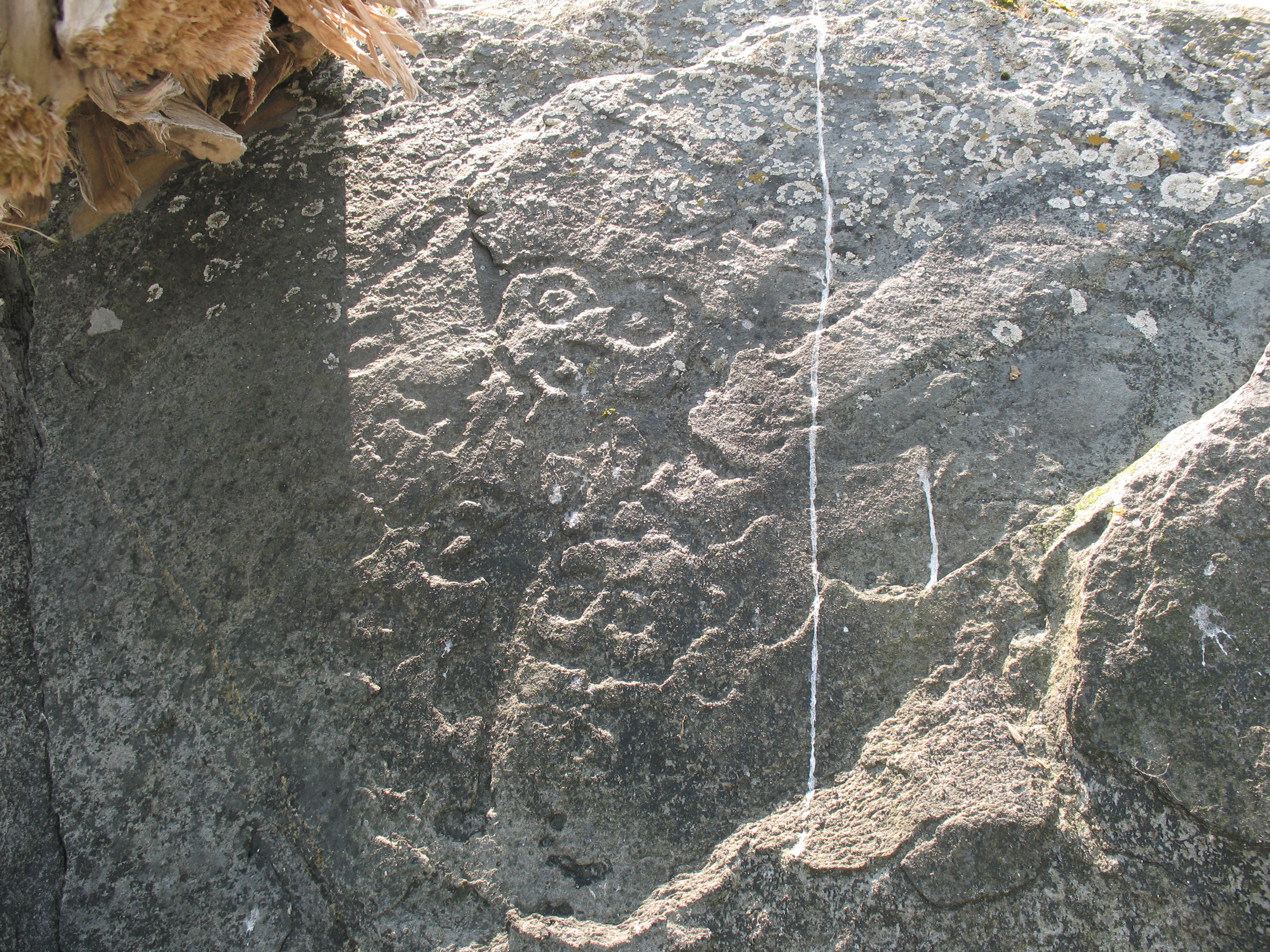
Petroglyphs near Petersburg, Mitkof Island, Alaska.

Mitkof Island is an island in the Alexander Archipelago in southeast Alaska between Kupreanof Island to the west and the Alaskan mainland to the east. It is approximately 16 km (9.9 mi) wide and 28 km (17 mi) long with a land area of 539.7 km^{2} (208.4 sq mi), making it the 30th largest island in the United States. Much of the island is managed as part of the Tongass National Forest.

The island is relatively flat with numerous muskegs. The highest point is Crystal Mountain 3,317 ft (1,011 m).

The city of Petersburg is on the north end of the island. It's the headquartered of the Petersburg Indian Association, a federally recognized Tlingit tribe. The total population of the island was 3,364 at the 2000 census, almost all of it in the city of Petersburg.

The island is surrounded by Frederick Sound to the north, Dry Strait to the east, Sumner Strait to the south, and Wrangell Narrows to the west. Bordered by Mitkof Island on one side, and Kuprenof and Woewodski Islands on the other, the Wrangell Narrows creates the only navigable 'Inside Passage' at this latitude and is one of the six Listed Narrows of Southeast Alaska. Because of their shallow depths, the largest cruise ships do not pass through Wrangell Narrows or through Dry Strait. Spirit Creek is the southernmost stream on the island in the Wrangell Narrows, just two miles from where the narrows opens onto Sumner Strait.

== History ==
The island has historically been the home of the Séet Ká Ḵwáan Tlingit people.

The first European to sight the island was James Johnstone, one of George Vancouver's officers during his 1791-95 expedition, in 1793. The island is shown as separate from Kupreanof Island in an 1844 Russian chart, while the name was published in 1848 on a Russian Hydrographic Department chart as "Os(trov) Mitkova" for an Admiral Prokofy Mitkov.
