= Alexander Archipelago =

Islands in southeastern Alaska, USA

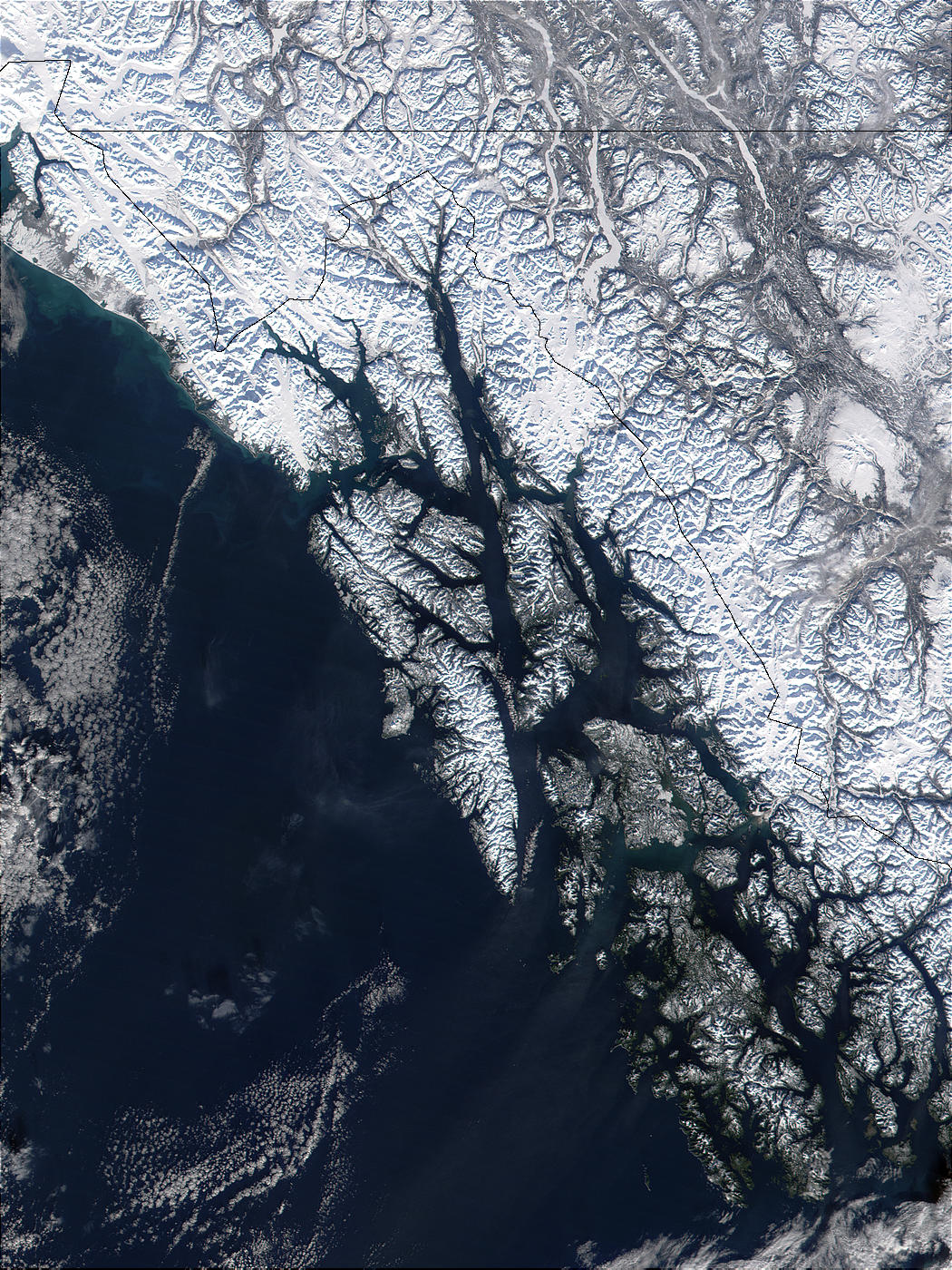
- A MODIS photograph of the Alexander Archipelago

- Location within Alaska

Geography
- Location: Pacific Ocean
- Coordinates: 57°N 134°W

Administration
- United States
- State: Alaska

The Alexander Archipelago (Russian: Архипелаг Александра) is a 300-mile-long (480 km) archipelago in North America lying off the southeastern coast of Alaska. It contains about 1,100 islands, the tops of submerged coastal mountains that rise steeply from the Pacific Ocean. Deep channels and fjords separate the islands and cut them off from the mainland. The islands shelter the northern part of the Inside Passage as it winds its way among them.

The islands have steep, irregular coasts and dense evergreen and temperate rain forests; most are accessible only by boat or by airplane. The vast majority of the islands are part of the Tongass National Forest.

In order of land area, the largest islands are Prince of Wales Island, Chichagof Island, Admiralty Island, Baranof Island, Revillagigedo Island, Kupreanof Island, Kuiu Island, Etolin Island, Dall Island, Wrangell Island, Mitkof Island, Zarembo Island, Kosciusko Island, Kruzof Island, Annette Island, Gravina Island, and Yakobi Island. All the islands are rugged, densely forested, and have an abundance of wildlife.

The Tlingit and Kaigani Haida people are native to the area. The Tsimshian people found on Annette Island are not originally from the area, having immigrated to the region from British Columbia in the late 19th century.

Ketchikan on Revillagigedo Island and Sitka on Baranof Island are the largest towns on the islands. The most populous neighborhoods of the largest town in the region, Juneau, stand on the mainland, though portions of the city also lie on Douglas Island, which is a part of the archipelago.

Tourism, fishing, and logging are the main industries of the islands.

== History ==
The first European to visit the archipelago was the Russian navigator Aleksei Chirikov in 1741, who sighted the coasts of Noyes and Baker Islands (both off the west coast of Prince of Wales Island), as well as Baranof, Chichagof, Kruzof, and Yakobi Islands. In 1774, Juan José Pérez Hernández sighted the south coast of Dall Island, while Juan Francisco de la Bodega y Quadra entered Bucareli Bay off Prince of Wales Island the following year. In 1792, Jacinto Caamaño sighted Revillagigedo Island and the Gravina Islands, discovering Clarence Strait. George Vancouver and his men made an extensive survey of the archipelago in 1793 and 1794, circumnavigating both Revillagigedo and Admiralty Islands, charting the entirety of Kuiu Island, the east sides of Baranof and Chichagof Islands, and Etolin, Wrangell, Zarembo, Mitkof, and Kupreanof Islands. Within a decade, the Russians had traversed Peril Strait separating Chichagof and Baranof Islands, and in the following decades found the straits and passages separating several of the other major islands. An 1844 Russian chart shows Kupreanof separated from Mitkof Island and Etolin, Wrangell, Woronkofski, and Zarembo Islands separated from each other.

The archipelago was a locus of the Maritime Fur Trade during the early 19th century. Control of the islands passed from Russia to the United States with the Alaska Purchase in 1867.

According to Donald Orth's Dictionary of Alaska Place Names (p. 64), the Alexander Archipelago received its name from the U.S. Coast and Geodetic Survey in 1867. The island chain is named for Tsar Alexander II of Russia.

On an 1860 map of Russian America (Alaska), the island group is called the King George III Archipelago.

== See also ==
- Category:Islands of the Alexander Archipelago
- Alexander Archipelago wolf
- British Columbia Coast
- Boundary Ranges
- Dixon Entrance
- Hunter Bay
- William Henry Bay
