= Windham Bay =

Bay in the U.S. state of Alaska

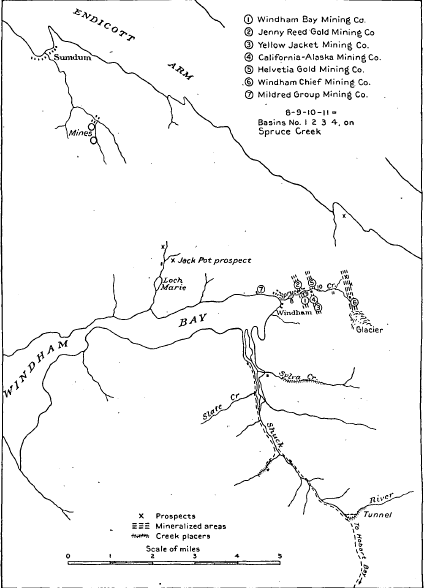
Map of Windham Bay showing principal mines

Windham Bay is located 45 miles (72 km) southeast of Juneau, in the U.S. state of Alaska. Windham Bay is listed as site 6 within Southeast Alaska's Zone 3 of the Alaska Dept. of Environmental Conservation's Geographic Response Strategy oil spill response plan. Part of the bay is a protected wilderness area; the Chuck River Wilderness, established in 1990 by the United States Congress, covers an area of 74,506 acres (30,152 ha). The Chuck River flows into Windham Bay, which has a protected anchorage north of Port Houghton, where the historic Chuck Mining Camp once operated.

== History ==
The earliest gold production in Alaska occurred in Windham Bay and Sumdum Bay in 1870-71 subsequent to an 1869 gold placer deposit discovery at the two locations. The Windham Bay Gold Mining Company was located .75 miles (1.21 km) from the bay, on the south slopes of Spruce Creek. It consisted of nine claims known as the "Red Wing" group.

== Geography ==
The bay is at the mouth of the Chuck River, a stream 7 miles (11 km) in length, which flows into the Windham Bay north of Port Houghton at 57.584°N 133.357°W. A sheltered tidal flat, the bay habitat consists of marshy land and estuaries. While the bay is a protected anchorage for use by boaters from Stephens Passage, the valley formed upstream of the bay by Chuck River has elevations varying from sea level to about 5,000 feet (1,500 m) on its eastern extremity. A narrow inlet, 8 miles (13 km) in length, has an entrance 22 miles (35 km) above Cape Fanshaw. From its entrance, which is 1.5 miles (2.4 km) wide, the bay narrows rapidly to a neck .2 miles (0.32 km) wide connecting with a deep inner basin nearly 4 miles (6.4 km) in length and 0.5 miles (0.80 km) wide. At the head of the bay is an extensive tide flat.

The settlement known as Windham is situated on the northeast side of the bay. From the southeast side of this inner bay, a broad flat extends southward for 2 miles (3.2 km), its inland continuation lying within the valley of Chuck River. The surrounding mountains are the same that border the south side of Endicott Arm, the peaks ranging from 3,000–5,000 feet (910–1,520 m) in altitude.

== Geology ==
Geologically, Windham Bay is located 7 miles (11 km) southwest of the Coast Range diorite. Its headwaters enter the schist band, the rocks of which are likewise exposed along the south shore of Endicott Arm. At the head of the bay is a band of slate which appears to continue over the divide to Sanford Cove and southward up the valley of Chuck River. West of the slate beds is a slate-greenstone belt composing the shore bluffs at the entrance of Windham Bay. Several outlying masses of diorite intrude into the inlet.

== Flora and fauna ==
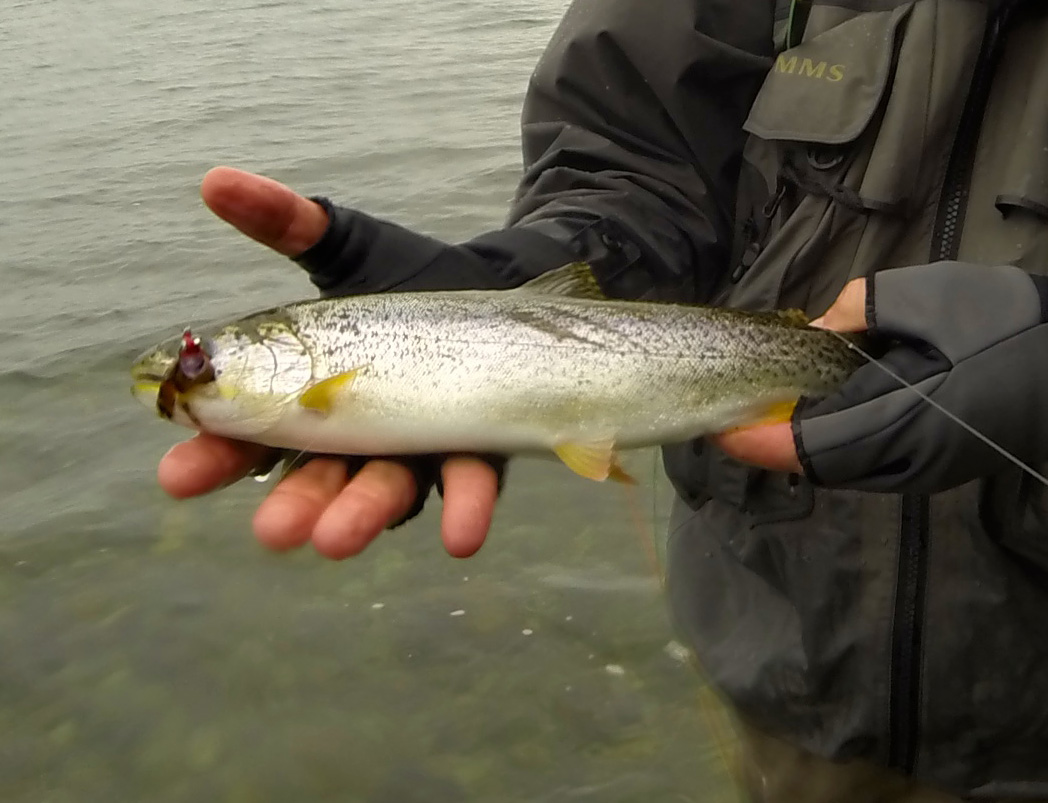
Sea-run coastal cutthroat trout (Oncorhynchus clarki clarki) from Puget Sound beach

The river stretch from its headwaters down to the bay is thickly forested riparian forest vegetation. The Chuck River Wilderness, located at the head of the Bay, was established in 1990 under a directive of the United States Congress. It is located 70 miles (110 km) southeast of Juneau. It encompasses an area of 74,506 acres (30,152 ha) entirely within Alaska and is managed by the Forest Service.

Marine mammals found here and which are protected include harbor seals, salmon and trout (coastal cutthroat trout) concentrations. The salmon species reported are sockeye, pink, coho, chum and chinook salmon, steelhead, and Dolly Varden trout. Water fowl concentrations are reported during winter months. Black bears, wolves and mountain goats are reported in the mountainous regions of the valley.
