= Mount Sumdum =

Mountain in Alaska, United States

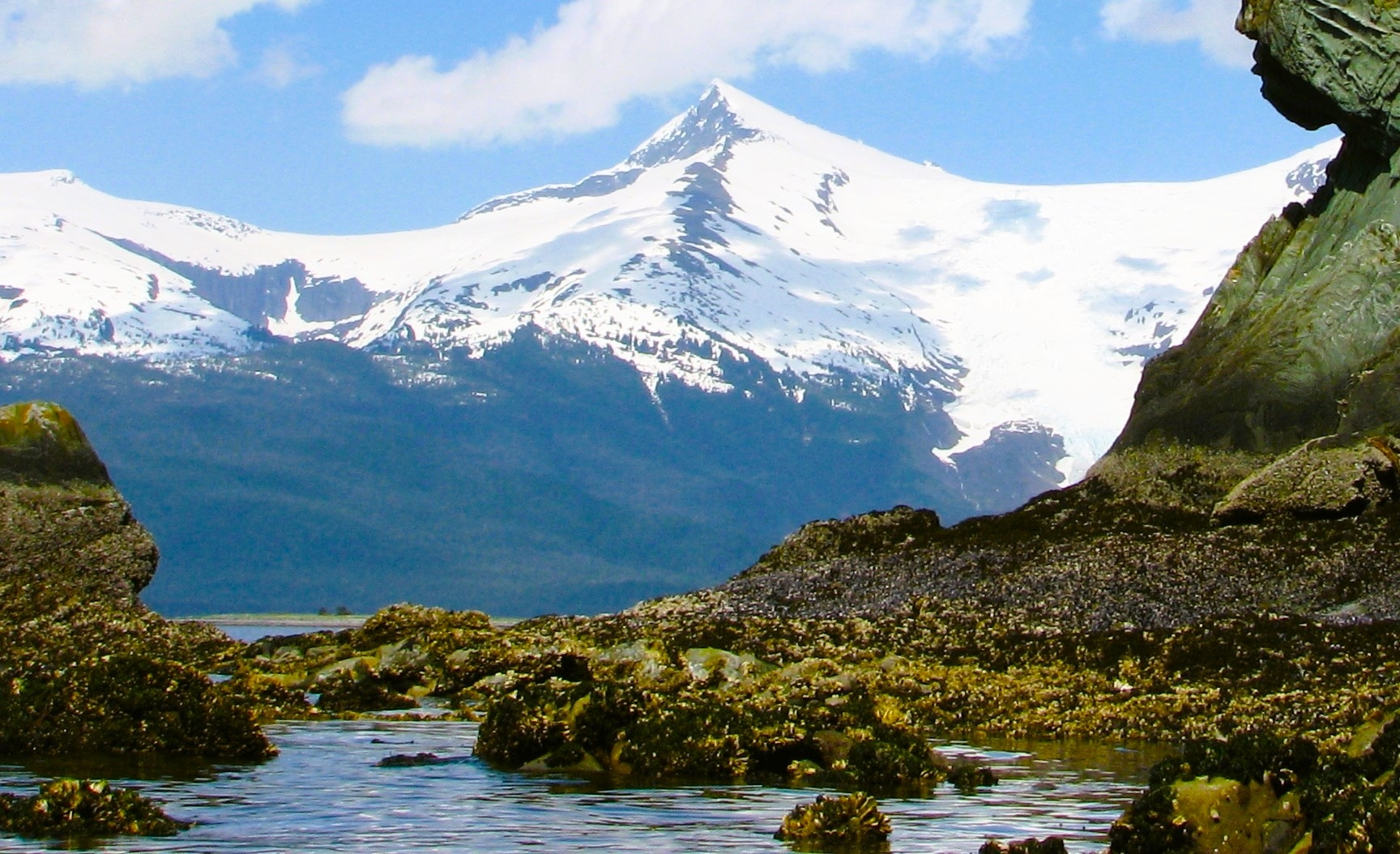
- Southwest aspect

Highest point
- Elevation: 6,666 ft (2,032 m)
- Prominence: 3,516 ft (1,072 m)
- Parent peak: Peak 7160
- Isolation: 13.31 mi (21.42 km)
- Coordinates: 57°48′22″N 133°26′14″W

Geography
- Location within Alaska
- Interactive map of Mount Sumdum
- Country: United States
- State: Alaska
- Borough: Petersburg
- Protected area: Tracy Arm-Fords Terror Wilderness; Tongass National Forest
- Parent range: Coast Mountains; Boundary Ranges
- Topo map: USGS Sumdum D-5

Geology
- Rock type: Metamorphic rock

Climbing
- Easiest route: class 3 Scrambling

Mount Sumdum is a 6,666-foot-elevation (2,032-meter) mountain summit in Alaska, United States.

== Description ==
Mount Sumdum is located 50 miles (80 km) southeast of Juneau in the Boundary Ranges of the Coast Mountains. It is set within the Tracy Arm-Fords Terror Wilderness on land managed by Tongass National Forest. Precipitation runoff and glacial meltwater from the mountain drains to Tracy Arm and Endicott Arm. Although modest in elevation, topographic relief is significant as the summit rises 6,666 feet (2,032 m) above tidewater of each arm in 4.5 miles (7.2 km). The mountain's toponym has been officially adopted by the United States Board on Geographic Names. The mountain is named for the Sumdum Glacier on its southern flank and the toponym was published in 1895 by the United States Coast and Geodetic Survey. The name was "Soundon" aand was reported as being a Tlingit name which represents the booming sound of icebergs as they break off from the glacier.

Current scholarship based on Tlingit language work is that the area (of bay, mountain, and glacier) was known as Sʼawdáan. There are two suggested origins, people of the "Greenstone ARea" (from sʼoow-déin) or people of the "Dungeness crab Area" (from sʼáaw-déin).

== Climate ==
Based on the Köppen climate classification, Mount Sumdum has a tundra climate with long, cold, snowy winters, and mild summers. Weather systems coming off the Gulf of Alaska are forced upwards by the Coast Mountains (orographic lift), causing heavy precipitation in the form of rainfall and snowfall. Winter temperatures can drop to 0 °F with wind chill factors below −10 °F. This climate supports the Sumdum Glacier on the peak's south flank as well as smaller unnamed glaciers on the surrounding slopes.

== Gallery ==
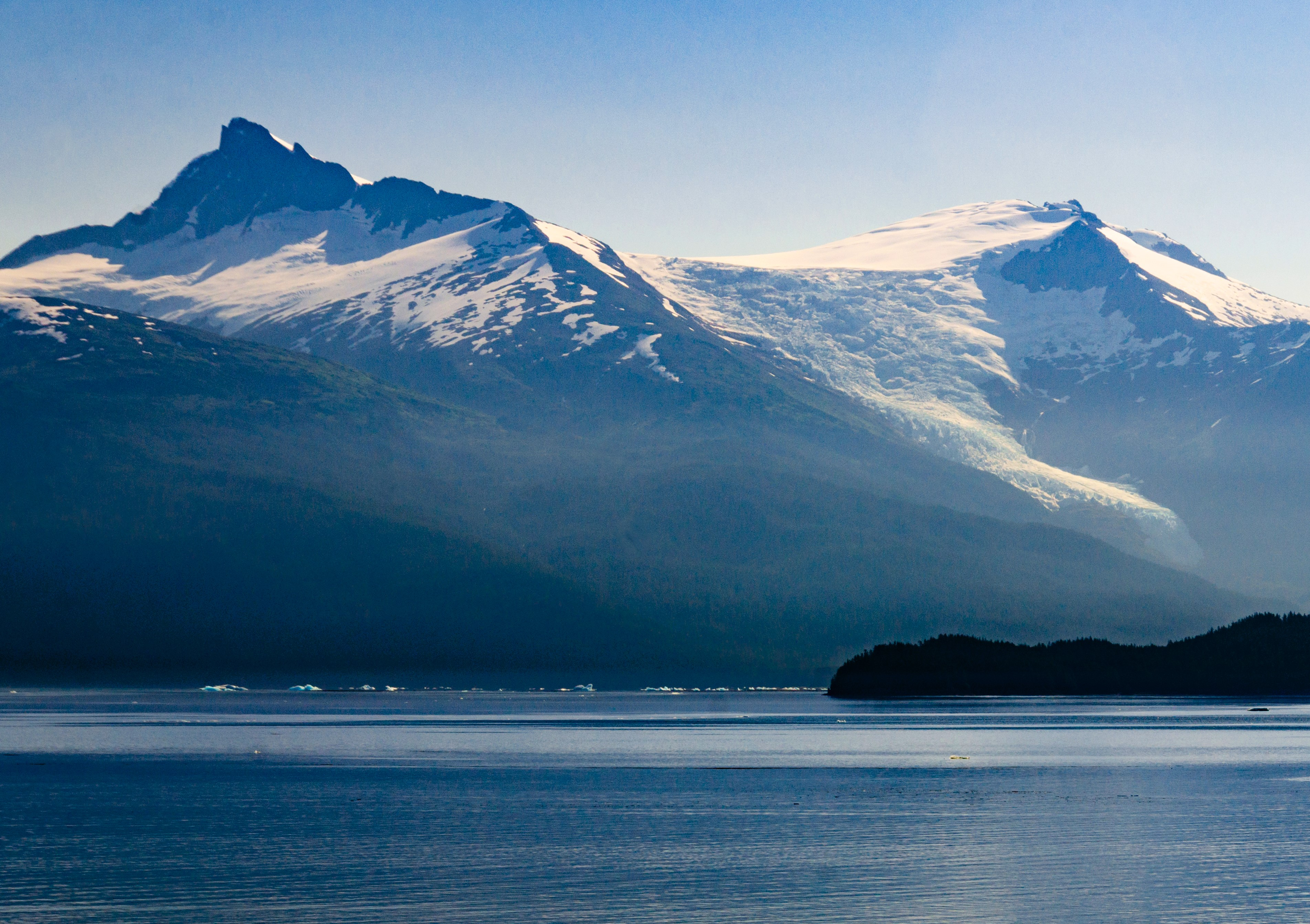
Mt. Sumdum and Sumdum Glacier

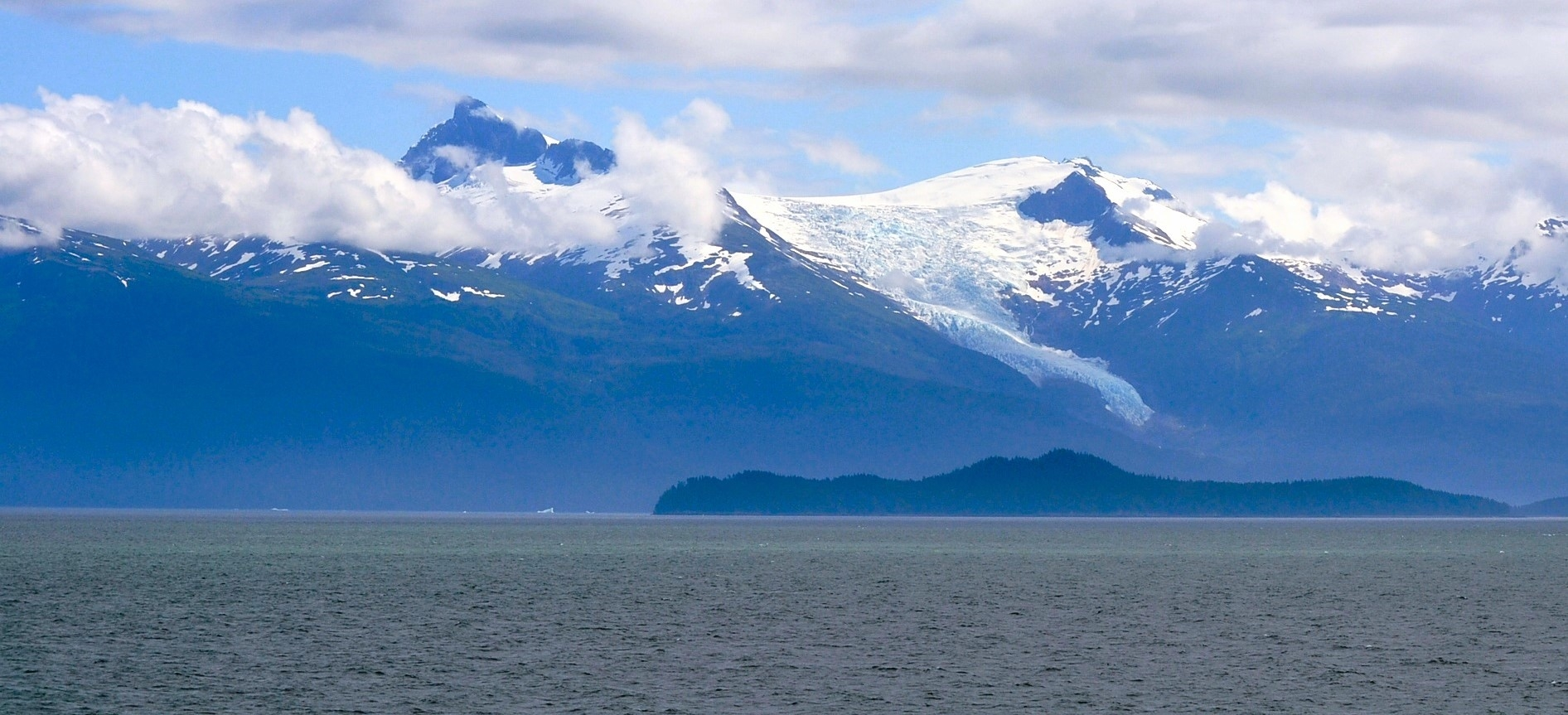
Mt. Sumdum and Sumdum Glacier

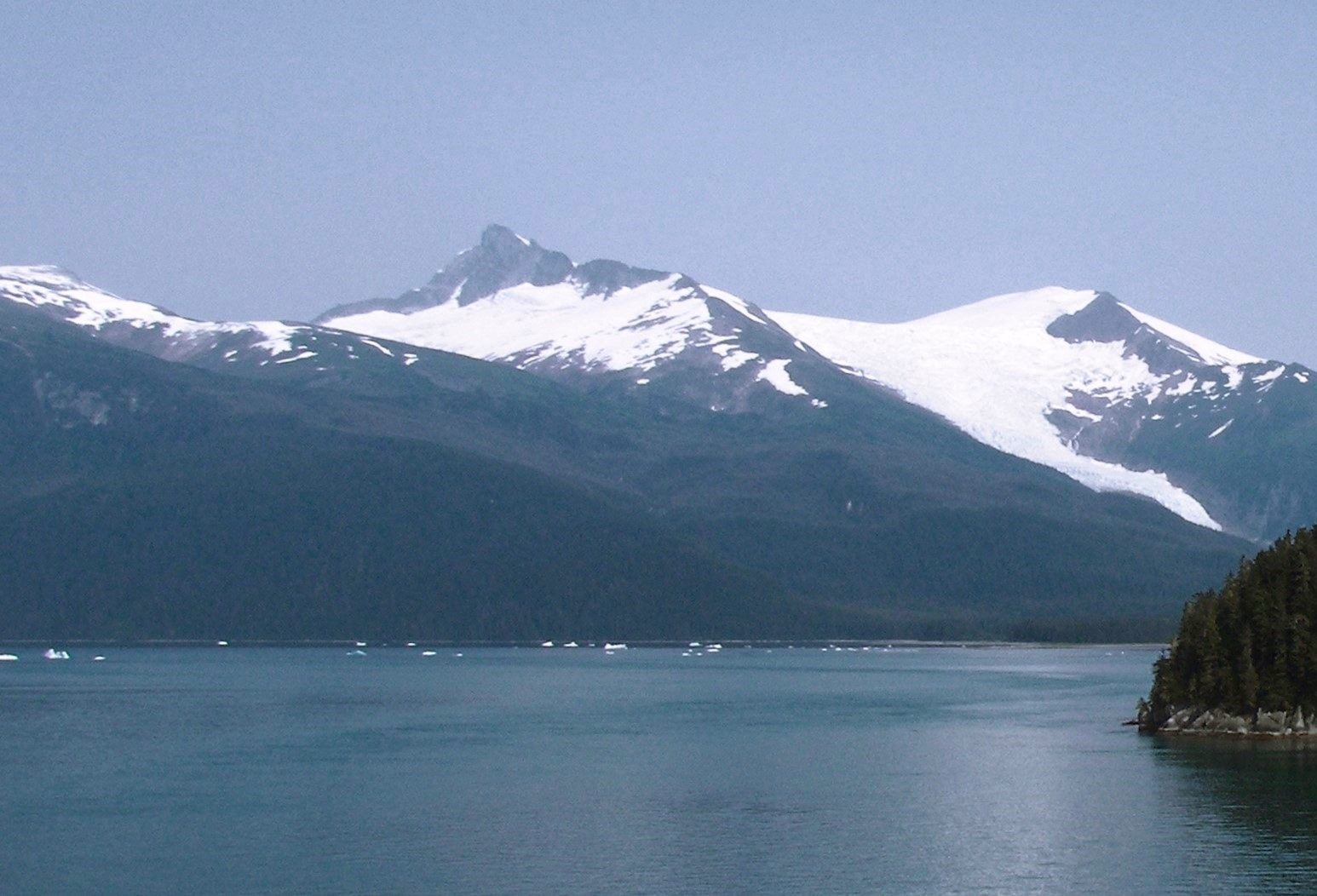
Mt. Sumdum, west aspect from Holkham Bay

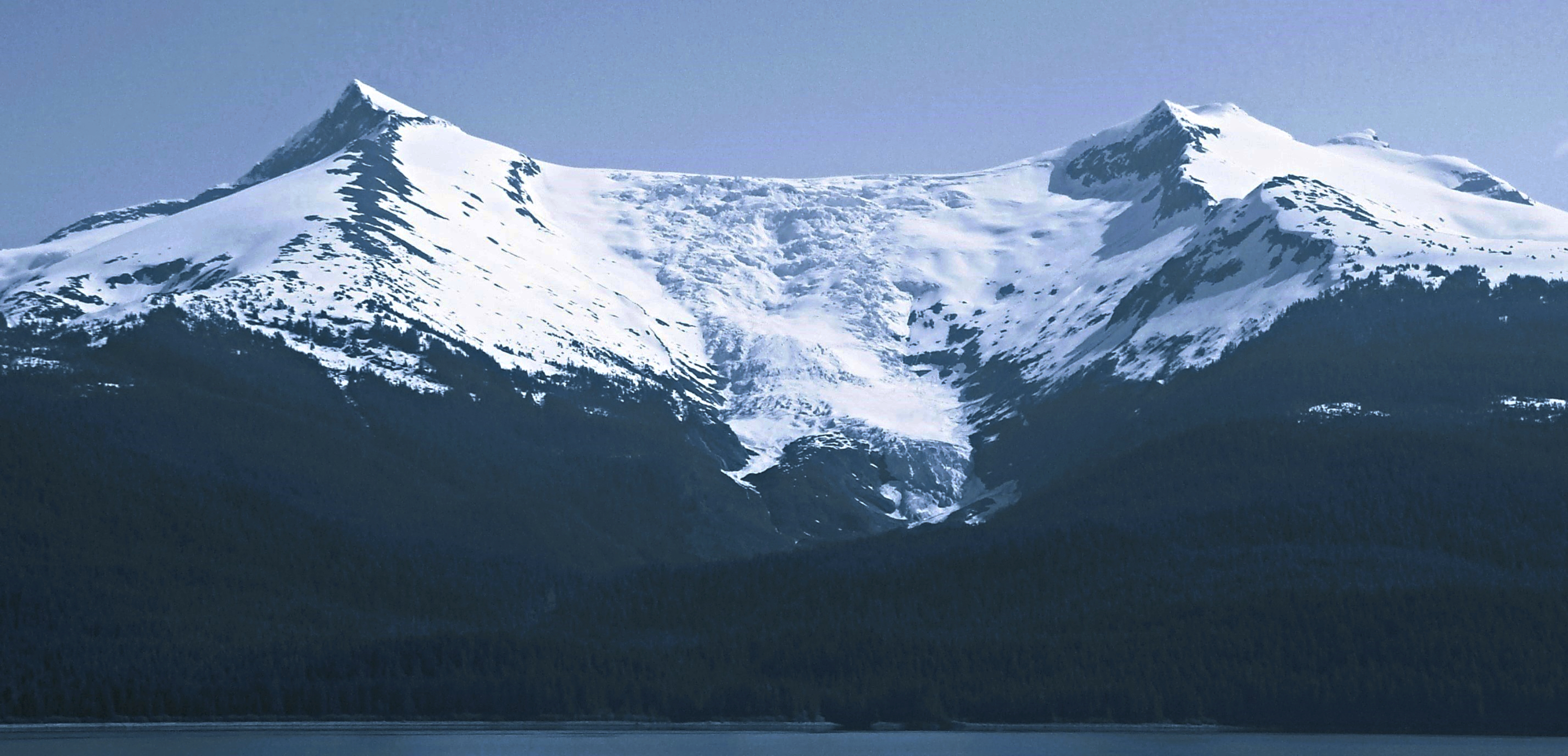

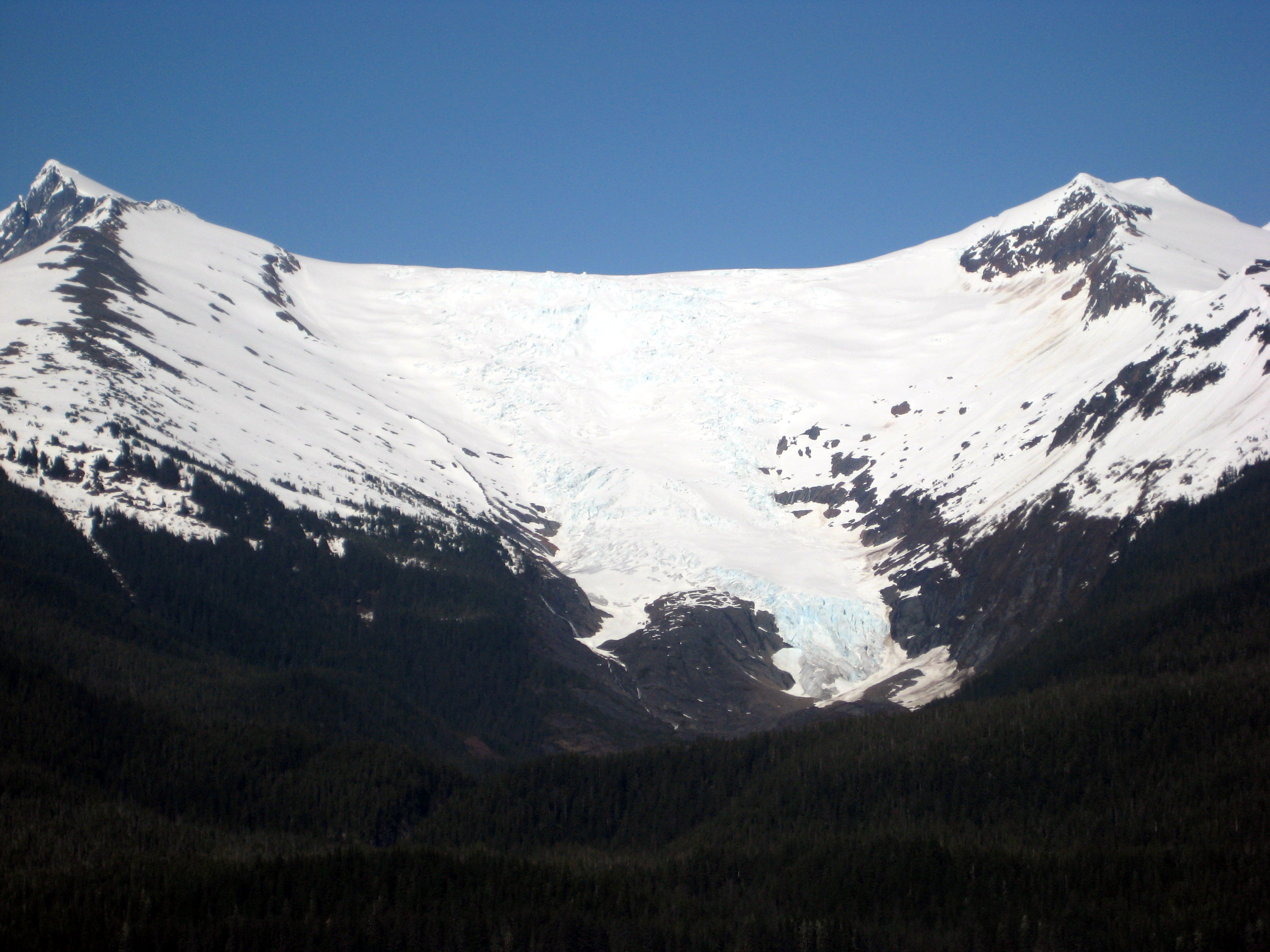
Sumdum Glacier

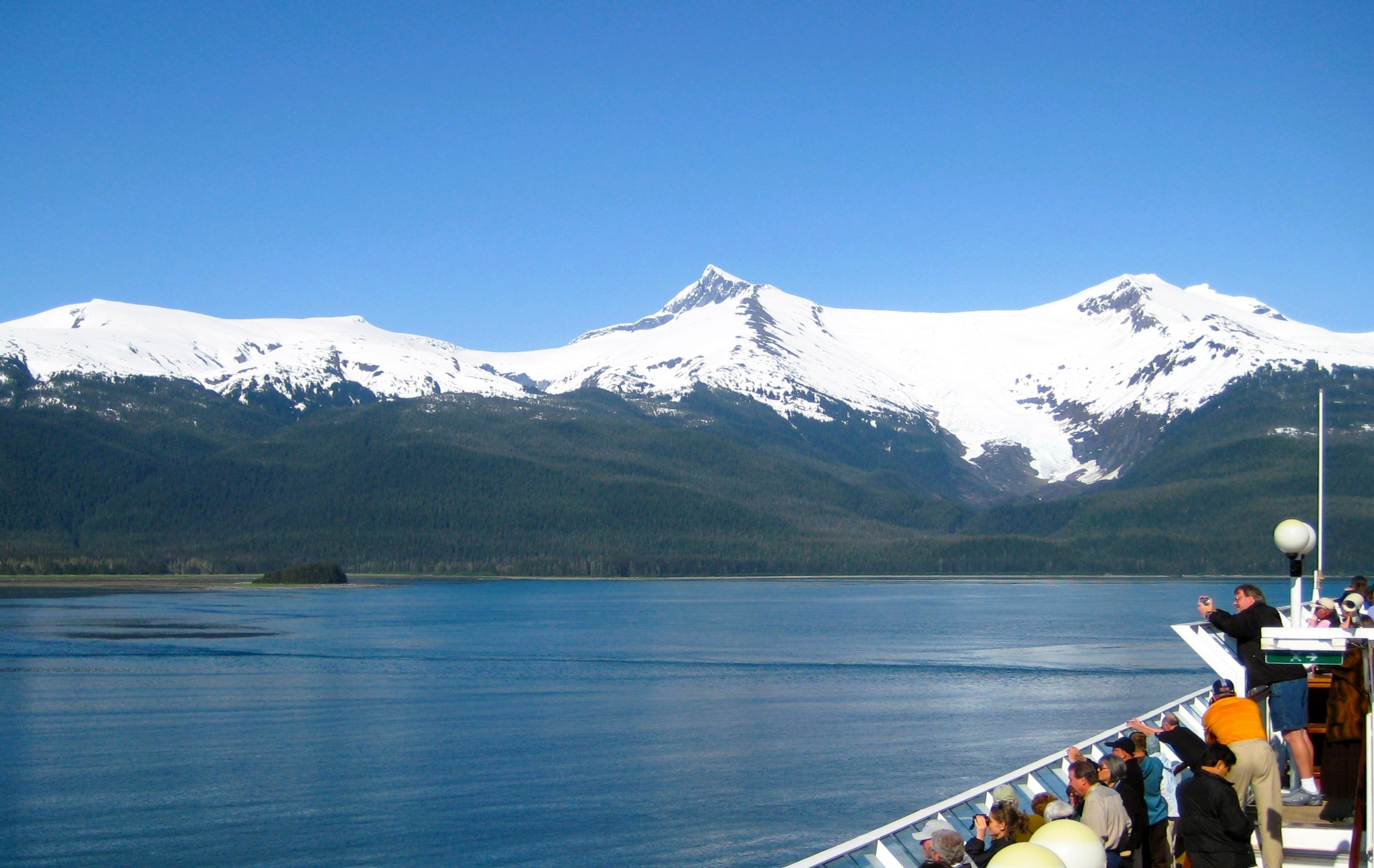

== See also ==
- List of mountain peaks of Alaska
- Geography of Alaska
