= Huna Totem Corporation =

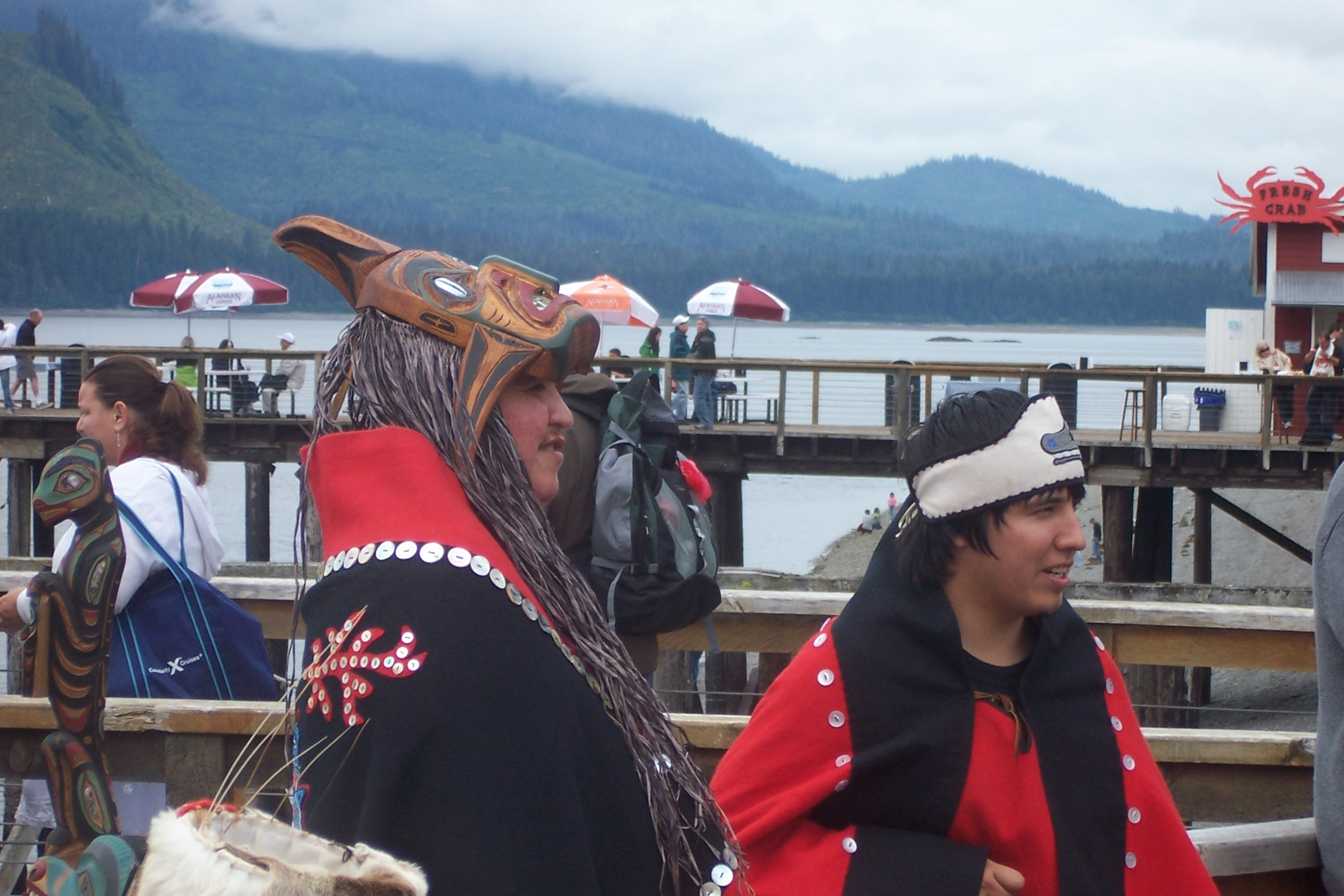
Tlingit garbed people and items at the cruise ship destination Icy Strait Point which is funded by the corporation

Huna Totem Corporation (HTC) is a for-profit corporation formed under the Alaska Native Claims Settlement Act (ANCSA), enacted by the U.S. Congress on December 18, 1971. Regional and village corporations were formed under ANCSA, of which Huna Totem is one of the village corporations. Sealaska Corporation is the regional corporation for Southeast Alaska. Huna Totem Corporation was incorporated on November 9, 1973.

== Shareholders ==
Huna Totem Corporation initially enrolled 876 shareholders and came to have over 1,350 shareholders, all of whom have aboriginal ties to the village of Hoonah and Glacier Bay. In February 2013 the Huna Totem Corporation Board adopted a vision statement "to advance the economic aspirations and culture of the Xúna Kaawu through business excellence, sustainable economic growth, leadership, and education." Huna Totem provides financial benefits to its shareholders primarily in four ways: dividends from corporate profits, distributions from the Huna Totem Corporation Shareholders Settlement Trust, a one-time payment to original shareholders upon reaching age 65 from the HTC Elders' Benefit Trust, and funding of educational scholarships which are awarded by the Huna Heritage Foundation. In 2012 Huna Totem Corporation generated revenue from several business lines, including tourism, natural resources, interpretive services, commercial real estate and leasing, construction, and its investment portfolio. In earlier years, the timber industry brought in money for many village corporations.

== Officers and directors ==
A current listing of Huna Totem Corporation's officers and directors, as well as documents filed with the State of Alaska, are available online through the Corporations Database of the Division of Corporations, Business & Professional Licensing, Alaska Department of Commerce, Community and Economic Development. Huna Totem Corporation operates under the policies determined by the Board of Directors, which has nine members. Each year, three directors are elected and serve 3-year terms. Day-to-day operations are up to the President and Chief Executive Officer, and Management.

== Business enterprises ==
Like other native corporations in Southeast Alaska, Huna Totem has taken a lead role in development for tourist activities in the region. One of the tourism subsidiaries that Huna Totem Corporation owns and continues to invest in is the cruise ship destination Icy Strait Point, located in Hoonah, Alaska.

Another tourism subsidiary owned by Huna Totem Corporation is Alaska Native Voices. In addition, the corporation owned the magazine Alaskan Southeaster, but the publication was ended in 2003 due to lack of consistent advertising revenue.
