= Hoonah–Angoon Census Area, Alaska =

Census area in Alaska, United States

- Borough
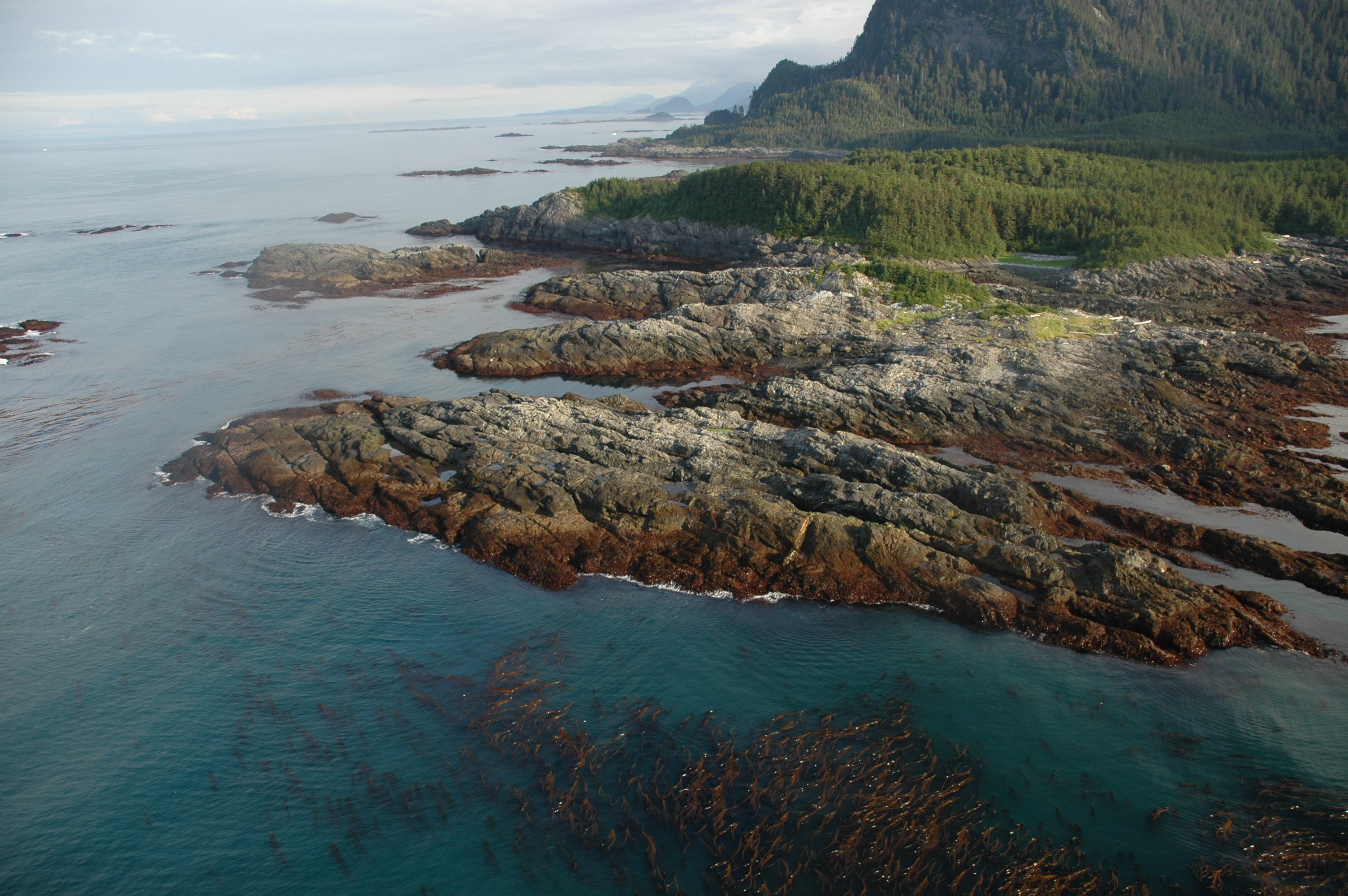
- Inland Passage to Dicks Arm, view from Cape Spencer Light

- Location within the U.S. state of Alaska
- Coordinates: 58°08′00″N 135°09′00″W
- Country: United States
- State: Alaska
- Established: 2007
- Named for: Hoonah and Angoon
- Largest city: Hoonah

Area
  - Total: 10,914 sq mi (28,270 km^{2})
  - Land: 7,525 sq mi (19,490 km^{2})
  - Water: 3,389 sq mi (8,780 km^{2}) 31.1%

Population (2020)
  - Total: 2,365
  - Estimate (2025): 2,271 ▼
  - Density: 0.3143/sq mi (0.1213/km^{2})
- Time zone: UTC−9 (Alaska)
  - Summer (DST): UTC−8 (ADT)
- Congressional district: At-large

Hoonah–Angoon Census Area is a census area located in the U.S. state of Alaska. As of the 2020 census, the population was 2,365, up from 2,150 in 2010. It is part of the unorganized borough and therefore has no borough seat. Its largest community is the city of Hoonah.

== History ==
Boundaries of the former Skagway-Yakutat-Angoon Census Area.

The census area was significantly larger in the 1990 census, at which time it was the Skagway–Yakutat–Angoon Census Area. After Yakutat was incorporated as a consolidated-city borough on September 22, 1992, it was renamed Skagway–Hoonah–Angoon Census Area; When Skagway followed suit on June 20, 2007, the census area assumed its current name.

== Geography ==
According to the U.S. Census Bureau, the census area has a total area of 10,914 square miles (28,270 km^{2}), of which 7,525 square miles (19,490 km^{2}) is land and 3,389 square miles (8,780 km^{2}) (31.1%) is water. A map showing its current boundaries is shown here:

=== Adjacent boroughs and census areas ===
- Yakutat City and Borough, Alaska – northwest
- Haines Borough, Alaska – northeast
- Juneau City and Borough, Alaska – northeast
- Petersburg Borough, Alaska – southeast
- Sitka City and Borough, Alaska – southwest
- Stikine Region, British Columbia – northwest, east
- Kitimat-Stikine Regional District, British Columbia – southeast

=== National protected areas ===
- Glacier Bay National Park (part)
  - Glacier Bay Wilderness (part)
- Tongass National Forest (part)
  - Admiralty Island National Monument (part)
    - Kootznoowoo Wilderness (part)
  - Chuck River Wilderness
  - Pleasant/Lemesurier/Inian Islands Wilderness
  - Tracy Arm-Fords Terror Wilderness (part)
  - West Chichagof-Yakobi Wilderness (part)

== Demographics ==
Map of the former Skagway–Hoonah–Angoon Census Area

:Note: Demographic data below is for the former "Skagway–Hoonah–Angoon" Census Area, which still includes Skagway Borough.

Historical population
Census	Pop.	Note	%±
2010	2,150		—
2020	2,365		10.0%
2025 (est.)	2,271	▼	−4.0%
U.S. Decennial Census; 2010–2020

=== 2020 census ===
Hoonah–Angoon Census Area, Alaska – Racial and ethnic composition Note: the US Census treats Hispanic/Latino as an ethnic category. This table excludes Latinos from the racial categories and assigns them to a separate category. Hispanics/Latinos may be of any race.
Race / Ethnicity (NH = Non-Hispanic)	Pop 2010	Pop 2020	% 2010	% 2020
White alone (NH)	993	1,123	46.19%	47.48%
Black or African American alone (NH)	8	6	0.37%	0.25%
Native American or Alaska Native alone (NH)	850	841	39.53%	35.56%
Asian alone (NH)	12	15	0.56%	0.63%
Native Hawaiian or Pacific Islander alone (NH)	1	4	0.05%	0.17%
Other race alone (NH)	0	16	0.00%	0.68%
Mixed race or Multiracial (NH)	209	240	9.72%	10.15%
Hispanic or Latino (any race)	77	120	3.58%	5.07%
Total	2,150	2,365	100.00%	100.00%

As of the 2020 census, the county had a population of 2,365. The median age was 47.4 years. 22.0% of residents were under the age of 18 and 22.8% of residents were 65 years of age or older. For every 100 females there were 114.0 males, and for every 100 females age 18 and over there were 118.9 males age 18 and over.

The racial makeup of the county was 48.5% White, 0.3% Black or African American, 37.1% American Indian and Alaska Native, 0.7% Asian, 0.2% Native Hawaiian and Pacific Islander, 1.2% from some other race, and 12.0% from two or more races. Hispanic or Latino residents of any race comprised 5.1% of the population.

0.0% of residents lived in urban areas, while 100.0% lived in rural areas.

There were 979 households in the county, of which 28.5% had children under the age of 18 living with them and 18.7% had a female householder with no spouse or partner present. About 28.2% of all households were made up of individuals and 12.8% had someone living alone who was 65 years of age or older.

There were 1,777 housing units, of which 44.9% were vacant. Among occupied housing units, 68.8% were owner-occupied and 31.2% were renter-occupied. The homeowner vacancy rate was 2.8% and the rental vacancy rate was 15.7%.

=== 2000 census ===
As of the census of 2000, there were 3,436 people, 1,369 households, and 866 families residing in the census area. The population density was 0.30 people per square mile (0.12 people/km^{2}). There are 2,108 housing units. The racial makeup of the census area was 58.15% White, 0.15% Black or African American, 35.01% Native American, 0.38% Asian, 0.15% Pacific Islander, 0.96% from other races, and 5.21% from two or more races. 2.82% of the population were Hispanic or Latino of any race. 3.95% reported speaking Tlingit at home, while 1.83% speak Spanish.

There were 1,369 households, out of which 30.80% had children under the age of 18 living with them, 49.30% were married couples living together, 8.40% had a female householder with no husband present, and 36.70% were non-families. 30.10% of all households were made up of individuals, and 5.60% had someone living alone who was 65 years of age or older. The average household size was 2.50 and the average family size was 3.14.

In the census area, the population was spread out, with 26.80% under the age of 18, 7.10% from 18 to 24, 29.50% from 25 to 44, 29.30% from 45 to 64, and 7.30% who were 65 years of age or older. The median age was 38 years. For every 100 females, there were 116.40 males. For every 100 females age 18 and over, there were 120.70 males.

== Politics ==
One of the most Democratic areas in Alaska, the Hoonah-Angoon Census Area has only voted for a Republican for president once (during the 2000 election).

United States presidential election results for Hoonah-Angoon Census Area, Alaska
Year	Republican		Democratic		Third party(ies)	
Year	No.	%	No.	%	No.	%
1960	301	46.52%	346	53.48%	0	0.00%
1964	90	12.95%	605	87.05%	0	0.00%
1968	272	43.38%	322	51.36%	33	5.26%
1972	300	45.25%	346	52.19%	17	2.56%
1976	304	32.90%	563	60.93%	57	6.17%
1980	288	30.09%	517	54.02%	152	15.88%
1984	519	46.88%	550	49.68%	38	3.43%
1988	428	41.96%	532	52.16%	60	5.88%
1992	260	28.17%	407	44.10%	256	27.74%
1996	292	31.16%	432	46.10%	213	22.73%
2000	594	44.16%	539	40.07%	212	15.76%
2004	463	45.80%	494	48.86%	54	5.34%
2008	564	45.45%	636	51.25%	41	3.30%
2012	453	36.10%	743	59.20%	59	4.70%
2016	417	32.91%	639	50.43%	211	16.65%
2020	422	29.53%	950	66.48%	57	3.99%
2024	548	36.17%	876	57.82%	91	6.01%

== Communities ==
=== Cities ===
- Angoon
- Gustavus
- Hoonah
- Pelican
- Tenakee Springs

=== Census-designated places ===
- Elfin Cove
- Game Creek
- Klukwan
- Whitestone Logging Camp

=== Unincorporated community ===
- Cube Cove

== See also ==
- List of airports in the Hoonah-Angoon Census Area
