= Holkham (disambiguation) =

Holkham may refer to:

- Holkham, the civil parish in Norfolk, England
- Holkham Bay, part of the Inside Passage in Alaska
- Holkham Hall, the Palladian home located on the Holkham Estate
- Holkham National Nature Reserve, at Holkham
