= Game Creek, Alaska =

Game Creek, Alaska Xutshéeni
- Census-designated place
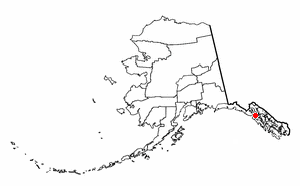
- Location of Game Creek, Alaska
- Coordinates: 58°3′31″N 135°30′47″W
- Country: United States
- State: Alaska
- Census Area: Hoonah-Angoon

Government
  - State senator: Bert Stedman (R)
  - State rep.: Rebecca Himschoot (I)

Area
  - Total: 5.95 sq mi (15.42 km^{2})
  - Land: 5.89 sq mi (15.26 km^{2})
  - Water: 0.062 sq mi (0.16 km^{2})
- Elevation: 548 ft (167 m)

Population (2020)
  - Total: 23
  - Density: 3.9/sq mi (1.51/km^{2})
- Time zone: UTC-9 (Alaska (AKST))
  - Summer (DST): UTC-8 (AKDT)
- Area code: 907
- FIPS code: 02-27700
- GNIS feature ID: 1866948

Game Creek (Lingít: Xutshéeni) is a census-designated place (CDP) on Chichagof Island in Hoonah-Angoon Census Area, Alaska, United States. As of the 2020 census, Game Creek had a population of 23.

== Geography ==
Game Creek is located on the northern side of Chichagof Island at 58°3′31″N 135°30′47″W (58.058694, -135.513082). It lies just southwest of the community of Whitestone Logging Camp and the city of Hoonah. The CDP limits follow the shoreline of Port Frederick on the northwest as far south as Burnt Point. Game Creek, the waterway, forms the eastern edge of the CDP as far north as its mouth in Port Frederick, and the southern limit extends from Burnt Point to Game Creek across an intervening 2,760-foot (840 m) summit.

According to the United States Census Bureau, the CDP has a total area of 5.95 square miles (15.42 km^{2}), of which 5.89 square miles (15.26 km^{2}) are land and 0.062 square miles (0.16 km^{2}), or 1.03%, are water.

== Demographics ==
Historical population
Census	Pop.	Note	%±
1990	61		—
2000	35		−42.6%
2010	18		−48.6%
2020	23		27.8%
U.S. Decennial Census

Game Creek first appeared on the 1990 U.S. Census as an unincorporated census-designated place (CDP).

As of the census of 2000, there were 35 people, 10 households, and 7 families residing in the CDP. The population density was 7.1 inhabitants per square mile (2.7/km^{2}). There were 10 housing units at an average density of 2.0 per square mile (0.77/km^{2}). The racial makeup of the CDP was 88.57% White, and 11.43% from two or more races.

There were 10 households, out of which 40.0% had children under the age of 18 living with them, 50.0% were married couples living together, 10.0% had a female householder with no husband present, and 30.0% were non-families. 20.0% of all households were made up of individuals, and none had someone living alone who was 65 years of age or older. The average household size was 3.50 and the average family size was 4.29.

In the CDP, the population was spread out, with 25.7% under the age of 18, 11.4% from 18 to 24, 28.6% from 25 to 44, 22.9% from 45 to 64, and 11.4% who were 65 years of age or older. The median age was 36 years. For every 100 females, there were 133.3 males. For every 100 females age 18 and over, there were 160.0 males.

The median income for a household in the CDP was $30,833, and the median income for a family was $19,688. Males had a median income of $7,083 versus $0 for females. The per capita income for the CDP was $11,221. There were no families and none of the population living below the poverty line, including no under eighteens and none of those over 64.
