= Whitestone Logging Camp, Alaska =

Whitestone Logging Camp, Alaska Yan Kashada Tináa
- Census-designated place
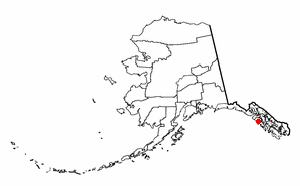
- Location of Whitestone Logging Camp, Alaska
- Coordinates: 58°5′7″N 135°26′54″W
- Country: United States
- State: Alaska
- Census Area: Hoonah-Angoon

Government
  - State senator: Bert Stedman (R)
  - State rep.: Rebecca Himschoot (I)

Area
  - Total: 11.19 sq mi (28.99 km^{2})
  - Land: 10.96 sq mi (28.39 km^{2})
  - Water: 0.23 sq mi (0.60 km^{2})
- Elevation: 276 ft (84 m)

Population (2020)
  - Total: 2
  - Density: 0.18/sq mi (0.07/km^{2})
- Time zone: UTC-9 (Alaska (AKST))
  - Summer (DST): UTC-8 (AKDT)
- Area code: 907
- FIPS code: 02-84200
- GNIS feature ID: 1866976

Whitestone Logging Camp (Lingít: Yan Kashada Tináa) is a census-designated place (CDP) on Chichagof Island in Hoonah-Angoon Census Area, Alaska, United States. As of the 2020 census, Whitestone Logging Camp had a population of 2. It is not to be confused with Whitestone, another CDP in Southeast Fairbanks Census Area.

== Geography ==
Whitestone Logging Camp is located on the northern side of Chichagof Island at 58°5′7″N 135°26′54″W (58.085264, -135.448453). It lies adjacent to the south side of the city of Hoonah. The community of Game Creek lies adjacent to its southwest side.

According to the United States Census Bureau, the CDPp has a total area of 11.0 square miles (28.4 km^{2}), all of it land.

== Demographics ==
Historical population
Census	Pop.	Note	%±
1990	164		—
2000	116		−29.3%
2010	17		−85.3%
2020	2		−88.2%
U.S. Decennial Census

Whitestone Logging Camp first appeared on the 1990 U.S. Census as a census-designated place (CDP).

At the 2000 census, there were 116 people, 36 households and 28 families residing in the CDP. The population density was 11.1 inhabitants per square mile (4.3/km^{2}). There were 45 housing units at an average density of 4.3 per square mile (1.7/km^{2}). The racial makeup of the CDP was 92.24% White, 2.59% Native American, 0.86% Asian, and 4.31% from two or more races.

There were 36 households, of which 52.8% had children under the age of 18 living with them, 63.9% were married couples living together, and 22.2% were non-families. 22.2% of all households were made up of individuals, and 2.8% had someone living alone who was 65 years of age or older. The average household size was 3.00 and the average family size was 3.57.

33.6% of the population were under the age of 18, 9.5% from 18 to 24, 33.6% from 25 to 44, 22.4% from 45 to 64, and 0.9% who were 65 years of age or older. The median age was 30 years. For every 100 females, there were 146.8 males. For every 100 females age 18 and over, there were 165.5 males.

The median household income was $60,625 and the median family income was $64,375. Males had a median income of $72,083 compared with $27,917 for females. The per capita income for the CDP was $21,810. None of the population and none of the families were below the poverty line.

== See also ==
- Logging camp
