= Chuck River Wilderness =

Protected area in Alaska, United States

- IUCN category Ib (wilderness area)
- Location within Alaska Location within North America
- Location: Hoonah-Angoon Census Area, Alaska, USA
- Nearest city: Hobart Bay, Alaska
- Coordinates: 57°28′00″N 133°11′00″W
- Area: 74,298 acres (30,067 ha)
- Established: 1990
- Governing body: U.S. Forest Service

Chuck River Wilderness is a 74,298-acre (30,067 ha) wilderness area located within the Tongass National Forest in the U.S. state of Alaska. It was designated by the United States Congress in 1990.

Located at the head of Windham Bay, Chuck River Wilderness is adjacent to the Tracy Arm-Fords Terror Wilderness. The Chuck River flows northward from its headwaters near Port Houghton through dense forest with thick vegetation before emptying into Windham Bay where the historic Chuck Mining Camp operated until the 1920s. There is private land in the lower river and in portions of the bay where there was once a small settlement.
