= Icy Strait Point =

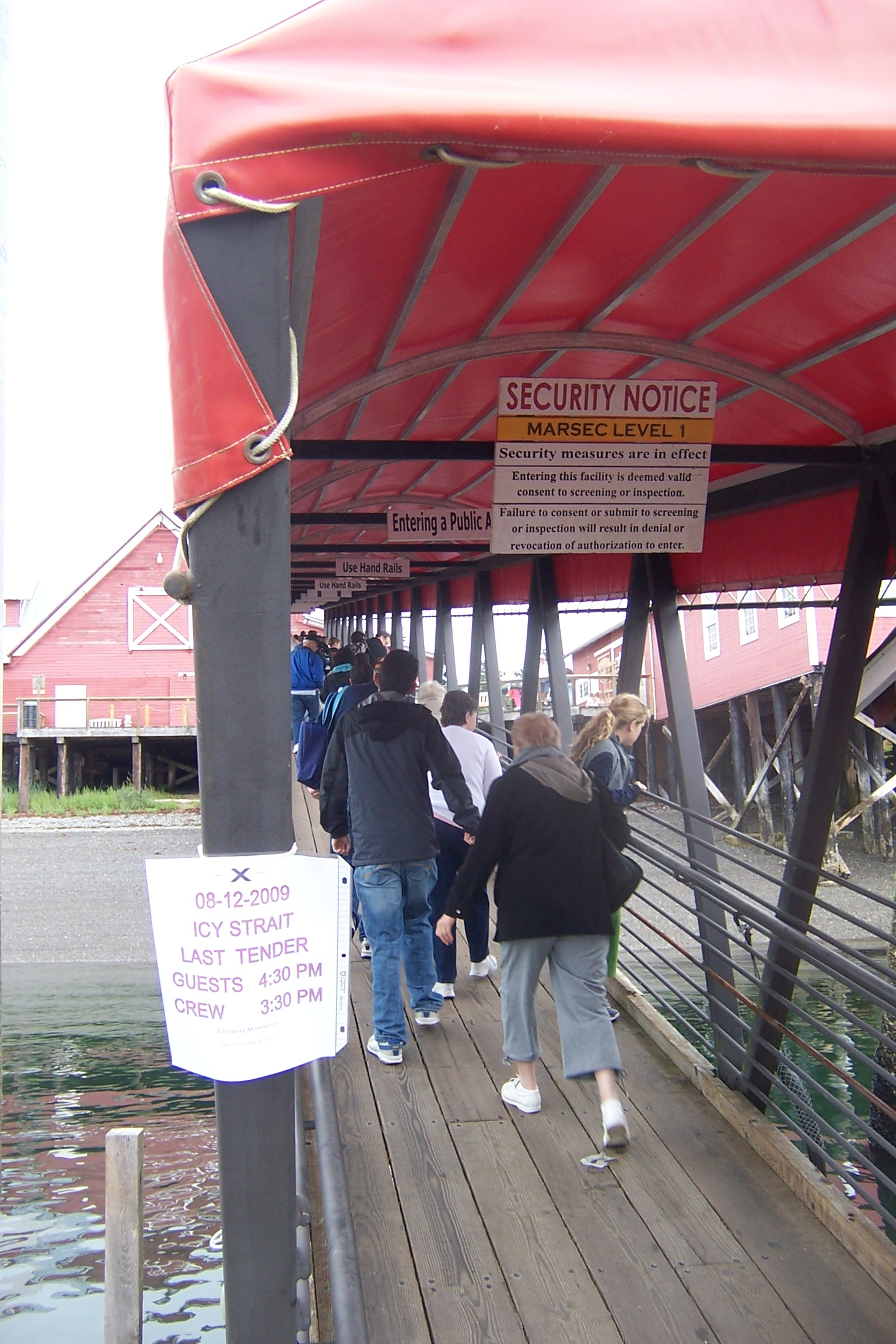
- Cruise ship passengers arrive at Icy Strait Point
- Interactive map of Icy Strait Point

Location
- Country: United States
- Location: 108 Cannery Road, Hoonah, Alaska
- Coordinates: 58.12933°N 135.4632°W

Details
- Opened: 2004
- Owned by: Huna Totem Corporation

Statistics
- Website icystraitpoint.com

Icy Strait Point is a cruise destination located in Hoonah, Alaska, established in 1996 by the Alaskan Native Huna Totem Corporation.

The only privately owned cruise destination in Alaska, it is located on Chichagof Island and named after the nearby Icy Strait.

Huna Totem Corporation is owned by approximately 1,350 Alaskan Natives with aboriginal ties to Hoonah and the Glacier Bay area. Many of them are of the Tlingit people, and "all profits directly [support] the community of Hoonah, Alaska’s largest Native Tlingit village".

As of 2024, 85% of its staff live in Hoonah.

== History ==
Huna Totem Corporation was established as a part of the Alaska Native Claims Settlement Act signed into law in 1971. The Act was intended to resolve the long-standing issues surrounding aboriginal land claims in Alaska, as well as to stimulate economic development throughout Alaska.

The corporation purchased the site in 1996, and Icy Strait Point was first opened for cruise ships in 2004, with Royal Caribbean International and its sister outfit Celebrity Cruises being the two lines to initially make use of it. They would continue to be the main lines there, but subsequently Princess Cruises began making some stops there for several years, as well as Oceania Cruises, Regent Seven Seas Cruises, Norwegian Cruise Line, Disney Cruise Line, and Virgin Voyages.

By 2008, cruise stop business accounted for a quarter of Hoonah's employment, and by 2011, there were some 73 cruise ship visits arriving for the summer season, and by one calculation the cruise business accounted for more than half the local economy.

Initially passengers were tendered into the Icy Strait Point dock, then in 2016 construction was finished on a 400-foot (120 m) floating dock suitable for cruise ships that replaced tendering. By 2019, there were 137 cruise ships scheduled to visit Icy Strait Point. But still only one cruise ship was present at any given time.

To further expand the tourism business, in 2019, Huna Totem Corporation joined with Norwegian Cruise Line to build a second floating dock, one that could accommodate megaships, located a half mile away from the first. The goal of the separation was to prevent overcrowding, but nevertheless some Hoonah Elders expressed skepticism that the local population could handle that amount of tourist traffic without losing its sense of character.

In 2020, Icy Strait Point was hit by the effects of the COVID-19 pandemic on cruise ships. Nevertheless, work on the second dock work went forward and was completed by 2022, although the effects of the pandemic were still being felt.

In 2021, on June 13, Kléet Plaza was dedicated. "Kléet" is from the Tlingit language meaning orca. It features a life-sized bronze orca sculpture by Robert Wyland, donated by Norwegian Cruise Line to Huna Totem Corporation.

In 2024, there were about 240 cruise ship visits to Icy Strait Point, bringing about 500,000 tourists, of whom about 35,000 visit Hoonah.

== Description ==
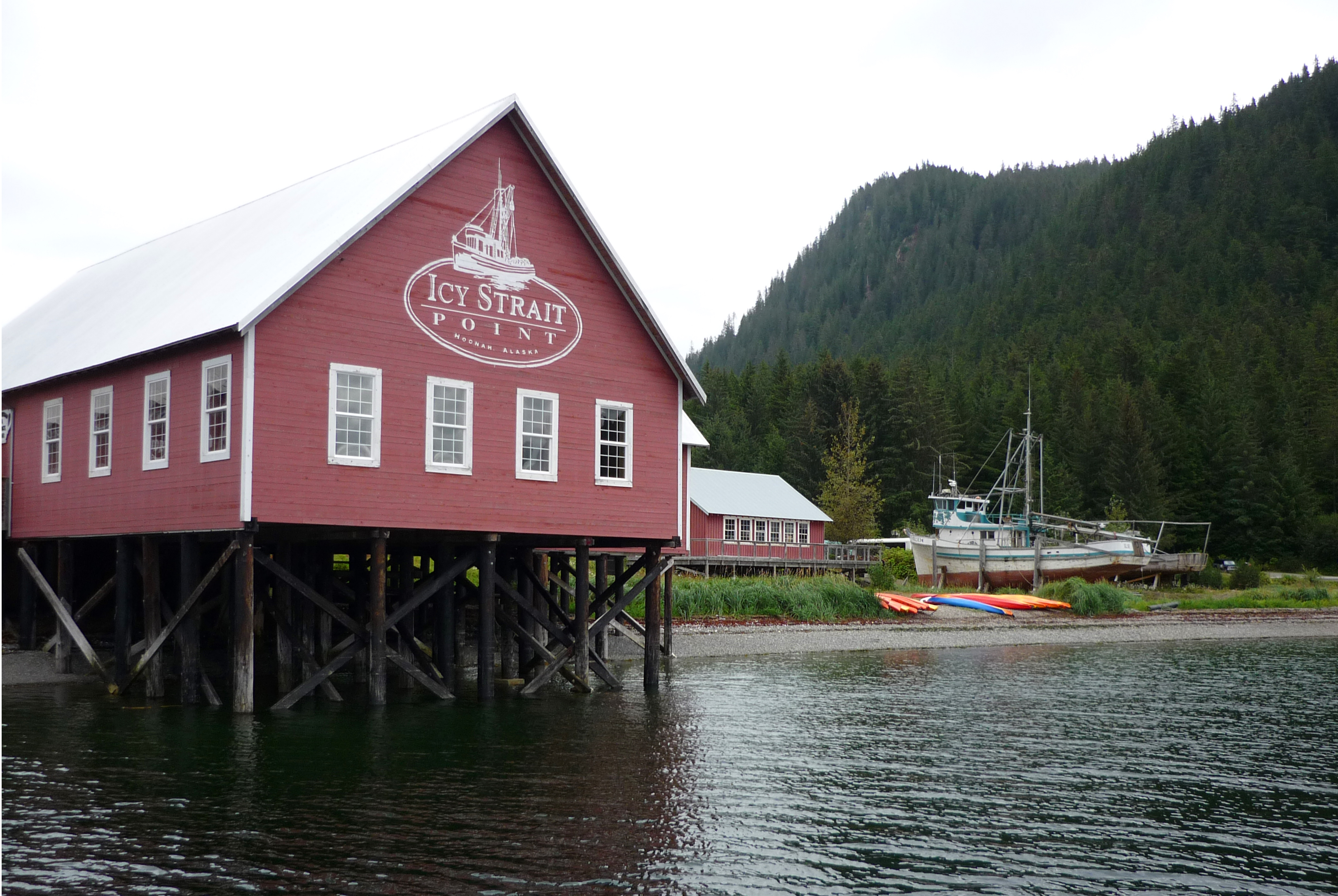
Icy Strait Point

The corporation's goal was to preserve the character of the local village and culture as much as possible, despite the influx of visitors, while still providing substantial help to local economic prospects. They have won several awards for doing this, including in 2008 a Travel to a Better World Award from National Geographic Traveler magazine, in 2012 a Global Vision Award from Travel + Leisure magazine, and in 2013 a finalist World Savers Award from Condé Nast Traveler magazine. A decade later, The New York Times put Hoonah and Icy Strait Point on its '52 Places to Go in 2022' list, a group of selections that year that emphasized sites that fostered sustainable tourism and avoided overtourism.

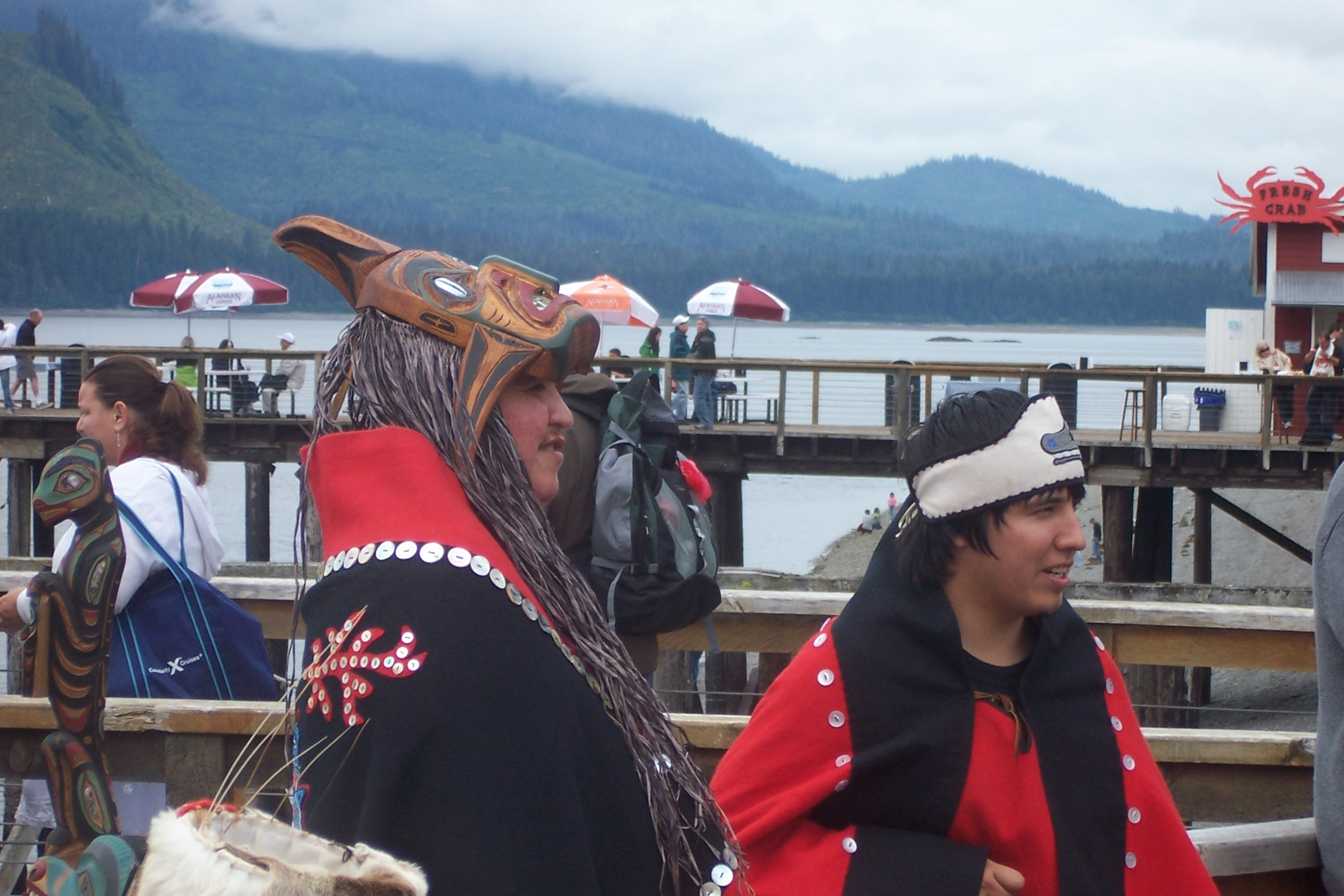
Tlingit-garbed people and items mingle with cruise ship passengers in 2009

The site includes the 1930s Hoonah Packing Company facility, now converted into a museum, restaurant, and shops. In the view of two travel books, the cannery at the site has been "beautifully restored". At the dock, traditionally garbed presenters offer a look at Huna Tlingit culture, and an indoor theatrical production along the same lines is also offered. All shops located there are owned by Alaskans. Alaska's Wildest Kitchen shows visitors the importance of salmon and subsistence fishing in the Tlingit culture and features a culinary instruction space where local residents demonstrate how to fillet salmon and halibut and turn them into burgers, spreads, casseroles, and grilled entrees. The local town of Hoonah is a mile's walk, and reveals contemporary Tlingit life. A 2014 USA Today article described the chance to experience Alaska Native culture in small villages such as Hoonah one of the ten reasons to visit the state.

For the most part, however, Icy Strait Point is a jumping-off point for shore excursions for the cruise passengers. The most well-known of these is the ZipRider zip-line that completes its run near the facility, which was constructed by the Huna Totem Corporation. Opening in May 2007, it measures 5,330 feet (1,620 m) and made claims to being the longest in the world, or later to at least being one of the longest and highest – at 1,330 feet (410 m) – in North America. It has been rated a statewide "must do" attraction by the Anchorage Daily News. The zip-line was also featured in September 2013 on Travel Channel's Ride-iculous show.

Another popular excursion is to search for coastal brown bears on the nearby Spasski River, where sightings happen but are not guaranteed. Other wildlife, such as bald eagles, are frequently seen in the area.

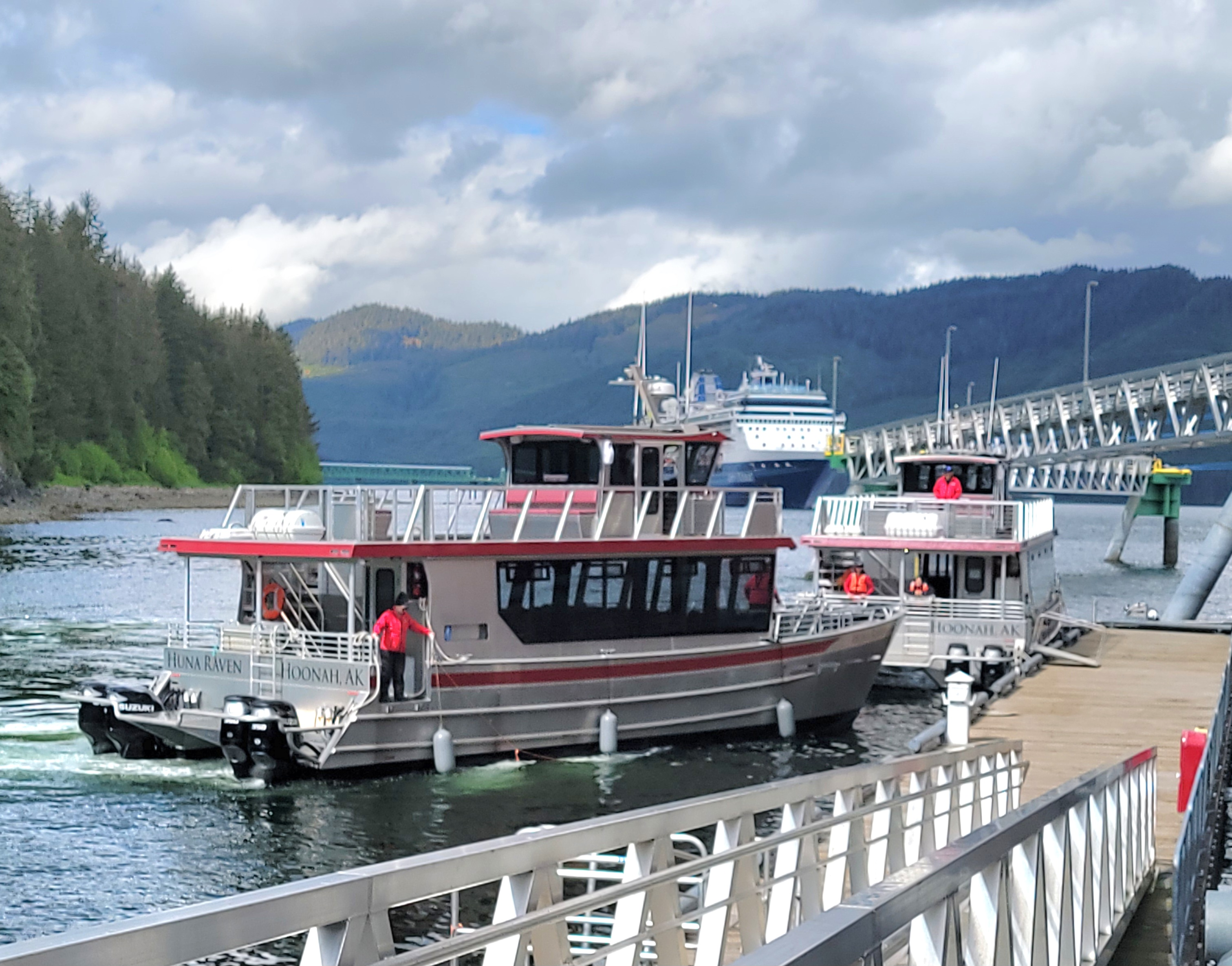
Whale watching boats at Icy Strait Point

Whale watching excursions are also conducted, as the facility is near the Point Adolphus feeding area for humpback whales. By 2011, attractions at and around Icy Strait Point had reached the level where they were getting non-cruise visitors as well.

== Gallery ==
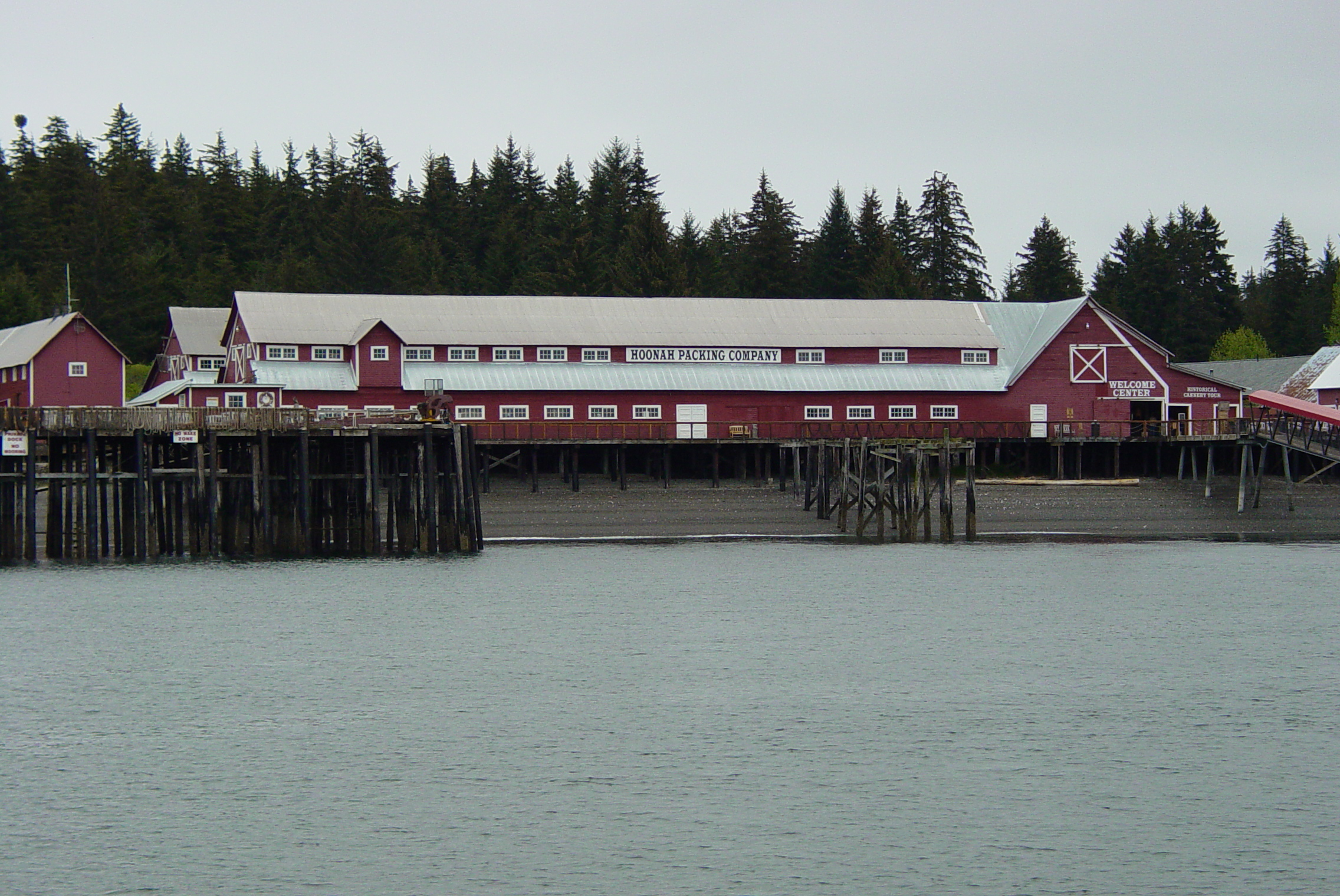
The Hoonah Packing Company facility in 2006, now converted into a museum, restaurant, and shops

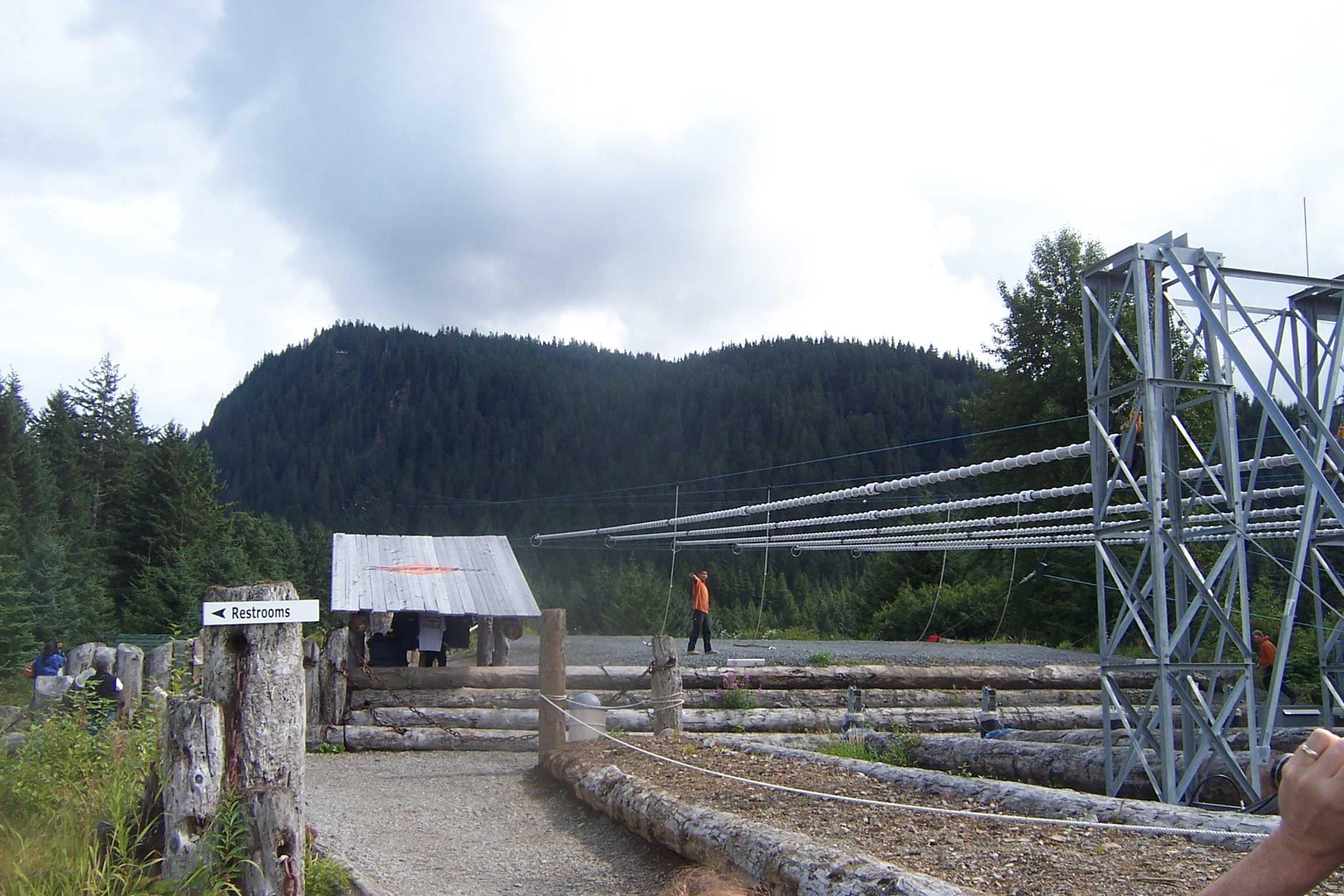
The zip line, 2009

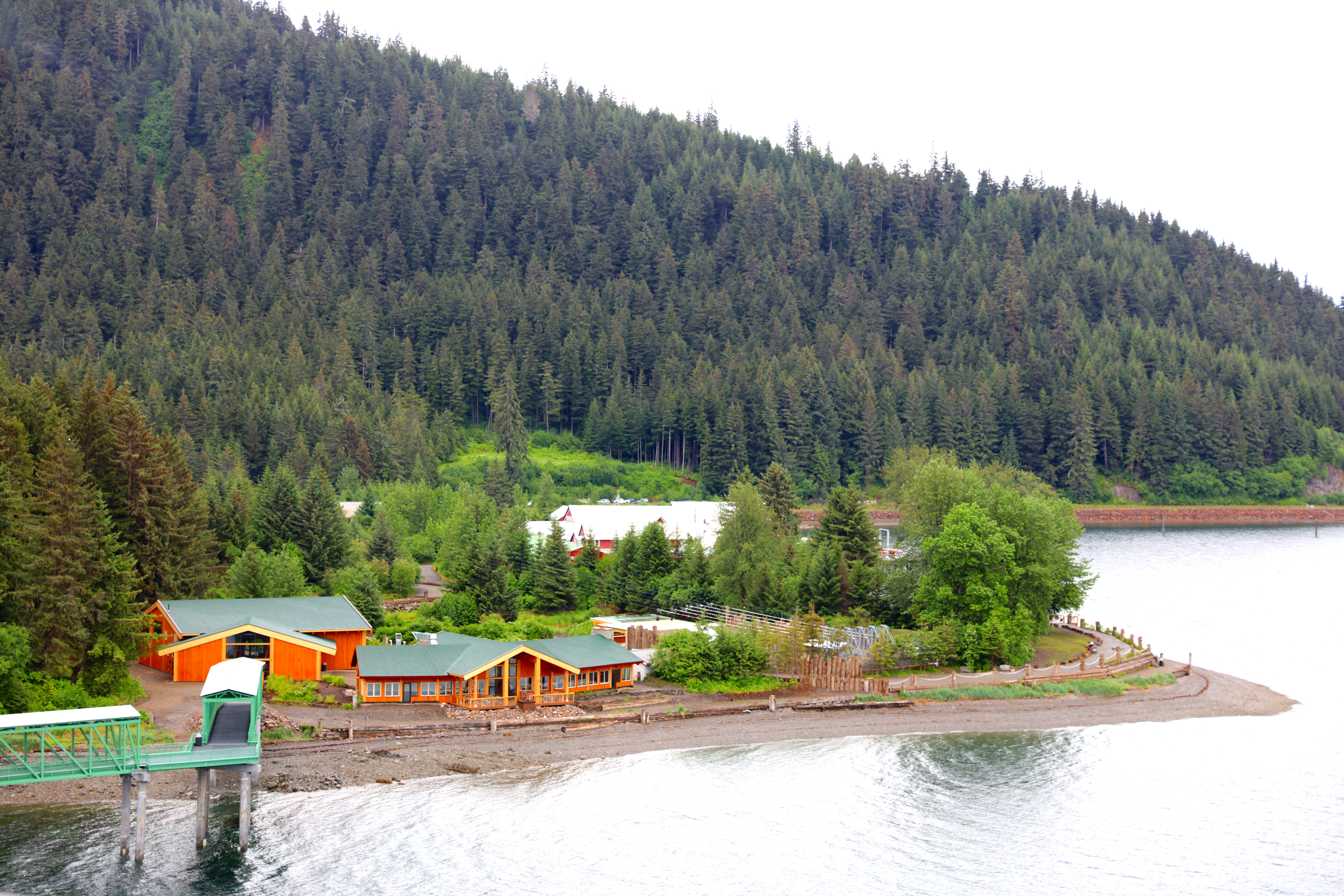
Wide view of Icy Strait Point, 2016
