= Whitestone, Alaska =

Unincorporated community in the state of Alaska, United States

- Census-designated Place
- Location within Alaska
- Coordinates: 64°09′10″N 145°54′23″W
- Country: United States
- State: Alaska
- Census Area: Southeast Fairbanks

Government
  - State senator: Click Bishop (R)
  - State rep.: Mike Cronk (R)

Area
  - Total: 7.04 sq mi (18.24 km^{2})
  - Land: 7.04 sq mi (18.24 km^{2})
  - Water: 0 sq mi (0.00 km^{2})
- Elevation: 984 ft (300 m)

Population (2020)
  - Total: 71
  - Density: 10.1/sq mi (3.89/km^{2})
- Time zone: UTC-9 (Alaska (AKST))
  - Summer (DST): UTC-8 (AKDT)
- ZIP code: 99737
- Area code: 907
- GNIS feature ID: 2582719

Whitestone is an unincorporated community and census-designated place in Southeast Fairbanks Census Area, Alaska, United States. Its population was 71 as of the 2020 census. This is not to be confused with Whitestone Logging Camp CDP in the Alaskan panhandle.

== Geography ==
According to the U.S. Census Bureau, the community has an area of 7.065 square miles (18.30 km^{2}), all of it land.

== Demographics ==
Historical population
| Census | Pop. | Note | %± |
|---|---|---|---|
| 2010 | 97 | | — |
| 2020 | 71 | | −26.8% |
U.S. Decennial Census

Whitestone first appeared on the 2010 U.S. Census as a census-designated place (CDP).
