= Hoonah, Alaska =

Town in Alaska

Hoonah, Alaska Xunaa / Gaaw Yat’aḵ Aan
- City
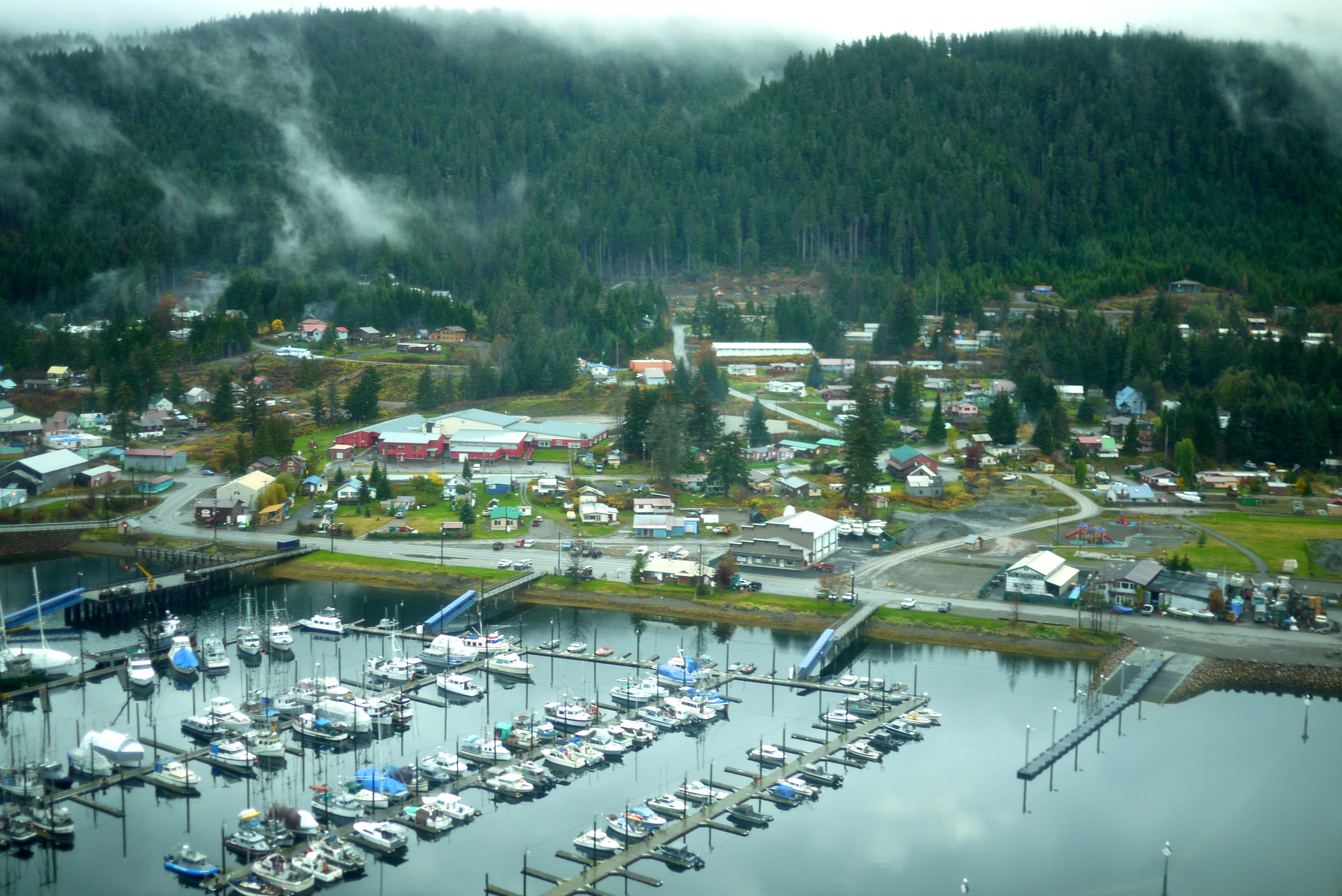
- Aerial photo of Hoonah

- Location in Alaska
- Coordinates: 58°06′34″N 135°26′11″W
- Country: United States
- State: Alaska
- Census Area: Hoonah-Angoon
- Incorporated: June 8, 1946

Government
  - Mayor: Bill Miller
  - State senator: Bert Stedman (R)
  - State rep.: Rebecca Himschoot (I)

Area
  - Total: 7.13 sq mi (18.47 km^{2})
  - Land: 5.87 sq mi (15.20 km^{2})
  - Water: 1.27 sq mi (3.28 km^{2})
- Elevation: 52 ft (16 m)

Population (2020)
  - Total: 931
  - Density: 159/sq mi (61.2/km^{2})
- Time zone: UTC-9 (Alaska (AKST))
  - Summer (DST): UTC-8 (AKDT)
- ZIP code: 99829
- Area code: 907
- FIPS code: 02-33360
- GNIS feature ID: 1403488
- Website: www.cityofhoonah.org

Hoonah (Tlingit: Xunaa or Gaaw Yat’aḵ Aan) is a largely Tlingit community on Chichagof Island, located in Alaska's panhandle in the southeast region of the state. It is 30 miles (48 km) west of Juneau, across the Alaskan Inside Passage. Hoonah is the only first-class city on Chichagof Island, the 109th-largest island in the world and the 5th-largest island in the U.S. At the 2020 census the population was 931, up from 760 in 2010. In the summer the population can swell to over 1,300 depending on fishing, boating, hiking and hunting conditions.

"Hoonah" became the official spelling in 1901, with establishment of the Hoonah branch of the United States Post Office. "Hoonah" is the approximate pronunciation of the Tlingit name Xunaa, which means “lee of the north wind”, i.e., protected from the north wind.

== History ==
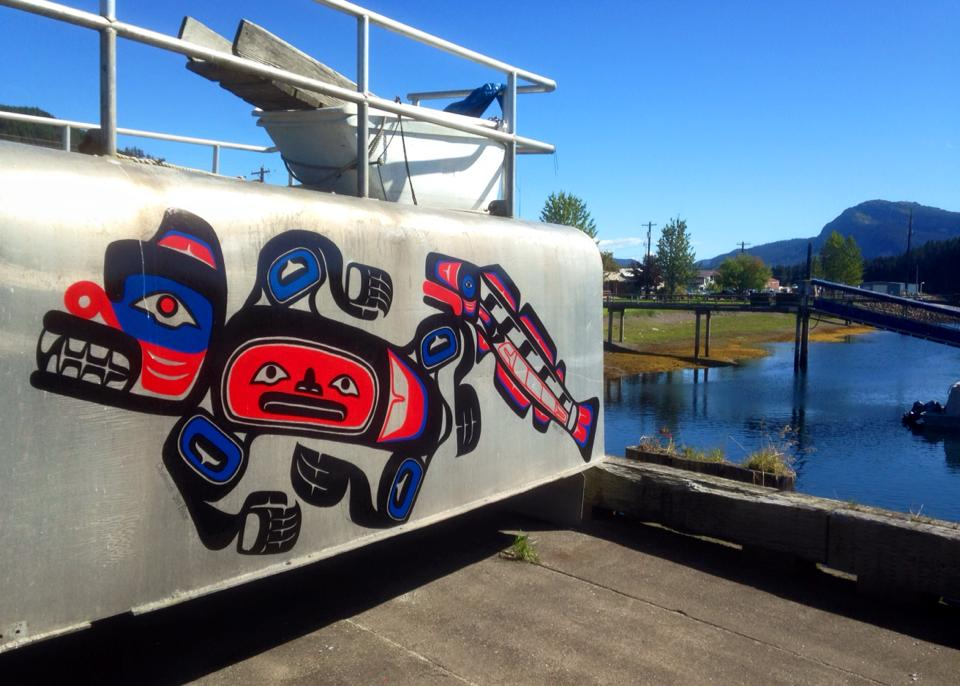
Native art at the dock in Hoonah

The clans comprising the Huna Tlingit originally settled what is now Glacier Bay National Park as well as Icy Strait, Cross Sound, and the outer coast north to Sea Otter Creek. Two catastrophic events forced the Tlingit from their homeland: rapid glacial advance in Glacier Bay and a landslide-induced tsunami in Lituya Bay along the outer coast. Tlingit oral tradition recounts these events as well as the clans' ultimate resettlement in Xunaa.

A partial timeline of modern Hoonah history is below:

- 1750s - Xunaa was settled by clans fleeing glacial advance in Glacier Bay.
- 1880 - The North West Trading Company built the first store in Hoonah.
- 1881 - The Presbyterian Home Mission and school was built.
- 1887 - 450 to 500 people were wintering in the village.
- 1901 - Hoonah post office was opened.
- 1912 - The Hoonah Packing Co. built a large cannery north of town. The cannery was shut down after decades of use and is now a tourist attraction at Icy Strait Point.
- 1934, 1936 - Hoonah Indian Association was constituted as a federally recognized tribe, authorized to act on behalf of the Huna Tlingit.
- 1944 - A fire destroyed much of Hoonah, including many priceless Tlingit cultural objects. The United States federal government assisted in rebuilding Hoonah.
- 1953 - Last year that Icy Strait Salmon Company operated as a full-fledged canning operation. From this point until 1999 the property functioned as a maintenance and support facility for the seine boat fishing fleet.
- 1964 - First graduating class from Hoonah High School, in May.
- 2001 - Groundbreaking ceremony for Icy Strait Point, at abandoned Hoonah Packing Company site.
- 2004 - Celebrity MV Mercury makes inaugural call at Icy Strait Point.
- 2007 - ZipRider! The world's largest zipline opens at Icy Strait Point.
- 2010 - Alaska State Troopers assisted Hoonah police in a 2-day manhunt for a man who was reported to be armed in a wooded area in the city. He was later apprehended without incident.
- 2010 - A fire and subsequent series of explosions destroyed the Icy Strait Lumber Mill. No criminal activity was suspected in the fire.
- 2010 - Two police officers from the city were shot and killed in an ambush on Front Street. The suspect subsequently barricaded himself inside his own home on August 29, 2010. State, local and federal law enforcement officers and SWAT personnel from agencies throughout Alaska responded in the wake of the shooting. The suspect, John Marvin, was taken into custody the next day.

The town of Hoonah is featured on the Discovery Channel show Alaskan Bush People.

=== Education and schools ===
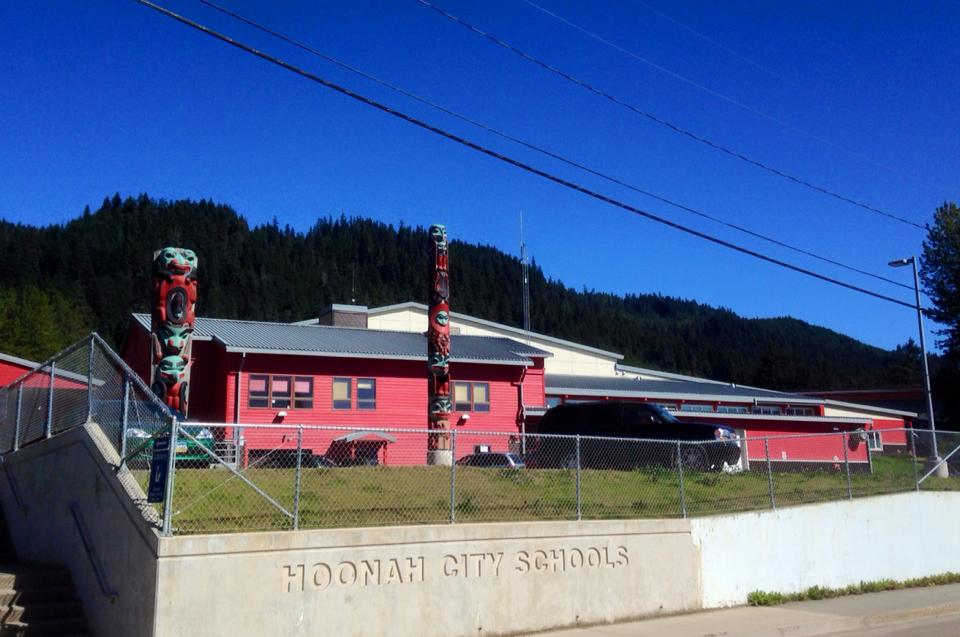
Hoonah City Schools

Sheldon Jackson established the first school house and teacher's residence in November 1881. The school was initially overseen by Mr. and Mrs. Walter B. Styles of New York until their transfer to Sitka in 1882. The Reverend and Mrs. John McFarland assumed responsibility for the school in 1884, and by 1885 219 Tlingit students were enrolled: 69 boys, 76 girls and 74 adults. A territorial school and government school were built in 1923. In 1932 the government school was demolished and replaced by a Bureau of Indian Affairs school.

Hoonah City Schools currently serves the needs of Hoonah's elementary and secondary students. Six graduating seniors made up the Hoonah City Schools class of 2015.

=== Hoonah Packing Company ===
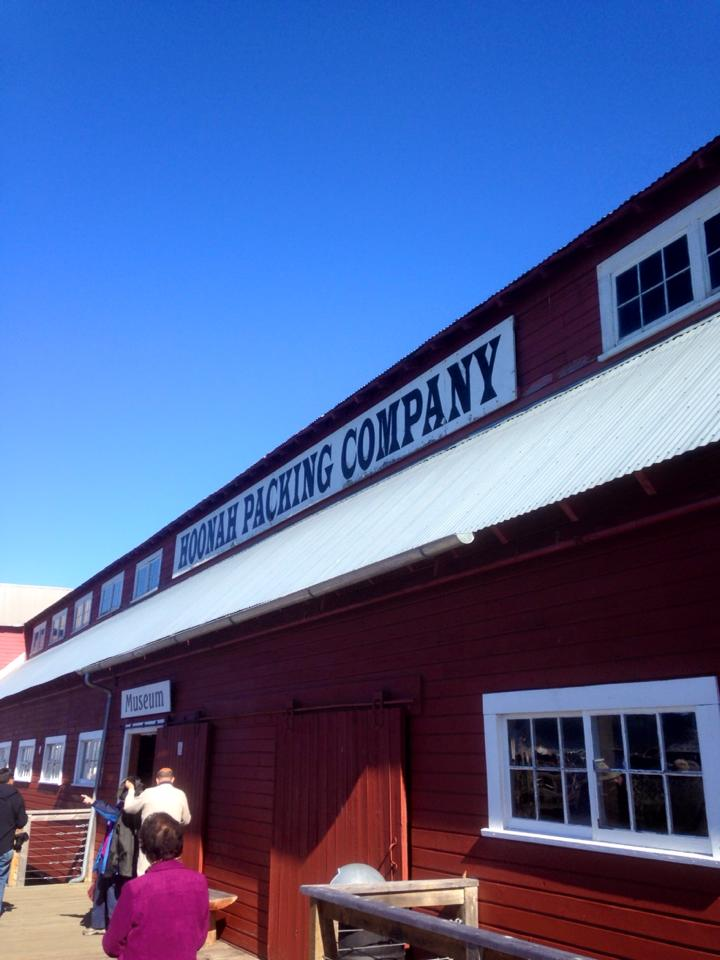
The Hoonah Packing Company building at Icy Strait Point, now used as a tourist destination for cruise ships

The Hoonah Packing Company ("HPC"), built in 1912, was one of eight canneries operating in the area during the early twentieth century, representing Hoonah's major industry at the time. HPC was sold several times until coming to be owned by Wards Cove Packing, which also owned Hoonah Trading. The cannery ceased operating in 1954, but continued to see use by commercial fishermen for storing and repairing their boats and gear.

== Geography ==
Hoonah is on the north shore of Chichagof Island, on Icy Strait, at 58°6′34″N 135°26′11″W (58.109435, -135.436349). The communities of Whitestone Logging Camp (which was being dismantled in early 2011) and Game Creek just south of the city limits. The port at Hoonah is called Port Frederick. Other incorporated communities nearby on Chichagof Island include Tenakee Springs to the south and Pelican to the west. A study began in 2009 regarding the feasibility of a road from Hoonah to Pelican and possibly connecting to Tenakee Springs to allow an energy corridor to hot spring thermal energy sources in the region for Hoonah, to lower heating and energy costs. Most Tenakee residents expressed opposition to the road, while Pelican has generally supported the idea. The road would save the Alaska Department of Transportation ferry costs in summer snow-free months, by connecting these areas to Hoonah.

According to the United States Census Bureau, the city of Hoonah has a total area of 7.3 square miles (18.9 km^{2}), of which 6.0 square miles (15.6 km^{2}) are land and 1.3 square miles (3.3 km^{2}), or 17.59%, are water.

Tongass National Forest borders the area and has an unpaved road system of over 300 miles (480 km). Recreation areas include Game Creek, Kennel Creek, and Freshwater Bay which has a small boat harbor, all to the east; and Whitestone boat landing and False Bay recreation area to the southeast. These areas are inaccessible in winter due to deep snow.

== Climate ==
According to the Köppen climate classification system, Hoonah has a humid continental climate (Dfb), or an oceanic climate (Cfb) depending on the isotherm used.

Climate data for Hoonah, Alaska (1991–2020 normals, extremes 1941–present)
Month	Jan	Feb	Mar	Apr	May	Jun	Jul	Aug	Sep	Oct	Nov	Dec	Year
Record high °F (°C)	61 (16)	50 (10)	59 (15)	72 (22)	78 (26)	86 (30)	86 (30)	86 (30)	78 (26)	62 (17)	56 (13)	55 (13)	86 (30)
Mean maximum °F (°C)	45.7 (7.6)	45.0 (7.2)	48.8 (9.3)	59.4 (15.2)	71.2 (21.8)	76.5 (24.7)	77.8 (25.4)	76.6 (24.8)	67.1 (19.5)	56.8 (13.8)	47.5 (8.6)	44.7 (7.1)	80.5 (26.9)
Mean daily maximum °F (°C)	34.4 (1.3)	36.7 (2.6)	39.9 (4.4)	48.5 (9.2)	57.5 (14.2)	62.3 (16.8)	64.5 (18.1)	64.4 (18.0)	57.7 (14.3)	48.1 (8.9)	39.0 (3.9)	35.6 (2.0)	49.1 (9.5)
Daily mean °F (°C)	30.6 (−0.8)	31.7 (−0.2)	34.1 (1.2)	41.0 (5.0)	48.6 (9.2)	54.6 (12.6)	57.8 (14.3)	57.4 (14.1)	51.3 (10.7)	42.9 (6.1)	35.0 (1.7)	31.9 (−0.1)	43.1 (6.1)
Mean daily minimum °F (°C)	26.7 (−2.9)	26.7 (−2.9)	28.4 (−2.0)	33.4 (0.8)	39.8 (4.3)	46.9 (8.3)	51.0 (10.6)	50.5 (10.3)	44.9 (7.2)	37.7 (3.2)	31.0 (−0.6)	28.3 (−2.1)	37.1 (2.8)
Mean minimum °F (°C)	13.0 (−10.6)	15.7 (−9.1)	16.6 (−8.6)	24.9 (−3.9)	31.3 (−0.4)	39.0 (3.9)	44.5 (6.9)	43.1 (6.2)	34.9 (1.6)	28.4 (−2.0)	19.6 (−6.9)	15.4 (−9.2)	7.7 (−13.5)
Record low °F (°C)	3 (−16)	0 (−18)	6 (−14)	13 (−11)	27 (−3)	31 (−1)	32 (0)	30 (−1)	22 (−6)	22 (−6)	2 (−17)	1 (−17)	0 (−18)
Average precipitation inches (mm)	6.75 (171)	5.02 (128)	4.43 (113)	3.13 (80)	2.51 (64)	2.67 (68)	3.30 (84)	4.86 (123)	7.26 (184)	9.19 (233)	8.81 (224)	7.86 (200)	65.79 (1,671)
Average snowfall inches (cm)	25.0 (64)	12.3 (31)	20.0 (51)	1.7 (4.3)	0.0 (0.0)	0.0 (0.0)	0.0 (0.0)	0.0 (0.0)	0.0 (0.0)	0.6 (1.5)	13.4 (34)	17.0 (43)	90.0 (229)
Average extreme snow depth inches (cm)	15.3 (39)	15.6 (40)	15.4 (39)	5.0 (13)	0.0 (0.0)	0.0 (0.0)	0.0 (0.0)	0.0 (0.0)	0.0 (0.0)	0.4 (1.0)	8.7 (22)	12.9 (33)	25.7 (65)
Average precipitation days (≥ 0.01 in)	19.5	15.8	15.7	16.9	14.7	16.0	17.8	19.3	21.6	23.7	20.1	21.0	222.1
Average snowy days	8.1	5.9	6.5	1.0	0.0	0.0	0.0	0.0	0.0	0.3	5.2	8.0	35.0
Source: NOAA

== Demographics ==
Historical population
Census	Pop.	Note	%±
1880	800		—
1890	438		−45.2%
1900	447		2.1%
1910	462		3.4%
1920	402		−13.0%
1930	514		27.9%
1940	716		39.3%
1950	563		−21.4%
1960	686		21.8%
1970	748		9.0%
1980	680		−9.1%
1990	795		16.9%
2000	860		8.2%
2010	760		−11.6%
2020	931		22.5%
U.S. Decennial Census

Hoonah first reported on the 1880 U.S. Census as the Tlingit settlement of Koudekan. It reported as "Huna" on the 1890 U.S. Census. It next appeared on the 1900 U.S. Census as "Hooniah." From 1910 onwards, it appeared as Hoonah. It formally incorporated in 1946.

Hoonah is the principal village for the Huna Tlingit who originally settled Glacier Bay, Icy Strait, Cross Sound, and the Outer Coast. The four original Tlingit clans present are Chookaneidi, T'aakdeintaan, Wooshkeetaan, and Kaagwaantaan. Numerous other clans migrated to, or married into, the community, as have non-native peoples.

=== 2020 census ===
As of the 2020 census, Hoonah had a population of 931. The median age was 41.8 years. 25.3% of residents were under the age of 18 and 19.7% of residents were 65 years of age or older. For every 100 females there were 125.4 males, and for every 100 females age 18 and over there were 124.2 males age 18 and over.

0.0% of residents lived in urban areas, while 100.0% lived in rural areas.

There were 347 households in Hoonah, of which 32.0% had children under the age of 18 living in them. Of all households, 37.8% were married-couple households, 32.9% were households with a male householder and no spouse or partner present, and 17.6% were households with a female householder and no spouse or partner present. About 27.4% of all households were made up of individuals and 12.4% had someone living alone who was 65 years of age or older.

There were 398 housing units, of which 12.8% were vacant. The homeowner vacancy rate was 1.9% and the rental vacancy rate was 9.9%.

Racial composition as of the 2020 census
Race	Number	Percent
White	308	33.1%
Black or African American	1	0.1%
American Indian and Alaska Native	455	48.9%
Asian	3	0.3%
Native Hawaiian and Other Pacific Islander	3	0.3%
Some other race	16	1.7%
Two or more races	145	15.6%
Hispanic or Latino (of any race)	61	6.6%

=== 2000 census ===
As of the census of 2000, there were 860 people, 300 households, and 215 families residing in the city. The population density was 130.2 inhabitants per square mile (50.3/km^{2}). There were 348 housing units at an average density of 52.7 per square mile (20.3/km^{2}). The racial makeup of the city was 28.72% White, 0.23% Black or African American, 60.58% Native American, 0.12% Asian, 0.81% from other races, and 9.53% from two or more races. 3.60% of the population were Hispanic or Latino of any race.

There were 300 households, out of which 33.7% had children under the age of 18 living with them, 52.3% were married couples living together, 12.3% had a female householder with no husband present, and 28.3% were non-families. 22.7% of all households were made up of individuals, and 5.0% had someone living alone who was 65 years of age or older. The average household size was 2.83 and the average family size was 3.34.

In the city, the age distribution of the population shows 29.2% under the age of 18, 9.4% from 18 to 24, 26.5% from 25 to 44, 27.3% from 45 to 64, and 7.6% who were 65 years of age or older. The median age was 36 years. For every 100 females, there were 112.9 males. For every 100 females age 18 and over, there were 115.2 males.

The median income for a household in the city was $39,028, and the median income for a family was $45,125. Males had a median income of $37,083 versus $23,958 for females. The per capita income for the city was $16,097. About 14.3% of families and 16.6% of the population were below the poverty line, including 14.1% of those under age 18 and 10.4% of those age 65 or over.

=== Economy ===
The old fish cannery, which ceased operations in the 1950s, located near Icy Strait, was obtained by the Huna Totem Corporation (HTC), the village ANCSA Corporation. The road to the site, Cannery Road, was paved in 2000 and the site was converted into a tourism destination for cruise ship passengers. From May to September, cruise ships anchor off Icy Strait Point, and visits from ship passengers enhance Hoonah's warm-weather economy weekly. The former Hoonah Air Force Station, once a White Alice Communications System facility during the Cold War, which closed in the mid-1970s, is now the start point of a zip-line, one of the longest in the world, which ends at the cannery site. The cruise ship passengers, visiting fishing vessels, and summertime boaters who dock in the Hoonah city small boat harbor, all bring revenue to the city. The closing of the logging industry in southeast Alaska hurt the town economically in the early 1990s, but limited logging, tourism and fishing have helped to replace the void.

Hunters, hikers, campers, boaters and fishers all visit Hoonah as tourists throughout the year. The mild weather, much like that of Seattle, attracts tourists to the city.

== Transportation ==
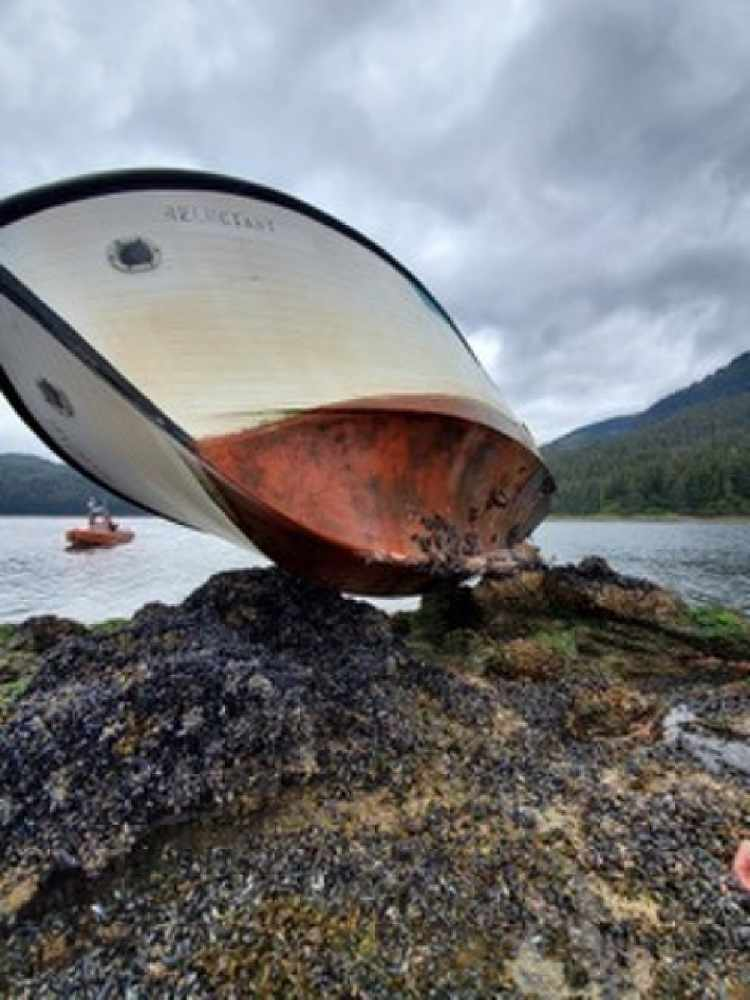
The John F. Middleton rescued the crew of the stranded fishing vessel Reluctant on September 23, 2020.

Hoonah, being an island community, is only accessible by boat or plane.

=== Ferry ===
The Alaska Marine Highway serves Hoonah with the M/V LeConte with recent gaps in coverage due to state funding and needed repair work. The ferry service has traditionally offered residents a slower but more dependable and cheaper option to travel to and from Hoonah to Juneau.

The city of Hoonah operates a small boat harbor, a large vessel mooring harbor and a new boat haul-out facility. The Alaska Department of Transportation built a new ferry facility that opened in early 2001 in Hoonah.

=== Airport ===
The Hoonah Airport was expanded in 2011 and now has a 3,000-foot (910 m) runway. The airport is planned for expansion to better allow military C-130s from the Coast Guard and Air National Guard to land in Hoonah.

The airport offers service via bush carrier Alaska Seaplanes which offers multiple flights a day between Hoonah and Juneau and other local communities. Connections can be made in Juneau with Alaska Airlines for regional and interstate travel or to other bush carriers traveling to remote villages or communities from Juneau.

== Infrastructure ==
Hoonah has a K-12 school with approximately 120 students. There are two grocery stores, a fuel dealership, hardware store, bar, hotel and restaurant-bar, two cafes, an auto service center, several gift shops, several bed and breakfasts, a U.S. post office, a regional U.S. Forest Service office for Tongass National Forest, a fish processing facility, and a sporting goods store. In 2015, a local brewery was established under the name Hoonah Brewing Company. Plans are underway to build a new jail.

The city is an Alaskan first class city and provides all municipal services including police, utilities and road maintenance. The city also maintains a city park, built in 2010 near the harbor, and a youth activity center.

The police department has a five-bed jail and employs four paid police officers, along with volunteer reserve officers. The Hoonah volunteer Emergency Medical Service (EMS) was recognized by the state of Alaska in 2009 for excellence, and the Hoonah Volunteer Fire Department was accredited by the Alaska Fire Commission in 2010. The Alaska State Troopers have an office post in Hoonah, with one "brown shirt" wildlife enforcement trooper-pilot posted there.

The Alaska Courts maintain a court house in Hoonah for district court, presided over by a magistrate.

The Hoonah Indian Association maintains a tribal office, a senior citizens center and other services to local tribal members.

== Health care ==
The SEARHC Hoonah Health Center (or SEARHC Hoonah Medical Center) is the primary health clinic in the community. Its senior staff are Physician Assistants and Nurse Practitioners. The facility operates as part of the Southeast Alaska Regional Health Consortium (or SEARHC). It is open Monday through Friday for primary care and acute concerns, and offers assistance after hours in emergency situations. In the summer of 2015, the health center was moved to a new, larger facility. Bartlett Regional Hospital in Juneau, roughly 40 miles away (or an approximately 20 minute flight), is the nearest hospital. Because no roads lead in or out of Hoonah, individuals in need of dire medical attention are often airlifted to Juneau or Sitka via air ambulance or Coast Guard helicopter. The community is also served by local Emergency Medical Service. The volunteer EMS team retains two fully functioning ambulances as well as a modified ambulance for off-road emergencies.

== Religion ==
Hoonah has eight churches:

- Sacred Heart Parish (Roman Catholic)
- St. Nicholas Eastern Orthodox Church
- Harbor of Faith Lutheran Church
- Hoonah United Presbyterian Church (ECO)
- Abundant Life Christian Fellowship (Assemblies of God)
- Hoonah Pentecostal Church (United Pentecostal)
- The Salvation Army Corps, Center for Worship and Service
- Hoonah Baptist Fellowship

== Bibliography ==
- Dombrowski, Kirk (2001) Against Culture: Development, Politics, and Religion in Indian Alaska. Lincoln: University of Nebraska Press.
