= Holkham Bay =

Bay in Alaska, United States

- Sumdum Bay
- Sum Dum (Tlingit)
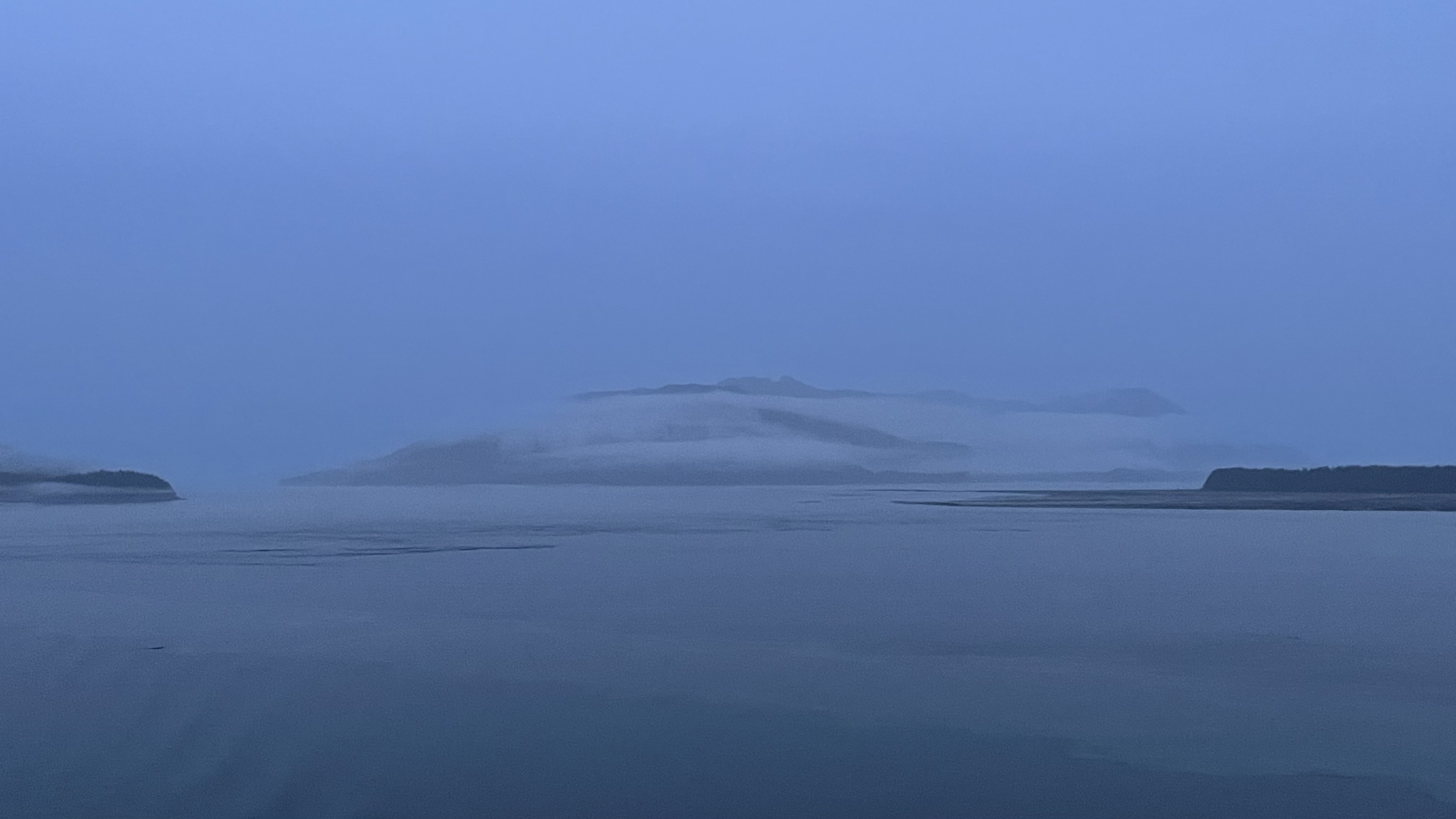
- Holkham Bay and nearby mountains in the Chuck River Wilderness.

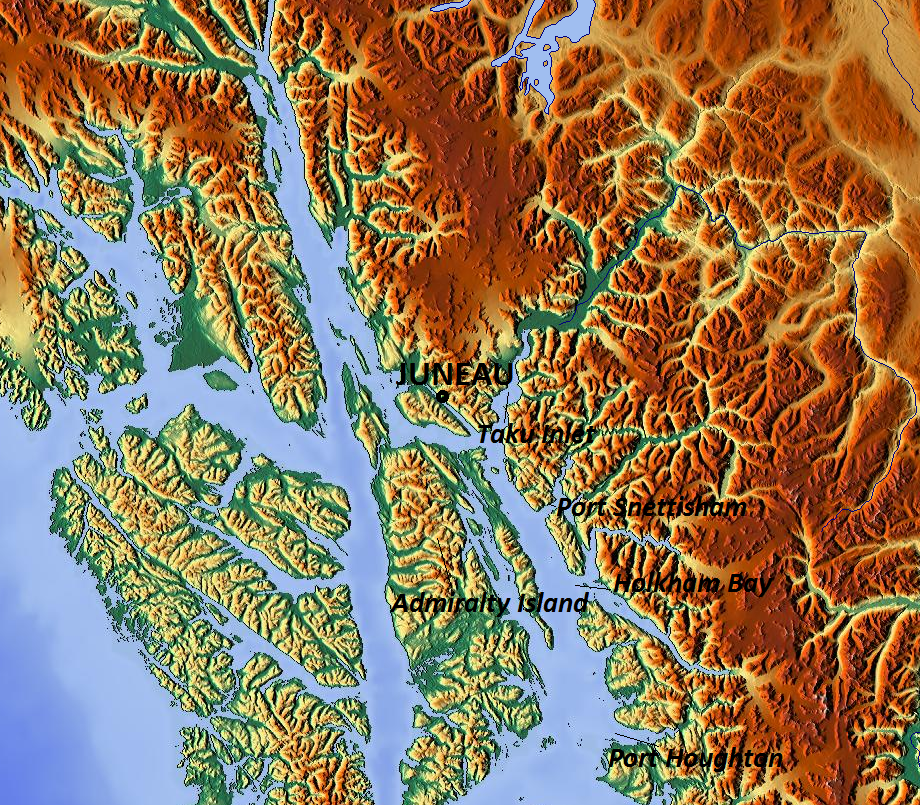
- Coordinates: 57.7458333°N 133.6252778°W
- Type: Bay
- Etymology: Holkham, England
- Ocean/sea sources: Inside Passage
- Basin countries: United States
- Max. width: 6 miles (9.7 km)
- Max. depth: 217 feet (66 m)
- Islands: Harbor Island

Holkham Bay (also known as Sumdum Bay) is a bay in the U.S. state of Alaska. It connects Tracy Arm and Endicott Arm on its east to Stephens Passage on its west.

== Etymology ==
Holkham Bay was named for Holkham, a community in Norfolk, England by George Vancouver. The name given by the USC&GS in the 1890s was "Soundon" and was reported as referring to the sound of ice falling off glaciers into the water. This led to the alternate name of Sumdum Bay in use today. Some mines in the area borrow both names.

Current scholarship based on Tlingit language work is that the area (of bay, mountain and glacier) was known as Sʼawdáan. There are two suggested origins, people of the "Greenstone Area" (from sʼoow-déin) or people of the "Dungeness Crab Area" (from sʼáaw-déin)

== History ==
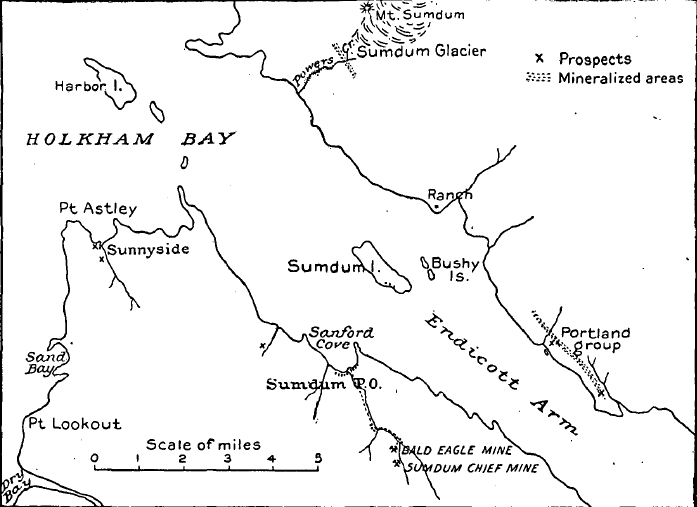
Map of Holkham Bay showing principal mines

The land surrounding Holkham Bay was inhabited by Tlingit people, along with much of the rest of Southeast Alaska. European discovery and its modern name came in 1794 after Joseph Whidbey, exploring as part of the Vancouver Expedition, reported the bay upon his return to George Vancouver. Whidbey reported several hostile encounters with the Tlingit on his journey.

Holkham Bay served as one of the operational bases for Canadians working to define the Canada–United States border to resolve the Alaska boundary dispute in the late 19th Century.

Naturalist John Muir devotes a chapter to his 1880 explorations of "Sum Dum Bay" in his final book, Travels in Alaska, published posthumously in 1915.

=== Mining ===
Gold was mined from quartz veins found in the black graphite slate. The Sumdum Mine is located 2.5 miles (4.0 km) south of Sanford Cove. Two ledges constitute the Sumdum Chief and Bald Eagle Mines and "have been mined to a depth of several hundred feet below their surface outcrops." Supporting structures included a 10-stamp mill, four large Frue Vanners, two Pelton wheels, a wagon road, a short tramway, and a wharf.

Gold was mined by the Portland Group from a siliceous schist ore body containing gold-bearing pyrite, galena, and sphalerite.

== Geography ==
Holkham Bay sits about 45 miles (72 km) south of Juneau, Alaska on the east side of Stephens Passage across from the Class Peninsula of Admiralty Island. Tracy Arm extends to the north from the bay to Sawyer Glacier. Endicott Arm leads southeast from the bay to Dawes Glacier. Both arms are fjords, which formerly held glaciers along their entire lengths. The bay is separated from the adjacent arms by an area of shallower water.

Harbor Island is the largest island in the bay, with the Round Islets making up the other islands. The island and the land surrounding the bay are part of the Tongass National Forest with some areas being part of the Chuck River Wilderness (to the south) and the Tracy Arm-Fords Terror Wilderness (to the east).
