= Tracy Arm =

Fjord in Alaska, U.S.

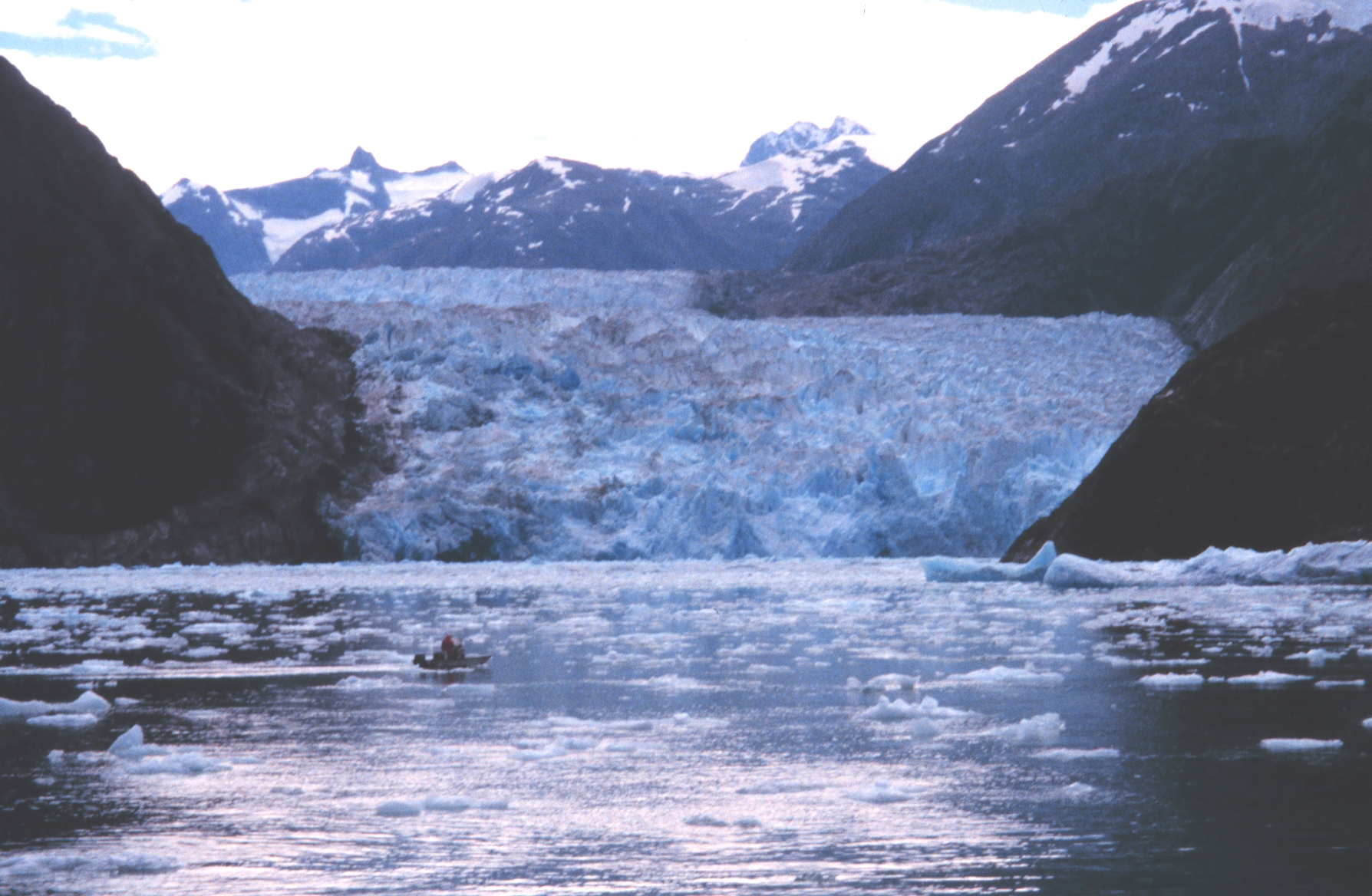
- Whaler from NOAA Ship John N. Cobb with Sawyer Glacier in the background.

- Location of the fjord
- Interactive map of Tracy Arm
- Location: Alaska, USA
- Coordinates: 57°54′41″N 133°24′08″W
- Type: Fjord
- Basin countries: Alaska
- Max. length: over 30 miles (48 km)

Tracy Arm is a fjord in the U.S. state of Alaska near Juneau (outlet at 57° 46' 40" N 133° 37' 0" W). It is named after Secretary of the Navy Benjamin F. Tracy (1889–93). It is located about 45 miles (72 km) south of Juneau and 70 miles (110 km) north of Petersburg, Alaska, off of Holkham Bay and adjacent to Stephens Passage within the Tongass National Forest. Tracy Arm is the heart of the Tracy Arm-Fords Terror Wilderness, designated by the United States Congress in 1990.

Tracy Arm-Fords Terror Wilderness contains 653,179 acres (2,643.32 km^{2}) and consists of two deep and narrow fjords: Tracy Arm and Endicott Arm. Both fjords are over 30 miles (48 km) long and one-fifth of their area is covered in ice. During the summer, the fjords have considerable floating ice ranging from hand-sized to pieces as large as a three-story building. During the most recent glaciated period, both fjords were filled with active glaciers

On August 10, 2025, a large landslide occurred in the fjord, generating a megatsunami with a height on land of 481 m (1,578 ft). As of 2026 this was the second highest tsunami in recorded history.

== Access ==
The most common access is by boat using Stephens Passage and entering Holkham Bay and Tracy and Endicott Arms. Float planes from Juneau and Petersburg are also used as a means of access. Large tour vessels and smaller commercial cruise boats frequently use Tracy Arm as a tour destination or as a stop along their normal tour routes.

== Sawyer Glacier ==
The twin Sawyer Glaciers, North Sawyer and South Sawyer, are located at the end of Tracy Arm. The wildlife in the area includes black and brown bears, deer, wolves, harbor seals, and a variety of birds, such as Arctic terns and pigeon guillemots. The mountain goats, which are usually found in the higher elevation areas, have been seen near the base of Sawyer Glacier.

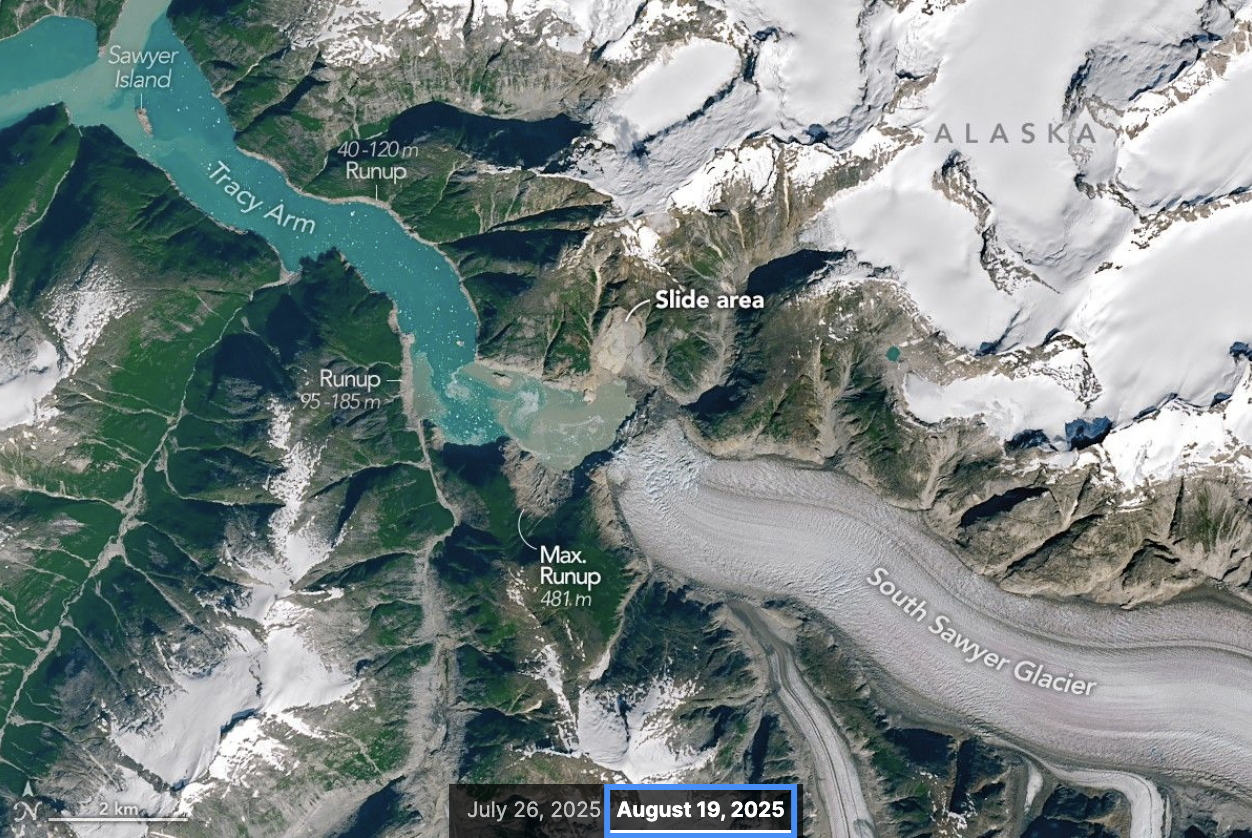
The shores of Tracy Arm, a fjord in southeast Alaska, are stripped of vegetation following a landslide and megatsunami that occurred on August 10, 2025.

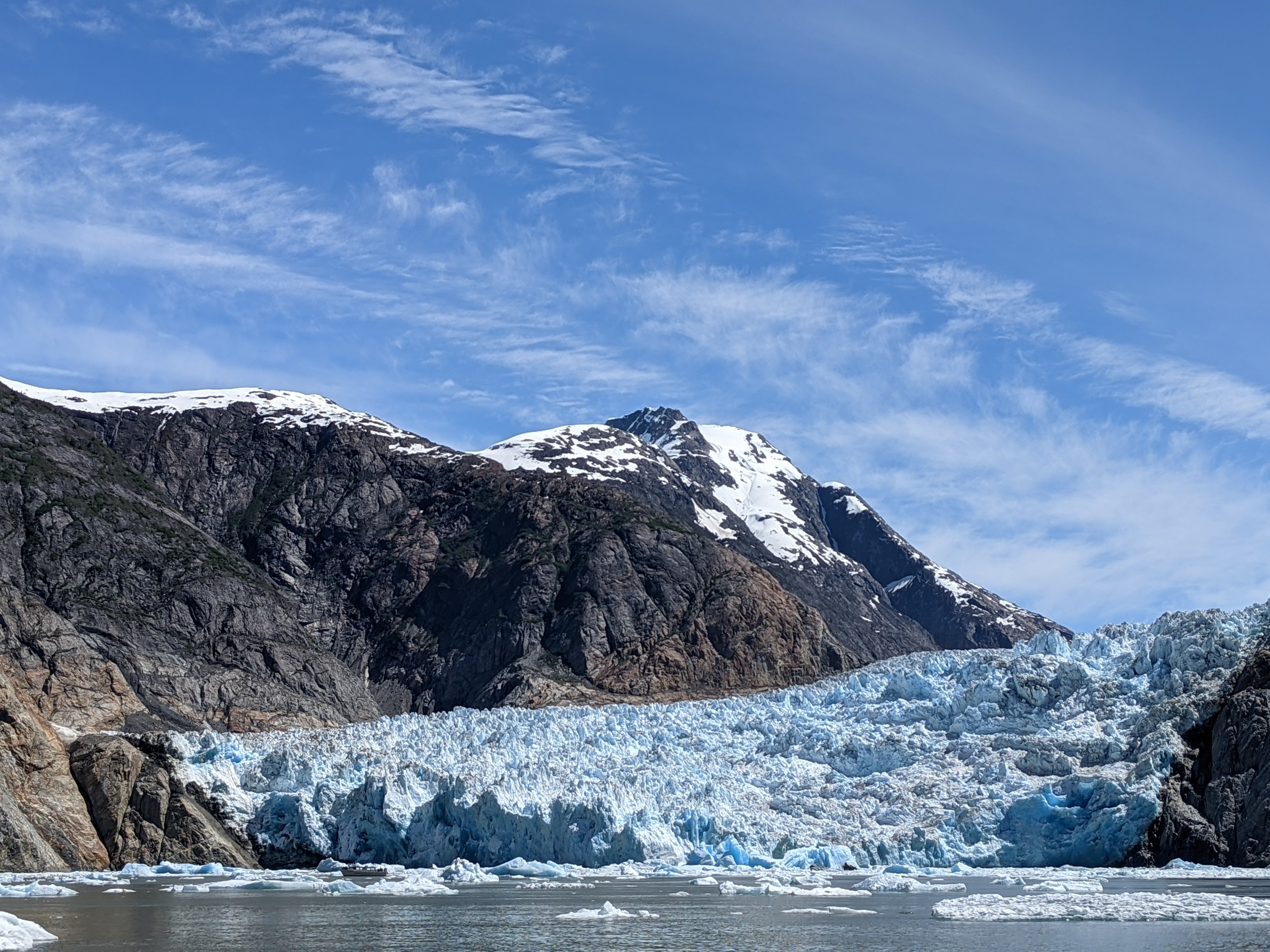
Sawyer Glacier captured from a commercial tour boat in June of 2021.

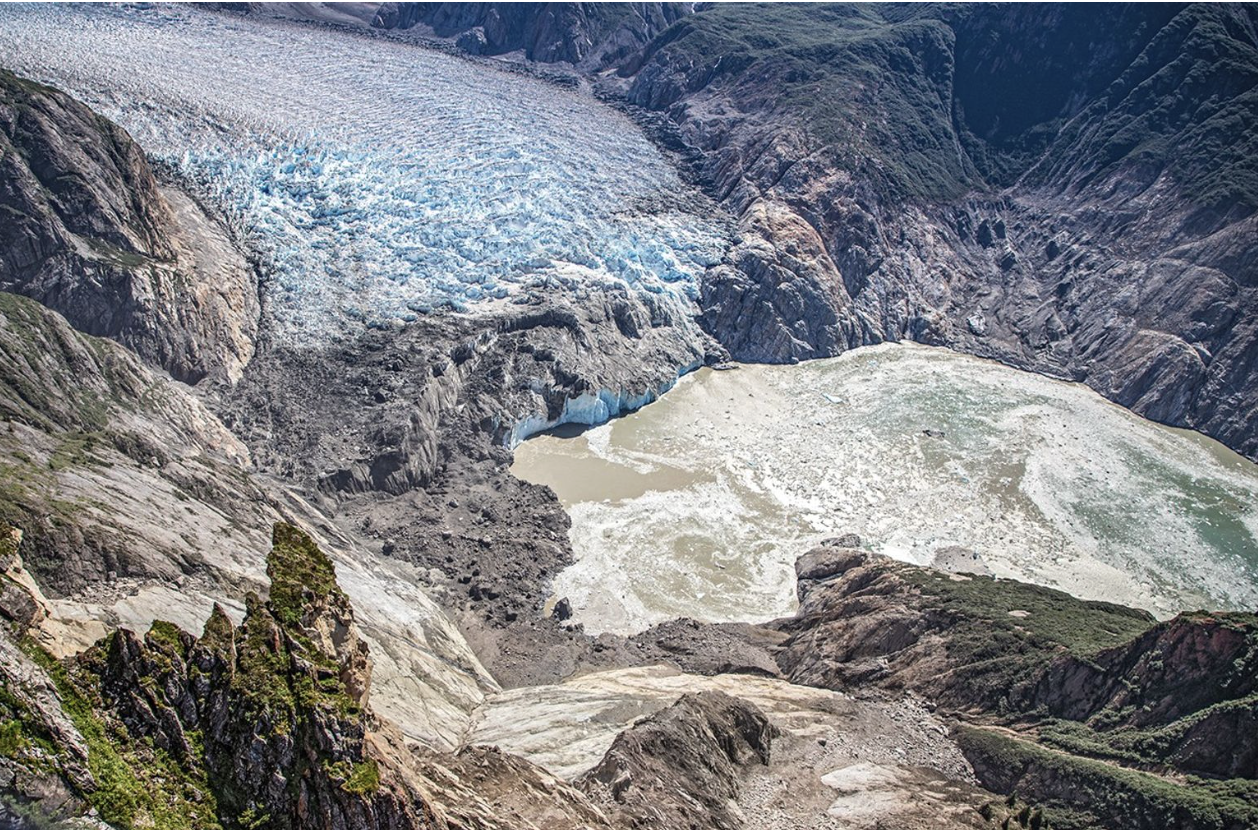
Landslide scar and the zone where vegetation was stripped by the tsunami are both visible here. August 13, 2025 photo

== Deepwater emergence ==
The deep passageways and thin continental shelf leads to unique connections between offshore and inshore waters. The colder water temperature, nutrient-rich upwelling, and strong currents allow for many species that live in deeper water to survive in the shallower waters.

The corals in this area, such as Primnoa pacifica, have contributed to the location being labeled as Habitat Areas of Particular Concern. P. pacifica is typically a deep water coral normally found between 150 metres (490 ft) and 900 metres (3,000 ft); however, in the Tracy Arm it is found between 20 feet (6.1 m) and 100 feet (30 m), offering a unique opportunity for research.

== 2025 megatsunami ==
At 05:26 local time (13:26 UTC) on 10 August 2025 a 63 million cubic meter rockslide caused a megatsunami, found on later analysis to have had a run-up height of about 481 m (1,578 ft). The area is visited in daytime by tourist cruise ships, which would have been devastated by a tsunami at a later hour.

Huge megatsunamis are caused by landslides into water; unlike many ocean tsunamis they are usually localised and dissipate quickly. Research suggests that glacier melt driven by climate change is making such collapses far worse. The only known higher megatsunami occurred in 1958 in Lituya Bay, Alaska, a region especially prone to megatsunamis because of its steep mountains, narrow fjords and frequent earthquakes.
