= Cape Spencer (Alaska) =

Alaska headland

Coordinates: 58.1995°N 136.6395°W

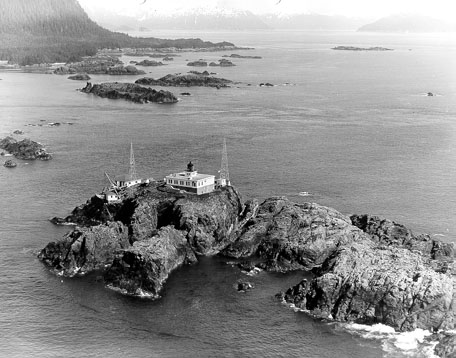
The Cape Spencer Light in Cape Spencer, Alaska

Cape Spencer is a headland on the Alaska shore, at the side of the entrance to Cross Sound west of Juneau, Alaska. Located in Glacier Bay National Park and Preserve, it is the site of the Cape Spencer Light.
