= Yakobi Island =

Uninhabited island in Alexander Archipelago, Alaska, US

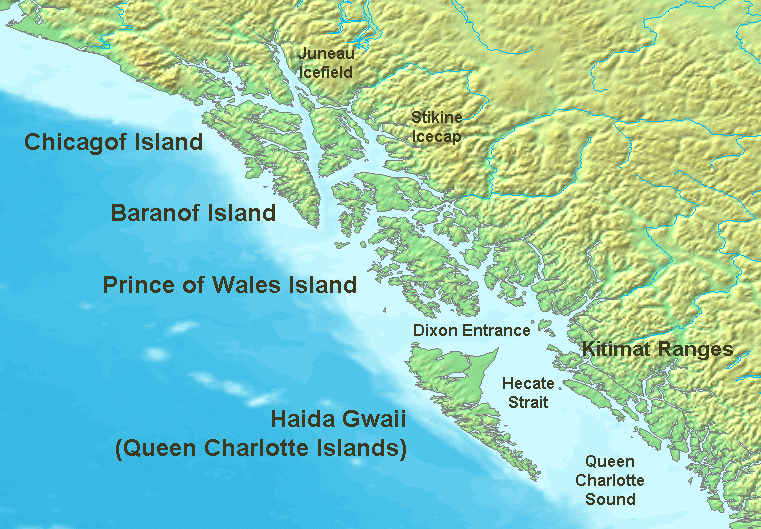
- Yakobi Island location is just off the western edge of Chichagof Island.
- Interactive map of Yakobi Island

Geography
- Coordinates: 57°59′16″N 136°28′30″W

Administration
- United States
- State: Alaska
- Borough: Unorganized Borough

Additional information
- Time zone: AKST (UTC-9)
  - Summer (DST): AKDT (UTC-8)
- ZIP code: 99901 ... 99950
- Area code: +1 907

Yakobi Island (Russian: Якоби) is an uninhabited island in the Alexander Archipelago of southeastern Alaska, United States. It lies to the south of Cross Sound and just off the western edge of Chichagof Island, separated from it by Lisianski Inlet and Lisianski Strait. The island has a land area of 82.37 sq mi (213.3 km^{2}) and no permanent resident population.

Yakobi Island was named by Baranov after Ivan Iakobi, the governor-general of Irkutsk and Kolyvan. The Tlingit name for the island is Takhanes.

== See also ==
- West Chichagof-Yakobi Wilderness
