= Lemesurier Island =

Island in Alaska, United States

Coordinates: 58°17′04″N 136°05′05″W

Lemesurier Island is the second-largest island in the Icy Strait between Chichagof Island and the mainland of the Alaska Panhandle in the U.S. state of Alaska. The island lies about midway between the mainland city of Gustavus and the northwest Chichagof Island community of Elfin Cove.

The island was called Tàaś Daa by the Huna Tlingit people, which can be translated as "Two-headed Tide Island". The island was used as a place to gather currants, harvest seals and as a fort location.

The island was named by W.H. Dall, after William Le Mesurier (1767–1833), a midshipman on HMS Chatham.

It has a land area of 27.534 km^{2} (10.631 sq mi) and reported a population of one person in the 2000 census. Together with Pleasant Island and the Inian Islands, it forms the Pleasant/Lemesurier/Inian Islands Wilderness, a wilderness area within Tongass National Forest that has been officially designated by the National Wilderness Preservation System.

== See also ==
- List of U.S. Wilderness Areas
