= HMS Global Maritime =

American maritime conglomerate

- Industry: Transportation, Cruises
- Founded: 1994
- Headquarters: New Albany, Indiana, United States
- Key people: John Waggoner, President & CEO
- Website: hmsgm.com

HMS Global Maritime is a maritime conglomerate headquartered in New Albany, Indiana. The company consists of five divisions - American Queen Steamboat Company, Victory Cruise Line, HMS Ferries, Seaward Services and HMS Consulting. The line operates globally, but mostly within North America and Japan.

== History ==
HMS Global Maritime was founded as Hornblower Marine Services in 1994 by former director of marine operations at Hornblower Cruises, John Waggoner.

In 2018 the company was awarded Louisville Business First's "Business of the Year" award in the very large company category.

A ferryboat passenger alleged the company violated state law and their constitutional rights in a federal district court, but the court ruled in favor of the company in 2020.

== American Queen Steamboat Company ==
After the demise of Majestic America Line in 2008 and three years of sitting idle at the Beaumont Reserve Fleet in Beaumont, Texas, the then 16 year-old steamer American Queen was acquired by HMS Global Maritime in 2011 with the help of a $9 million loan from the city of Memphis, Tennessee. Out of this acquisition, American Queen Steamboat Company was formed.

The AQSC fleet currently consists of four river cruiseships: American Queen (re-launched in 2012), American Empress (launched in 2014), American Duchess (launched in 2017), and American Countess (launched in 2020). All four vessels operate solely within the United States, with Queen, Duchess and Countess sailing the Mississippi, Ohio, Tennessee, Cumberland and Illinois Rivers, and Empress sailing the Columbia and Snake Rivers.

== Victory Cruise Lines ==
In 2019, HMS Global acquired Victory Cruise Lines. The line's two vessels were taken out of service for the first few months after the purchase to undergo multi-million dollar renovations. In an AQSC company publication, CEO John Waggoner stated that repeat AQSC passengers had for a long time expressed the desire to cruise the Great Lakes.

The Victory Cruise Lines fleet currently consists of Victory I and Victory II which cruise the Great Lakes during the Summer and U.S. east coast and Mexico during colder months. In 2021, the line's upcoming third vessel, Ocean Victory is expected to completed and will sail Alaska.

== HMS Ferries ==
HMS Ferries is a division of HMS Global that operates the following ferry vessels across the United States:

- Channel Cat (Quad Cities)
- Gees Bend Ferry (Camden, AL and Gees Bend, AL)
- Governor's Island Ferry (New York City, NY)
- Mobile Bay Ferry (Mobile Bay, AL)
- Oklahoma River Cruises (Oklahoma City, OK)
- Pierce County Ferry (Steilacoom, WA, Anderson Island and Ketron Island)
- RiverLink Ferry (Philadelphia, PA and Camden, NJ)
- St. John's River Ferry (Jacksonville, FL)

== Seaward Services ==
Seaward Services is a division of HMS Global that provides operation, maintenance and repair to government and privately owned vessels. Of the vessels Seaward Services is currently contracted to, one is the USNS Guam.

== HMS Consulting ==
HMS Consulting offers professional guidance related to maritime business development, safety, risk management and technical services.
