= American Countess =

River cruise paddlewheel ship

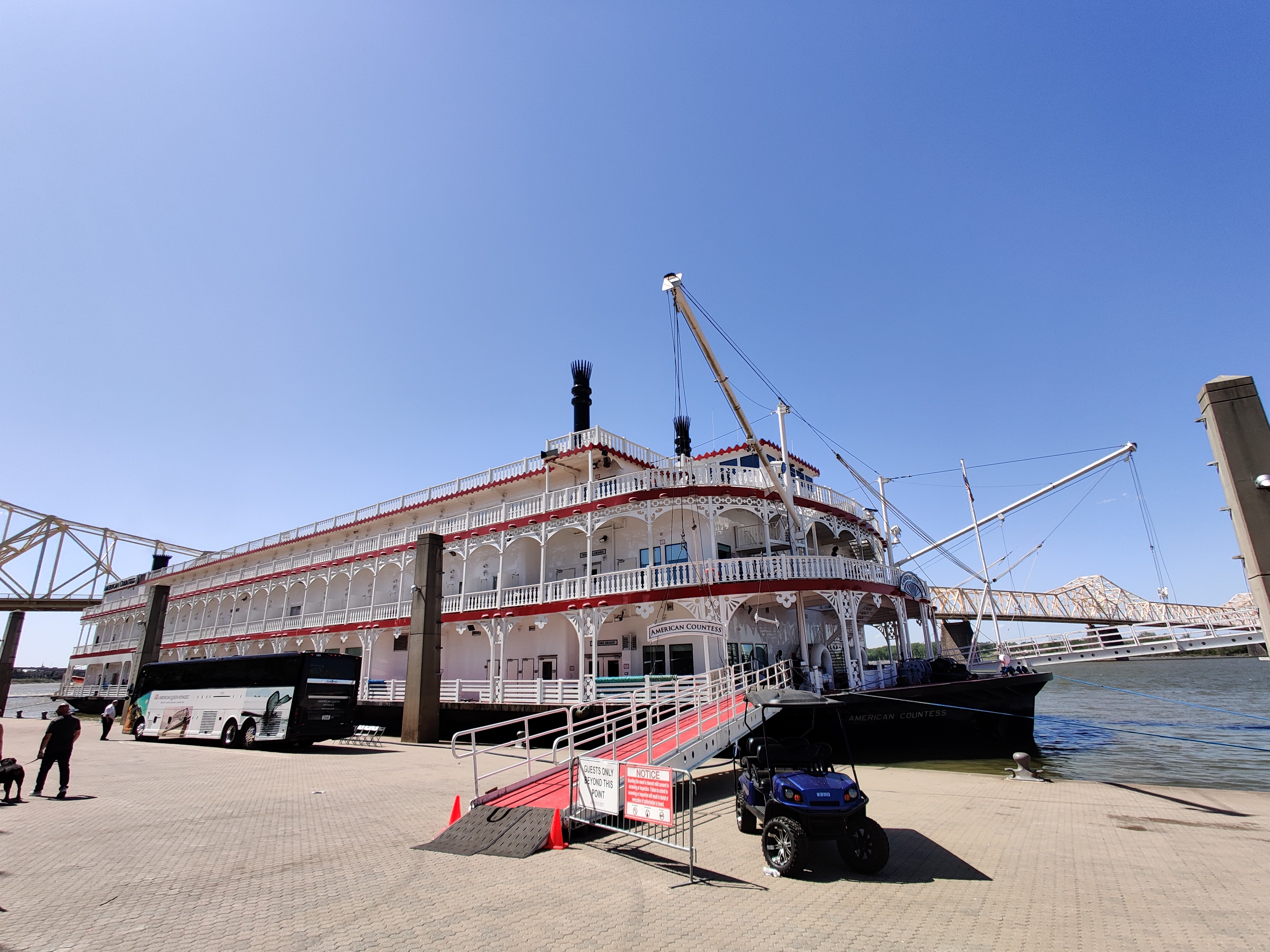

History
- Name: Kanesville Queen (1995–2016); American Countess (2020–present)
- Owner: Harrah's Entertainment (1995–2013); Newt Marine (2013-2016); American Queen Voyages (2016–2024); American Cruise Lines (2024-present)
- Operator: American Cruise Lines
- Port of registry: Louisville, Kentucky, USA
- Launched: 1995
- Identification: MMSI number: 368048990; Callsign: WDK3816

General characteristics
- Length: 318 ft (97 m)
- Beam: 79 ft (24 m)
- Decks: 4
- Propulsion: Paddlewheel and Z-drive (diesel electric)
- Capacity: 245 passengers

American Countess is a river cruise paddlewheeler owned by American Cruise Lines.

== Kanesville Queen (1995-2016) ==
The casino boat Kanesville Queen was originally constructed for Harrah's Entertainment in Council Bluffs, Iowa and opened to the public on New Year's Day of 1996. In 2007, Iowa law was changed to allow casinos to operate fully onshore. After the revision of the law, Harrah's officials stated that the river vessel was no longer needed at their Council Bluffs casino and estimated it would save the company $2 million annually to retire the boat. In 2013, Kanesville Queen was sold as scrap to Newt Marine of Dubuque, Iowa.

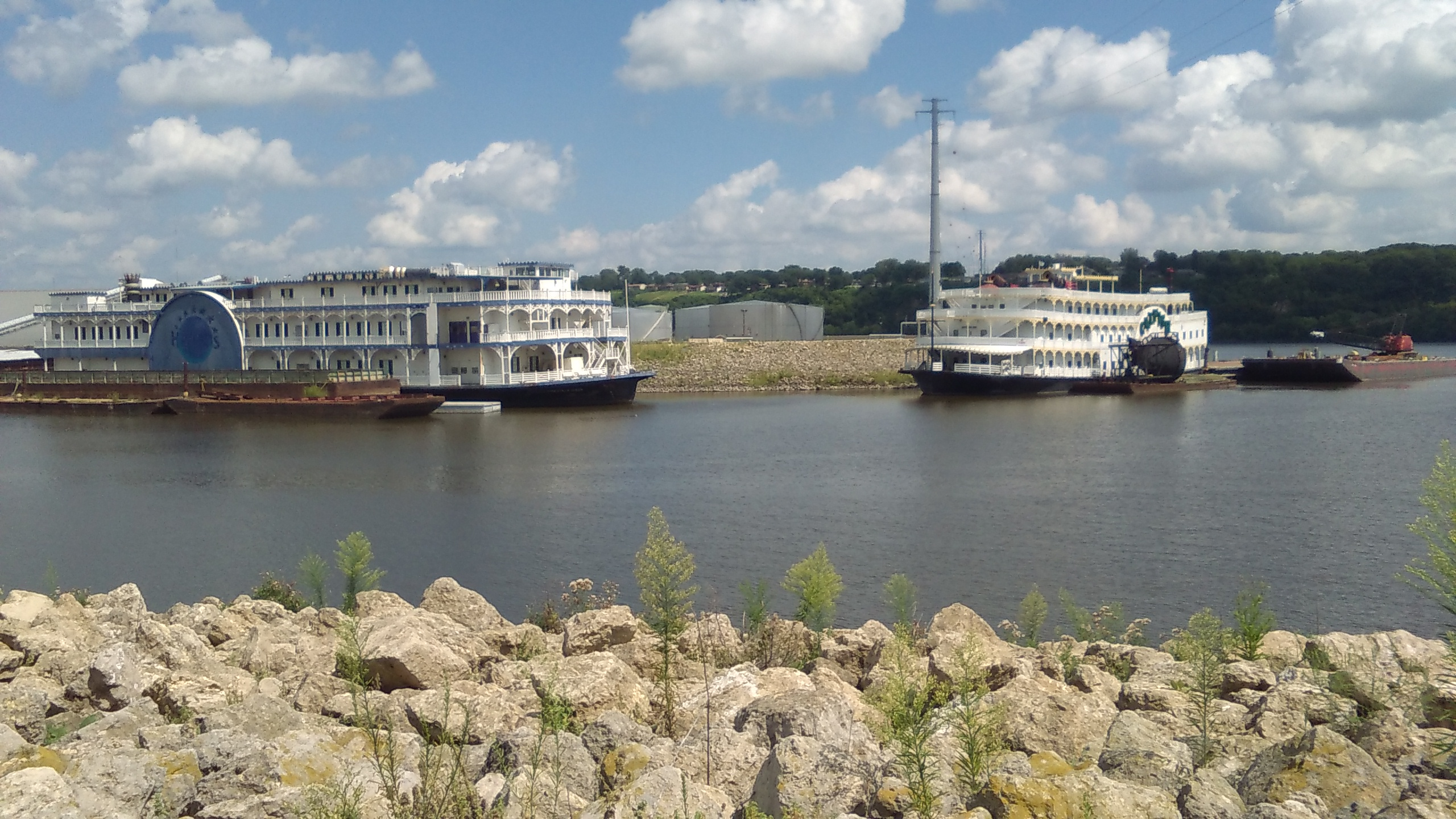
Kanesville Queen (left) abandoned in Dubuque, IA along with Catfish Bend Riverboat Casino II (right) in 2016

== Introduction as American Countess ==
Purchased by American Queen Steamboat Company in 2016, the dormant vessel was eventually brought to Gulf Island Shipyard in Houma, Louisiana to be cut in half and extended with a new 60-foot midsection in order to increase passenger capacity.

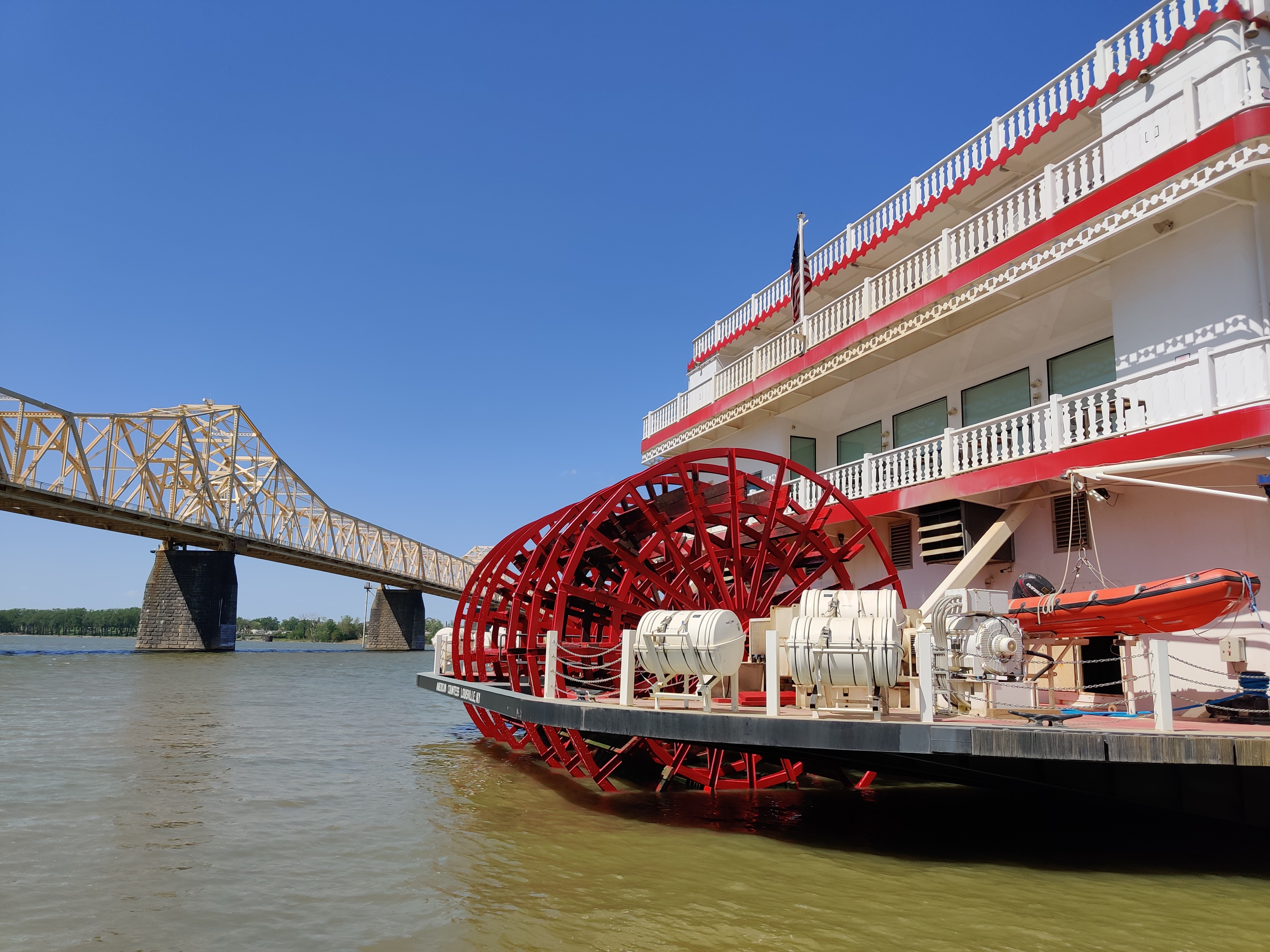
A view of the stern of American Countess docked in Louisville

After many delays, the American Countess was finally launched on March 21, 2021, in New Orleans. The launch followed almost four years after the launch of American Duchess, another former Iowa casino boat that had been converted into an overnight cruise vessel by the same company.

In February 2024, American Queen Voyages ceased operations. American Countess was purchased by American Cruise Lines for $1.6 million. It is to be scrapped without further use.

== See also ==
- American Queen
- American Duchess
- American Empress
- Delta Queen
- Mississippi Queen
