= Pleasant Island =

Pleasant Island may refer to:

- Pleasant Island, former name of Nauru, an island country in the Micronesian South Pacific
- Pleasant Island (Alaska), an island in Alaska
