= Harrah's Council Bluffs =

Casino in Council Bluffs, Iowa

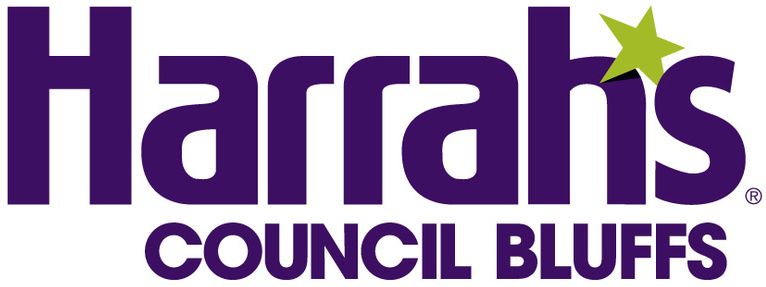

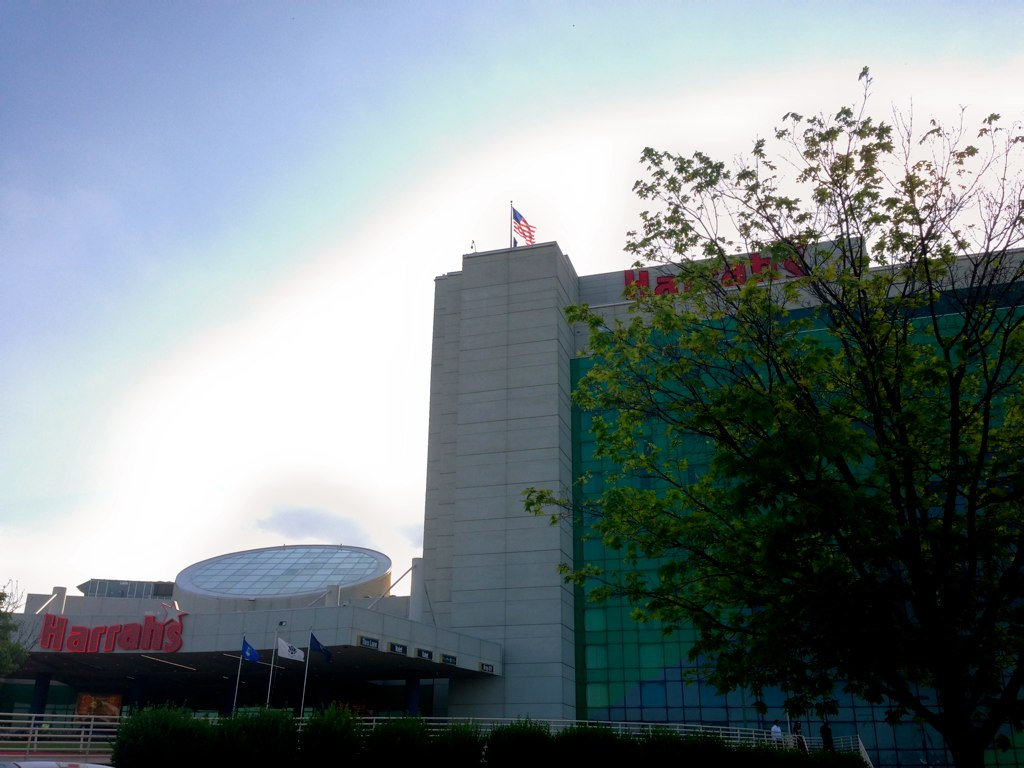
- Interactive map of Harrah's Council Bluffs
- Location: Council Bluffs, Iowa, U.S.; 1 Harrah's Boulevard; 41.251250°N 95.914217°W
- Opened: January 1, 1996; 30 years ago
- Theme: Pavilion
- No. of rooms: 251
- Gaming space: 25,000 sq ft (2,300 m^{2})
- Permanent shows: Stir Concert Cove – Various Musicians
- Signature attractions: Vertigo Lounge
- Notable restaurants: 360 Steak House; Guy Fieri's
- Owner: Vici Properties
- Operating license holder: Caesars Entertainment
- Previous names: Harveys Council Bluffs
- Renovated in: 2002
- Website: caesars.com/harrahs-council-bluffs

Harrah's Council Bluffs is a hotel and casino located in Council Bluffs, Iowa across the Missouri River from Omaha, Nebraska. It is owned by Vici Properties and operated by Caesars Entertainment. Harrah's Council Bluffs has many amenities including a 251-room hotel, 2 restaurants and 2 bars.

Harrah's Council Bluffs is one of three casinos in the city of Council Bluffs including Horseshoe Council Bluffs and Ameristar Casino Council Bluffs.

On October 6, 2017, ownership of the property was transferred to Vici Properties as part of a corporate spin-off, and it was leased back to Caesars Entertainment.

== History ==
Harrah's began as Harvey's having opened in 1996 with the Kanesville Queen riverboat, a three-story floating casino. Harrah's later acquired Harvey's in 2001. In 2007, Iowa law allowed casino operators to move to on shore operations. Maintenance costs for the riverboat were high, with Harrah's claiming to have spent over $400,000, to dredge around the boat annually. In 2013, Harrah's scrapped the riverboat, which was inconvenient to customers due to its 300-foot ramp entrance. They moved casino operations to the former convention center into a 25,000 square foot facility with room for 600 slot machines. Convention operations were moved off site to Horseshoe at the Mid-America Center.
