= West Chichagof-Yakobi Wilderness =

Wilderness area in southeastern Alaska, United States of America

Coordinates: 57°44′31″N 136°04′31″W

The West Chichagof-Yakobi Wilderness is a federally designated wilderness in the United States. It encompasses 265,286 acres (107,357 ha) in Southeastern Alaska. It includes Yakobi Island and the entire western side of Chichagof Island, and the many small island systems along their coasts.

The wilderness was created through a citizen's proposal after teachers from the area suggested that it would be a good place to preserve. The proposal requested that the wilderness run from Lisianski Inlet south to the north end of Hoonah Sound. The Wilderness was designated in 1980 by the Alaska National Interest Lands Conservation Act. It is part of Tongass National Forest, which is managed by the United States Forest Service.
