= Icy Strait =

Inlet of the Pacific Ocean in Alaska, United States

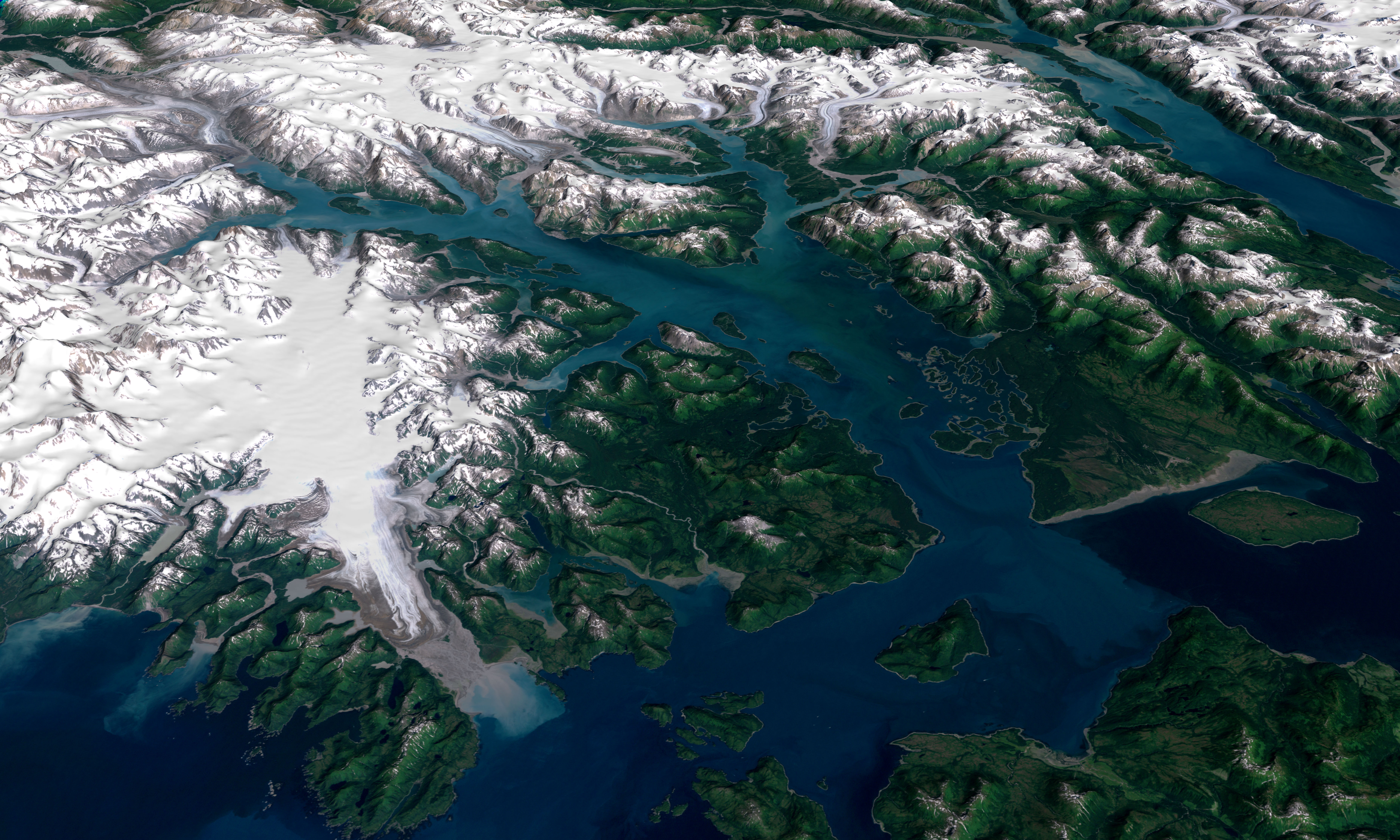
Silted meltwater from the Brady Glacier discolours the shallow waters of Icy Strait.

The Icy Strait is a strait in the Alexander Archipelago in southeastern Alaska, at about 58°16′41″N 135°38′48″W.

== Geography ==
Icy Strait separates Chichagof Island to the south and the Alaska mainland to the north. The strait is 64 km (40 mi; 35 nmi) from its west side at the intersection of the Cross Sound and Glacier Bay to its east side at Chatham Strait and the Lynn Canal. The two largest islands in the strait are Pleasant Island and Lemesurier Island.

The Cape Spencer Light is an important former lighthouse and remains an active aid to navigation.

The nearby cruise ship destination Icy Strait Point is named in reference to Icy Strait.

== History ==
At 9:57 p.m. on September 13, 1886, the sidewheel steamer Ancon, a cargo liner, ran aground on an uncharted rock in Icy Strait within 0.5 nautical miles (0.9 km; 0.6 mi) of Point Gustavus while attempting to enter Glacier Bay. After three hours, she floated free on the rising tide at 1:00 a.m. on September 14, and her captain beached her on a sandy shore about 1.5 nautical miles (2.8 km; 1.7 mi) from the rock to prevent her from sinking. She was refloated on October 2, 1886, and, after initial repairs, run ashore again in Bartlett Cove for additional repairs. She finally proceeded to Juneau, Alaska, for permanent repairs. A United States Coast and Geodetic Survey team sent to chart the rock in November 1886 named it "Ancon Rock," and a buoy moored at the site now warns ships of the submerged Ancon Rock. Ancon returned to service in mid-December 1886.

The cruise ship Empress of the North ran aground near Rocky Island and took on some water there on May 14, 2007, causing the evacuation of her passengers. None were injured.
