= American Queen =

1995 recreation Mississippi river steamboat

Coordinates: 30.024°N 94.001°W

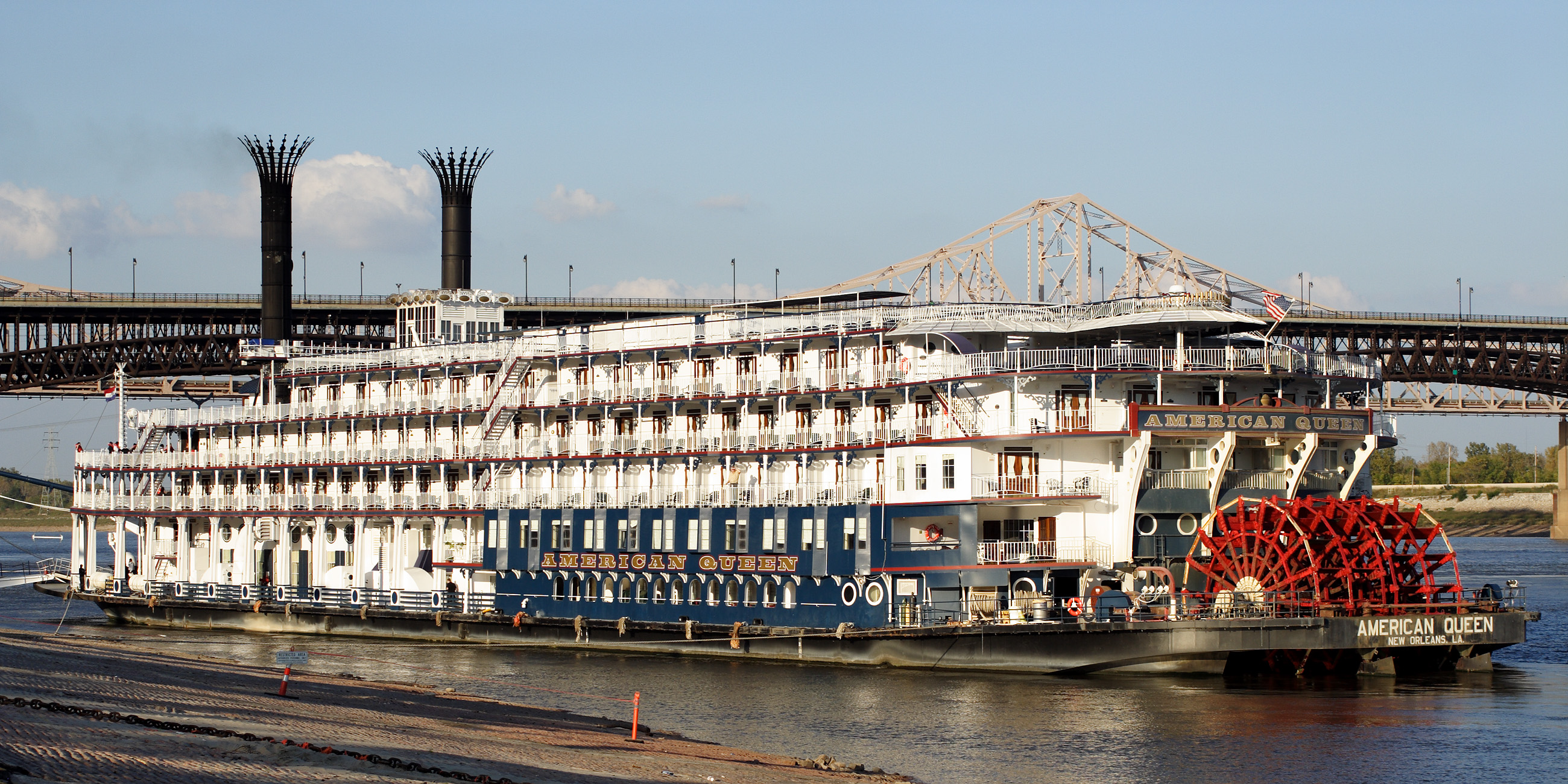
- The American Queen

History

United States
- Name: American Queen
- Owner: Delta Queen Steamboat Company (1995-2006); Majestic America Line (2006-2008); United States Maritime Administration (2008-2011); American Queen Steamboat Company (2011-2024); American Cruise Lines (2024-2025)
- Port of registry: Memphis, United States
- Route: Mississippi River and tributaries
- Builder: McDermott Shipyard
- Cost: US$ 65 million
- Laid down: 1994
- Launched: 1995
- Christened: June 1995; by Lynne Cooper Harvey & Paul Harvey
- Maiden voyage: June 9, 1995
- Out of service: February 20, 2024
- Identification: IMO number: 9084542
- Fate: Scrapped

General characteristics
- Class & type: Steamboat
- Tonnage: 3707
- Length: 418 ft (127 m)
- Beam: 89 ft (27 m)
- Height: 109.5 ft (33.4 m)
- Draft: 8.5 ft (2.6 m)
- Decks: 7 (6 passenger 1 crew)
- Installed power: Steam engine and diesel-electric
- Propulsion: Paddlewheel and Z-drive
- Capacity: 222 staterooms, 436 passengers
- Crew: 160

American Queen was a Louisiana-built river steamship said to be the largest river steamboat ever built. American Queen's primary mode of propulsion was its stern paddlewheel powered by a steam engine extracted from the 1932 dredging vessel Kennedy. Her secondary propulsion, which provided additional maneuverability and speed, came from a set of diesel-electric propellers known as Z-drives on either side of the sternwheel. There were also two bow thrusters that offered better maneuverability when docking or treading water. She had 222 state rooms for a capacity of 436 guests and a crew of 160. She was 418 feet (127 m) long and 89 feet (27 m) wide.

== History ==
=== Delta Queen Steamboat Company (1994–2011) ===
Construction of the ship began in 1994 by McDermott Shipyard in Morgan City, Louisiana and was completed in mid 1995. The vessel was created for Delta Queen Steamboat Company to be a six-deck recreation of a classic Mississippi riverboat. Upon the arrival of American Queen in New Orleans, Louisiana, the vessel was christened by radio producer Angel Harvey with a 4-foot tall bottle of Tabasco hot sauce rather than a bottle of champagne which is traditionally used in ship christenings. The vessel's maiden voyage set sail from New Orleans on June 2, 1995, bound for Pittsburgh, Pennsylvania. During that same inaugural cruise on June 20, American Queen got stuck in mud during a photoshoot 130 miles downriver from Louisville, Kentucky. Water and fuel were pumped off in order to lighten the vessel and free it from the mud.

In May 1996, American Queen participated in the Summer Olympics torch relay. It was originally planned for the AQ to carry the flame up the Mississippi River from St. Louis, Missouri to the hometown of Mark Twain - Hannibal, Missouri. Due to high water levels on the rivers, American Queen could not reach St. Louis. So instead, the Olympic flame was brought aboard the vessel on the Ohio River in Paducah, Kentucky and stayed onboard until reaching the confluence of the Mississippi and Ohio Rivers at Cairo, Illinois.

On June 4, 1997, while docked in Memphis Harbor, passengers aboard the American Queen spotted the body of a man floating near the southern tip of Mud Island and notified the vessel's crew. First mate Dave Williamson retrieved the body to bring to local police which was later identified to be the remains of singer Jeff Buckley.

American Classic Voyages, the parent company of Delta Queen Steamboat Company, declared bankruptcy on October 19, 2001. ACV blamed its fate on the September 11 terrorist attacks and the spike in cancelled reservations, although many other factors attributed to the bankruptcy. Despite launching an ambitious expansion, American Classic Voyages faced operational challenges. According to sources close to ACV, the company's successful brands had strayed from what had made them attractive to their niche clientele, ACV's rollout of new cruises was mismanaged and the company had a costly dispute with its shipbuilder, Northrop Grumman Ingalls Shipbuilding.

Resulting from the bankruptcy of American Classic Voyages, American Queen was taken out of service in October 2001. Delta Queen Steamboat Co. was subsequently purchased by Delaware North and American Queen was brought back into service in January 2003.

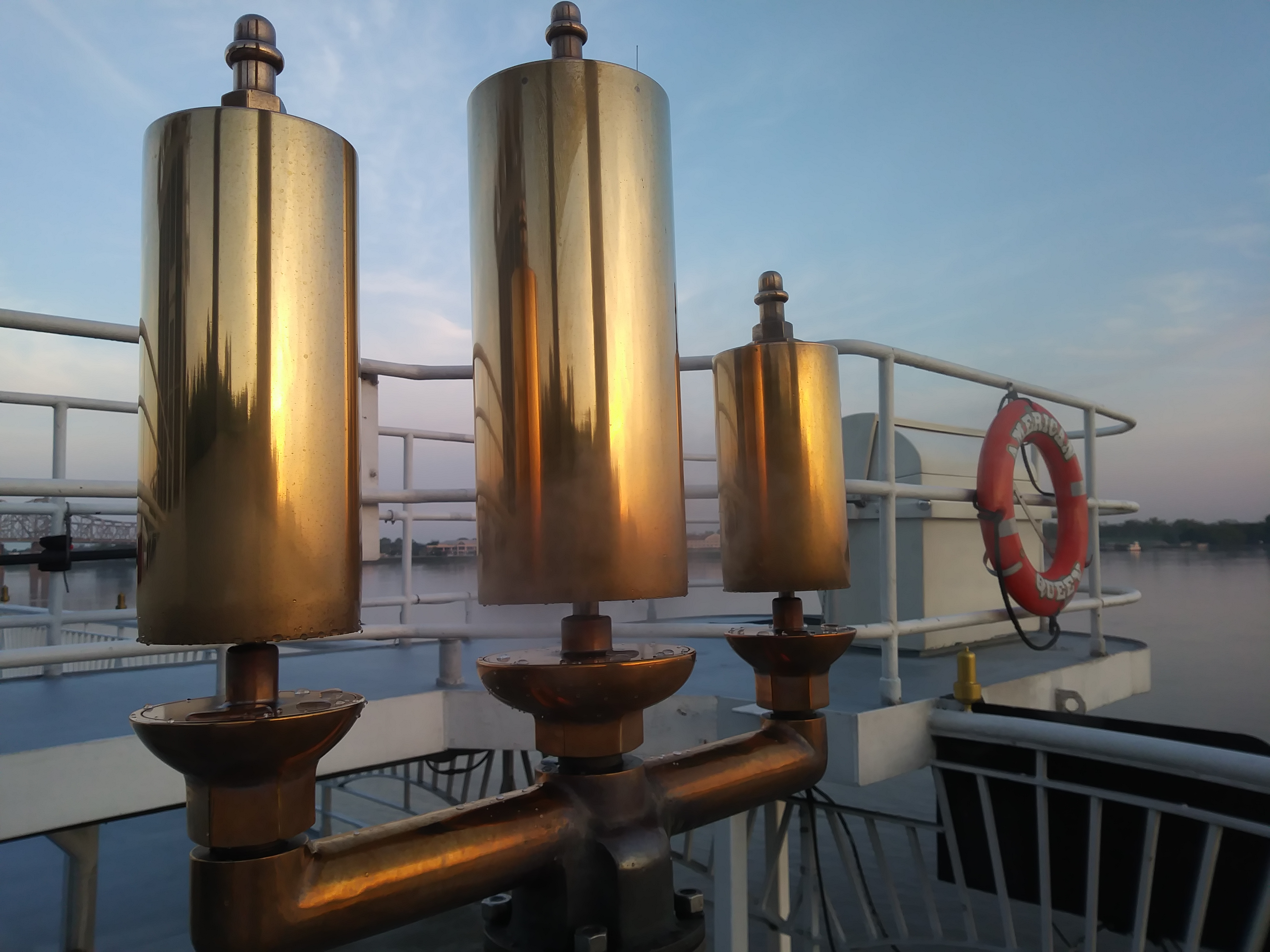
The steam whistle of the American Queen, located in front of the port side bridge wing

Following reports that Delta Queen Steamboat Co. had suffered heavier losses than previously stated from the damages and travel disruption of Hurricane Katrina, Delaware North sold the company to Ambassadors International Inc. in April 2006 for $3 million.

From 2006 to 2008, American Queen and its sister vessels sailed under Majestic America Line, a subsidiary of Ambassadors International. After multiple failed attempts throughout 2008 to sell Majestic America Line, it was decided to break up the fleet and sell the vessels individually.

On November 20, 2008, the steamer American Queen was retired to the reserve fleet in Violet, Louisiana. Due to the failure of Majestic America Line, she was returned to the United States Maritime Administration (MARAD) who held her $30 million mortgage. The U.S. Department of Transportation Maritime Administration records the ship's movement to the Beaumont Reserve Fleet on January 22, 2009.

In April 2011 American Queen was purchased for $15.5 million by HMS Global Maritime of New Albany, Indiana.

=== American Queen Steamboat Company (2011–2024) ===
In April 2012, HMS Global Maritime relaunched American Queen under a new cruise line, Great American Steamboat Company. The company held a new christening to celebrate the steamboat relocating its home port to Memphis. American Queen was the first passenger vessel to dock at the new Beale Street Landing, built long enough to accommodate the 418-foot long steamboat. Priscilla Presley, named godmother of the American Queen, rechristened the vessel with a bottle of champagne before it set sail on its inaugural cruise with its new company, this time without sister vessels Delta Queen which became a floating hotel affixed to shore in Chattanooga, Tennessee, and Mississippi Queen which was scrapped in 2011. The new inaugural cruise departed from Memphis bound for Cincinnati, Ohio. Along the way, American Queen participated for the first time in the Great Steamboat Race. She came in second place. Following a trademark dispute from American Cruise Lines, Great American Steamboat Company changed its name to American Queen Steamboat Company effective July 1, 2012.

For a period around 2014, the American Queen Steamboat was a member of Historic Hotels of America, the official program of the National Trust for Historic Preservation.

In October 2014, American Queen struck jagged rock on the Cumberland River on its way into Nashville, Tennessee. Passengers were able to embark on time while repairs were made, although the vessel had to wait for Coast Guard clearance before sailing which came a day later. American Queen suffered another accident during high water conditions on the Mississippi River shortly before midnight on September 4, 2018, when she collided with the old Champ Clark Bridge in Louisiana, Missouri. The vessel sustained some damage to its port side.

In the late 2010s, AQSC began rapidly expanding its fleet. The company purchased two abandoned casino boats in 2016 which would later be remodeled and reintroduced as American Duchess and American Countess. In January 2019, AQSC acquired Victory Cruise Lines which consisted of Great Lakes cruise ships, Victory I and Victory II. The two coastal cruisers were reintroduced under AQSC as Ocean Voyager and Ocean Navigator respectively.

In response to the global outbreak of the COVID-19 virus, American Queen Steamboat Company suspended operations in March 2020. AQSC, along with numerous other cruise lines worldwide would struggle to return to normal operations for the next couple years.

In October 2021, American Queen Steamboat Company changed its name to American Queen Voyages to reflect the addition of ocean-going itineraries. The company's headquarters were relocated from New Albany, Indiana to Fort Lauderdale, Florida.

In February 2024 American Queen Voyages announced they were ceasing operations and shutting down. In March 2024, assets of American Queen Voyages were put up for auction. Competitor American Cruise Lines successfully bid for all four of AQV's river vessels. American Queen was purchased for a price of $2.15 million.

Upon the purchase, American Cruise Lines evaluated options for the future of the American Queen other than adding the vessel to their operational fleet or as it was immediately done with sister vessels American Duchess and American Countess, selling it as scrap. In May 2024, they were reported to be contacting cities and towns along the Mississippi River and its tributaries to offer up the 29 year-old vessel as a donation.

In January 2025, footage was released online showing American Queen in the process of being dismantled at a scrapyard in Houma, Louisiana, with all its exterior cabin doors removed. That same winter, another notable and record-setting US-built passenger cruiseliner, SS United States was towed to Alabama to be scuttled and become an artificial reef.

== Facilities ==
The American Queen had health and wellness facilities that included a spa with masseuse located on main deck and a gym and pool located between the fifth and sixth decks. For dining, the vessel offered formal dining in the J.M. White Dining Room located on main deck and a casual, 24-hour dining option called the Front Porch Cafe located on Deck 3. There was also the River Grill & Bar which was an outdoor bar on Deck 5 that offers drinks and cookout-style food during good weather. There were also several entertainment venues including the Grand Saloon - a stage theater modeled after Ford's Theatre. Other entertainment options included a movie theater on Deck 3, musical performances in the Engine Room Bar on Deck 2 and numerous card games and reading materials in the Gentlemen's Card Room, Ladies' Parlor, Mark Twain Gallery and Chart Room.

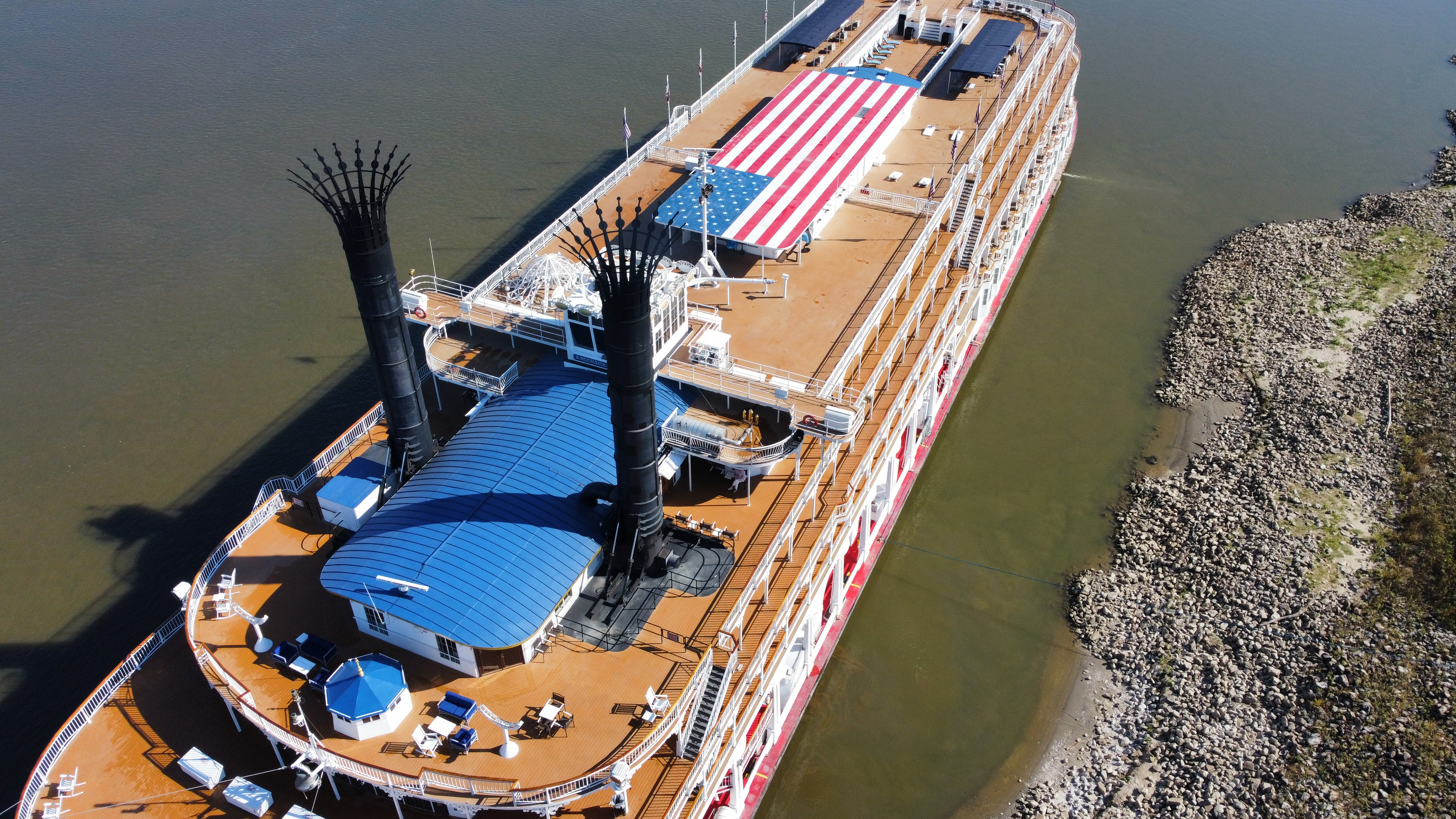
An aerial view of American Queen's upper decks 4, 5 and 6. The bridge deck and pilot house are located just aft of the smoke stacks.

== Themed voyages ==
American Queen passengers experienced themed voyages with special appearances by various performers and lecturers, such as Lewis Hankins as Mark Twain. The Civil War themed voyage included historians as guest speakers, and the Twain cruise featured Cindy Lovell and other Twain scholars.

== Routes ==
The American Queen cruised the Mississippi River from its mouth to as far north as St. Paul, Minnesota. She also traveled the entire length of the Ohio River, the Tennessee River as far up as Chattanooga, Tennessee, the Cumberland River as far up as Nashville, Tennessee and the Illinois River as far up as Ottawa, Illinois. In addition to these rivers, the American Queen entered the Yazoo Diversion Canal when visiting Vicksburg, Mississippi, Lake Ferguson when visiting Greenville, Mississippi and the Allegheny River when visiting Pittsburgh, Pennsylvania. The riverboat has also traversed the Gulf of Mexico in order to reach maintenance and repair facilities in Morgan City, Louisiana and Beaumont, Texas.

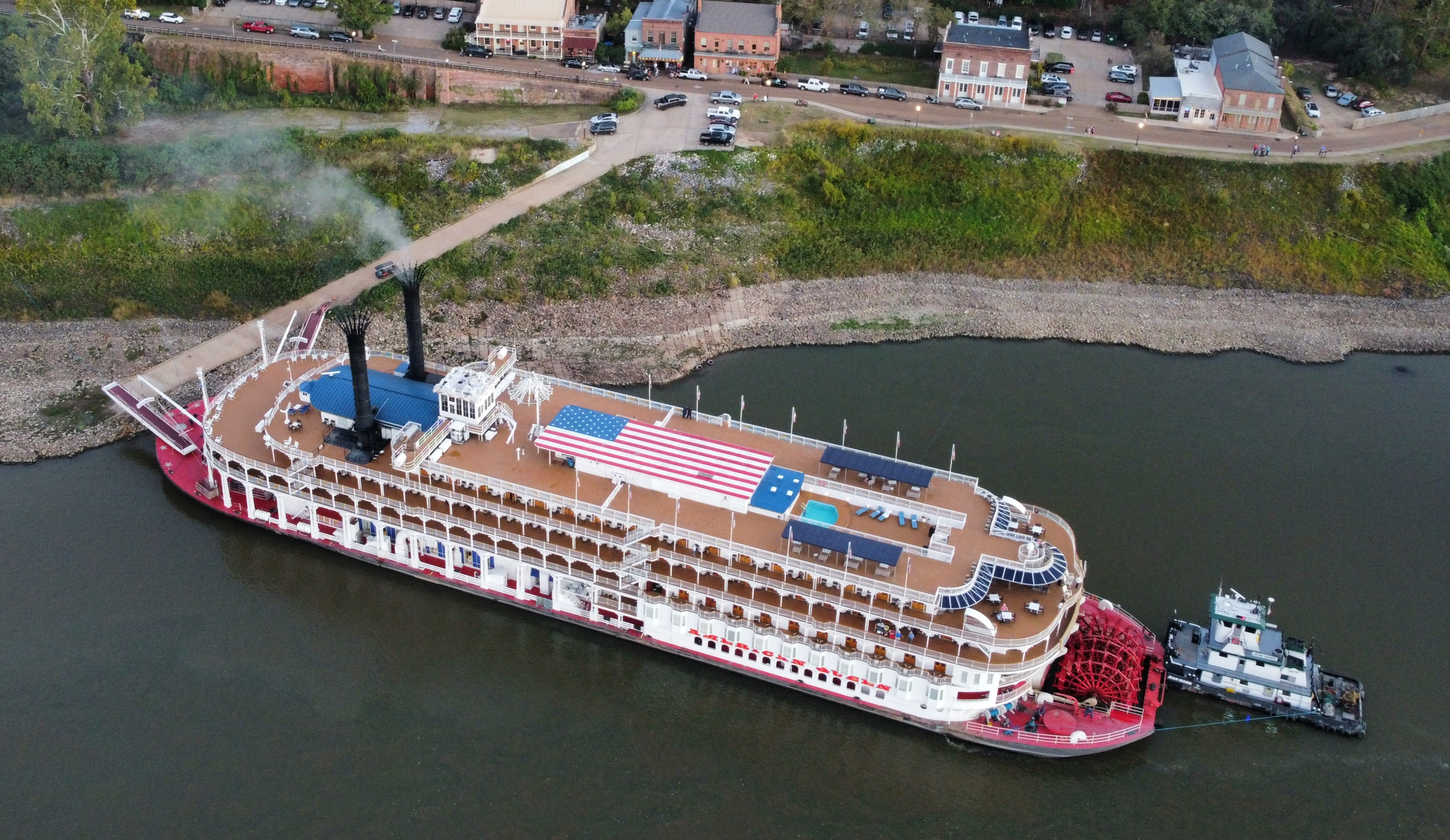
American Queen docked at the bottom of Silver Street in Natchez, Mississippi.

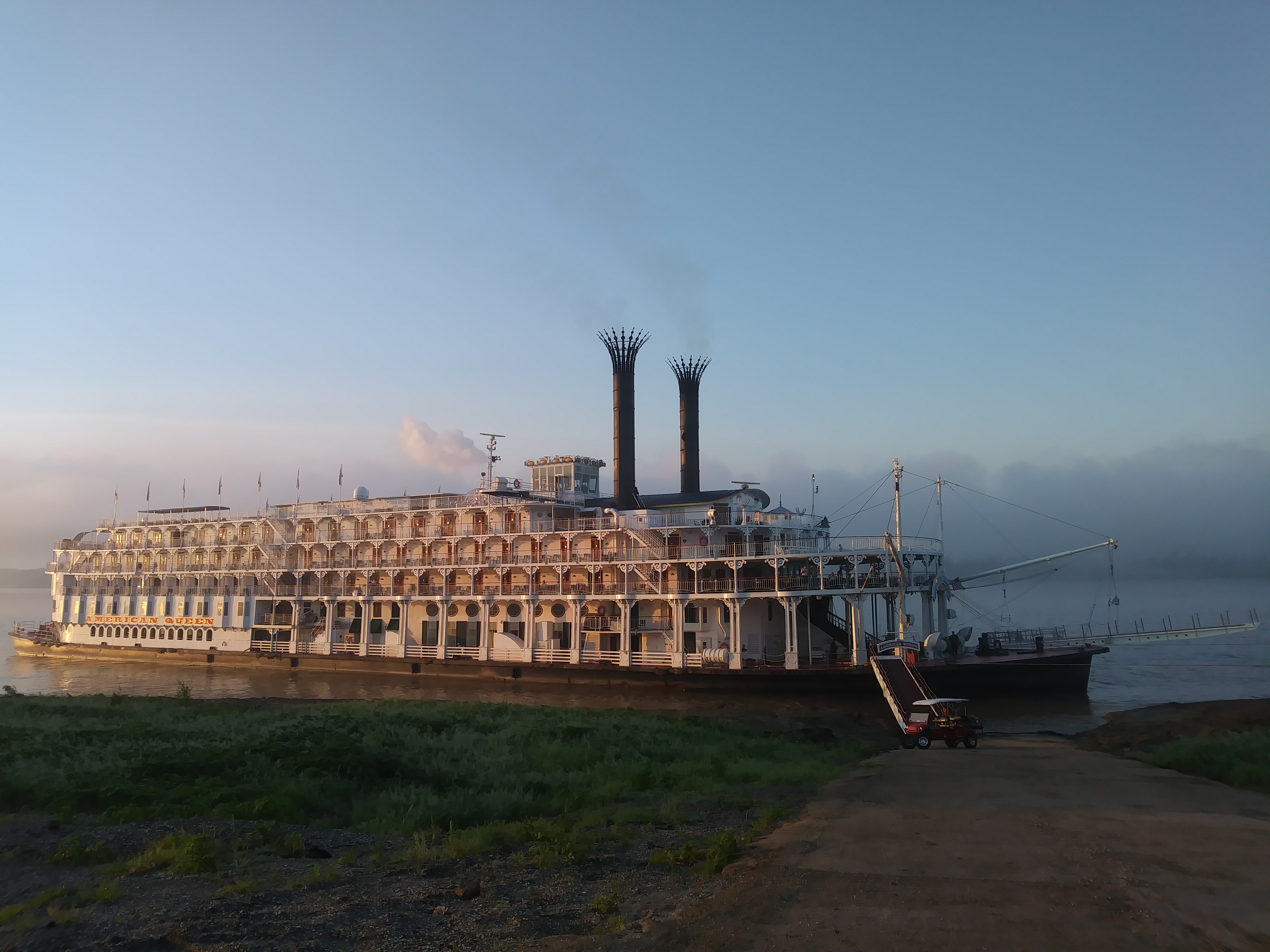
American Queen docked in St. Francisville, Louisiana in September 2017.

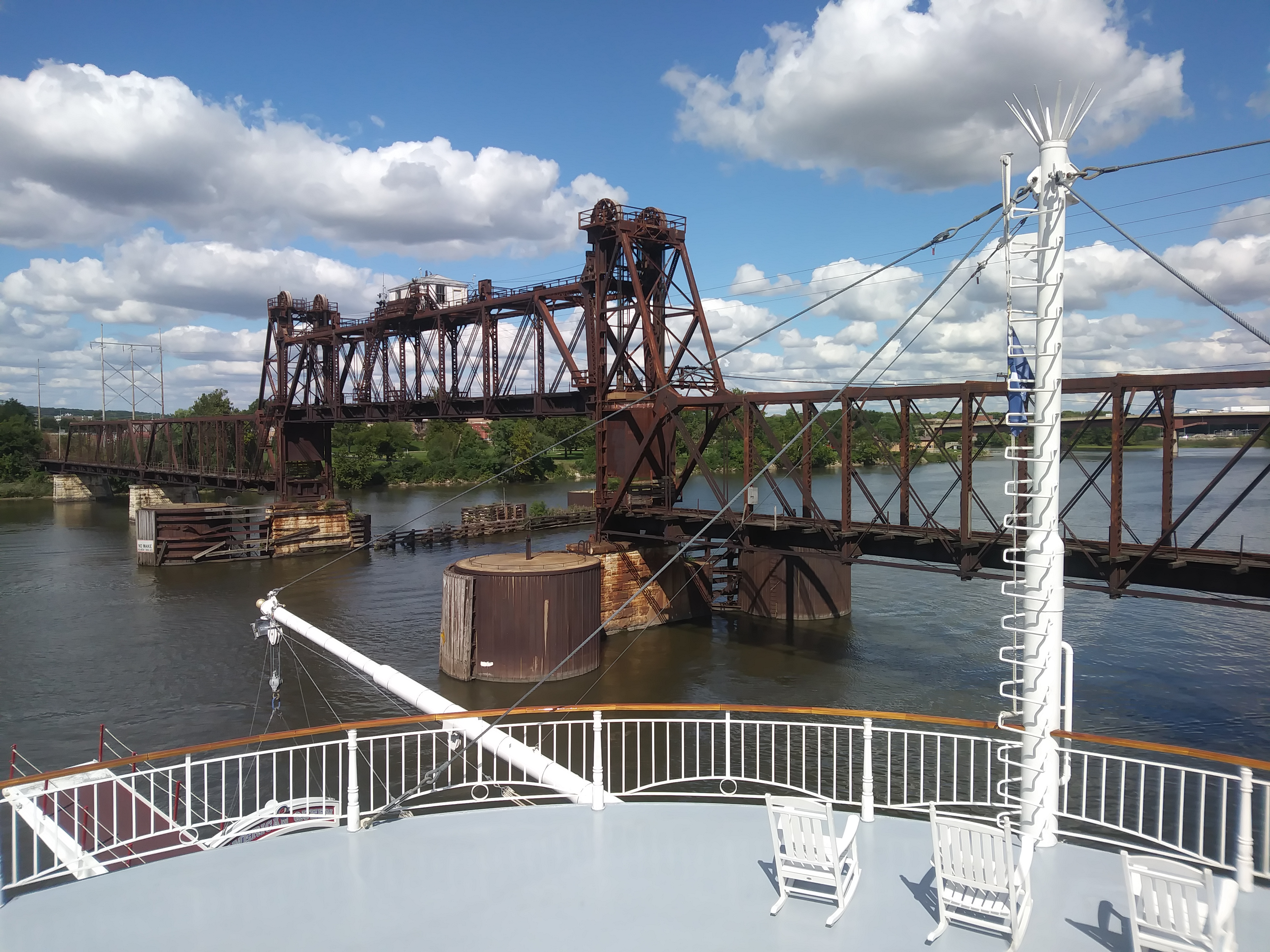
American Queen docked in Ottawa, Illinois facing the Ottawa Rail Bridge in September 2018. She cannot proceed up the Illinois River beyond this point.

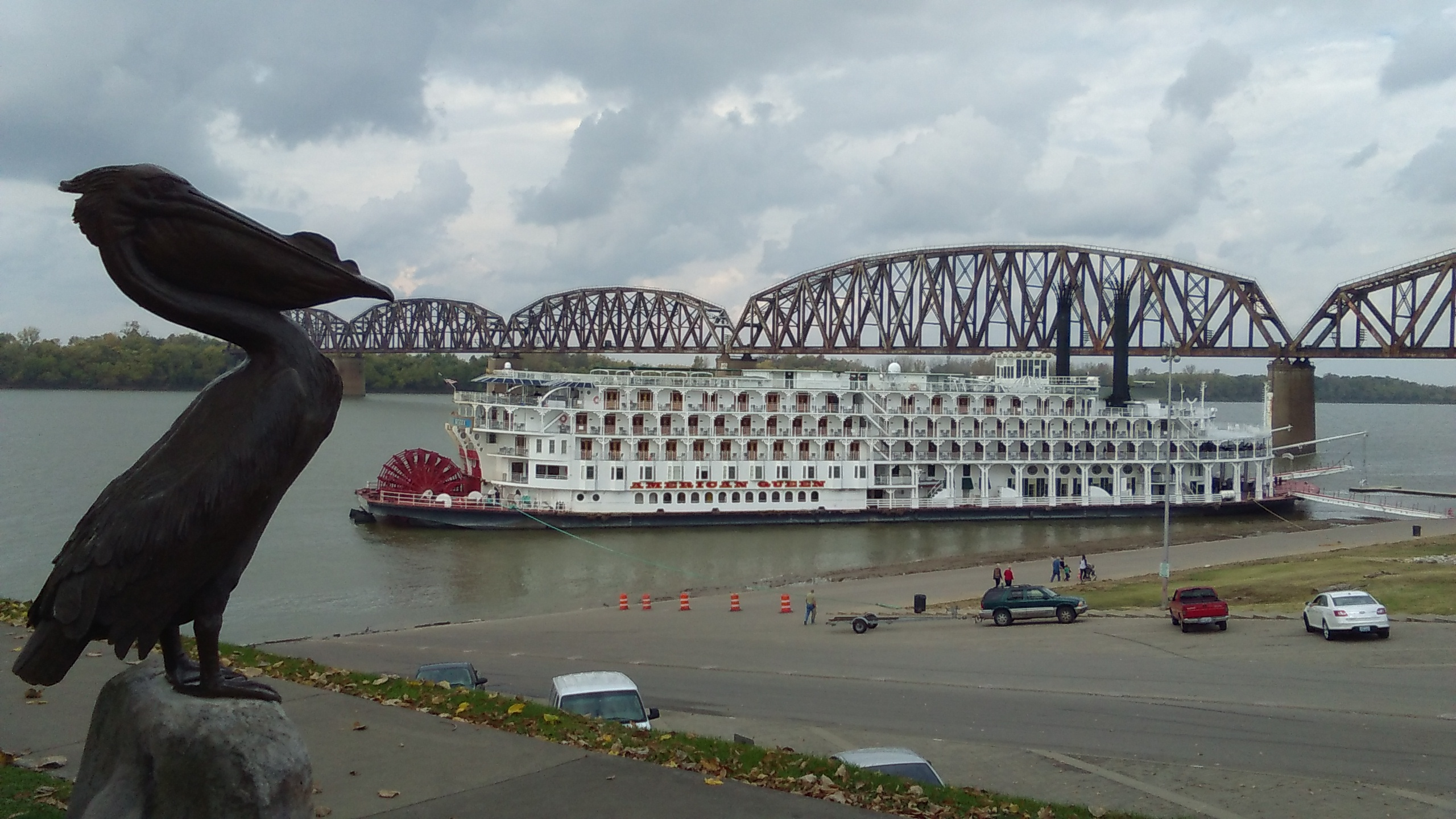
American Queen docked in Henderson, Kentucky in November 2015.

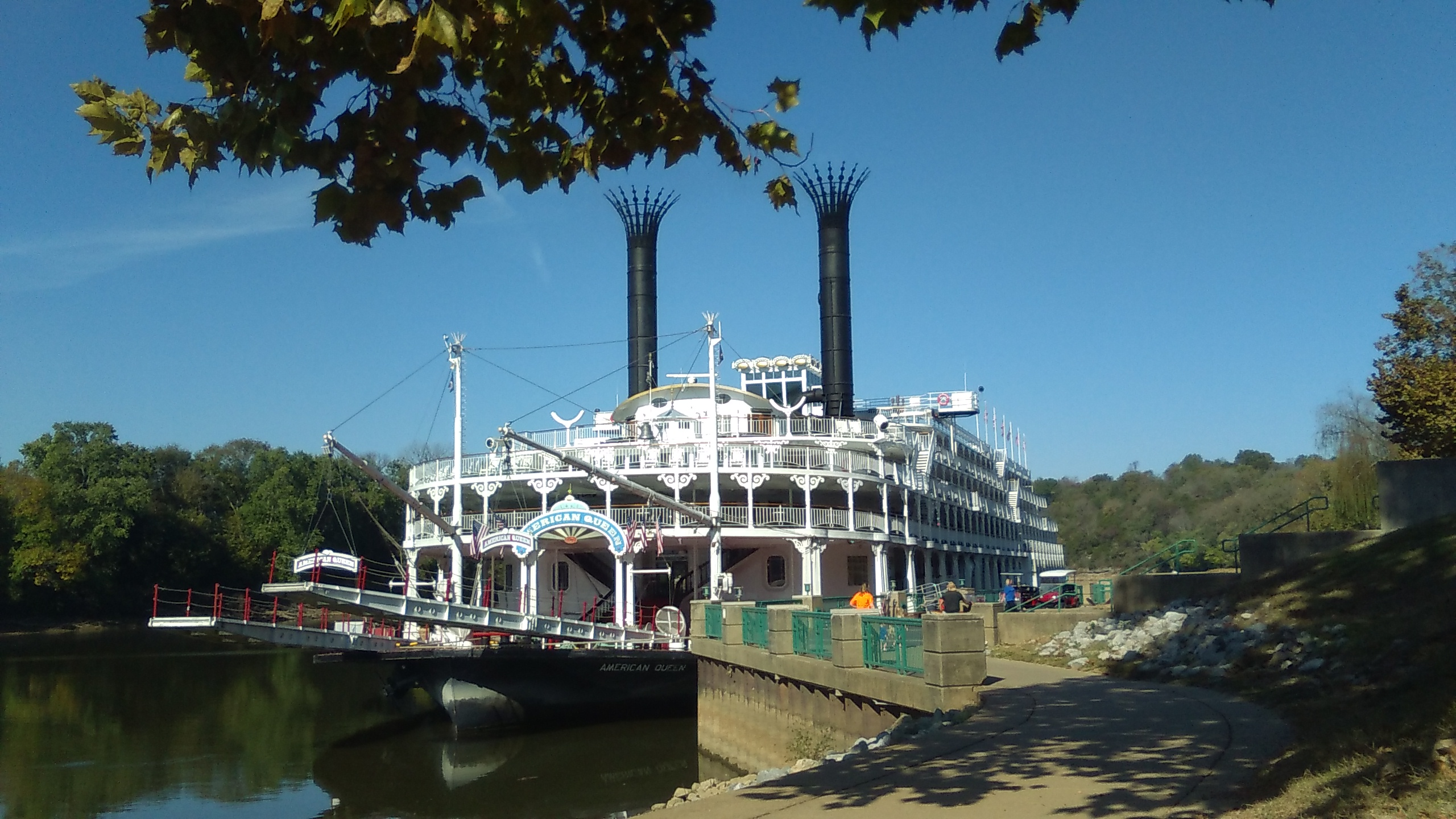
American Queen docked in Clarksville, Tennessee in October 2016.

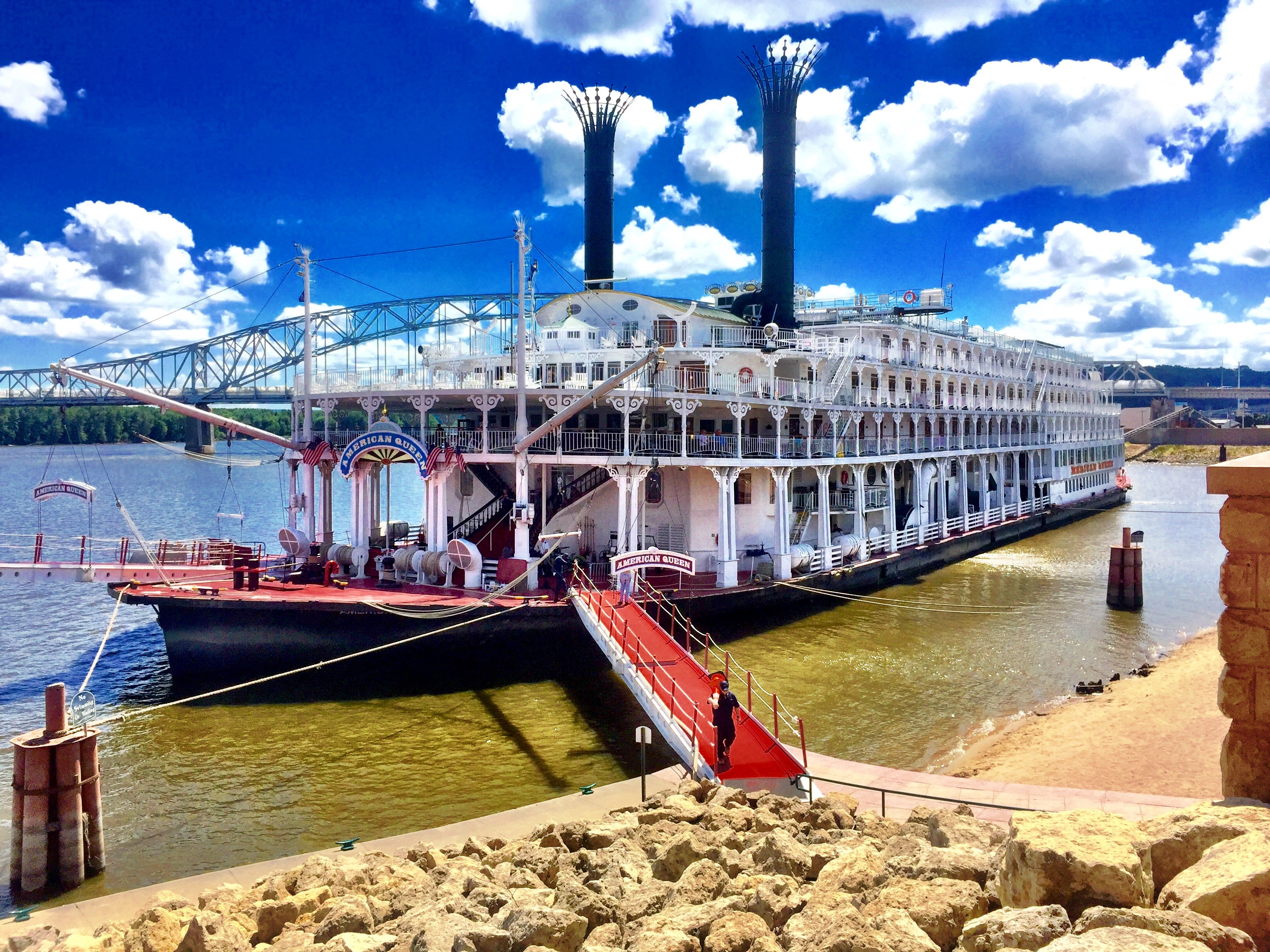
American Queen docked in Dubuque, Iowa in August 2015.

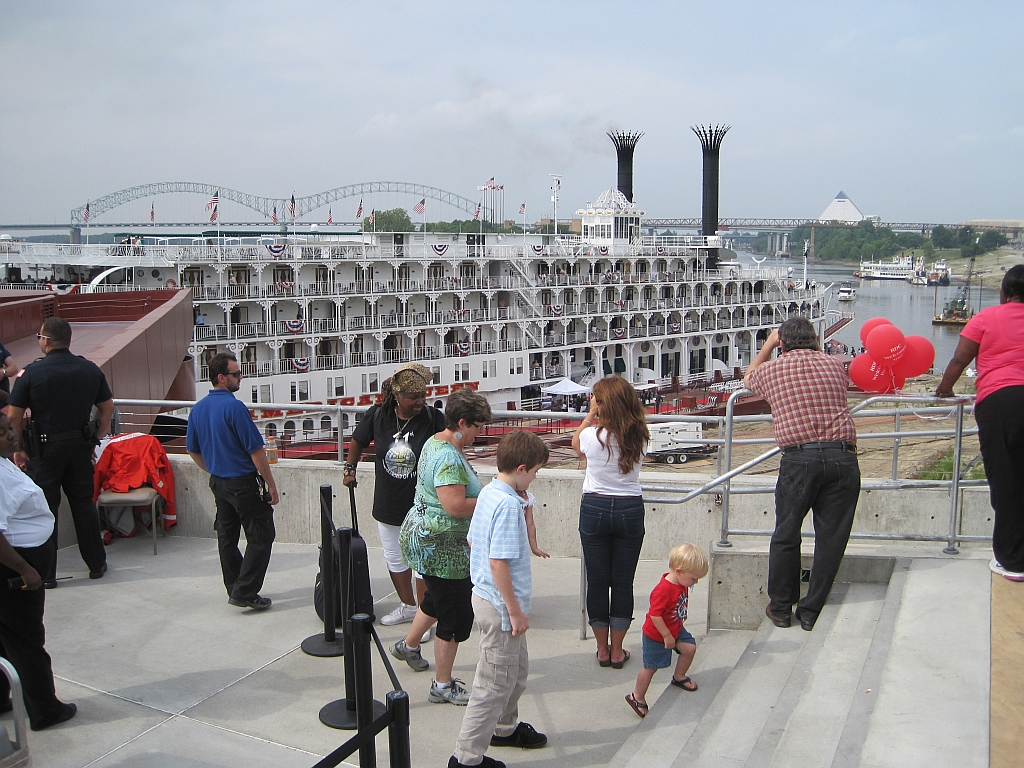
American Queen docked in Memphis, Tennessee in April 2012.

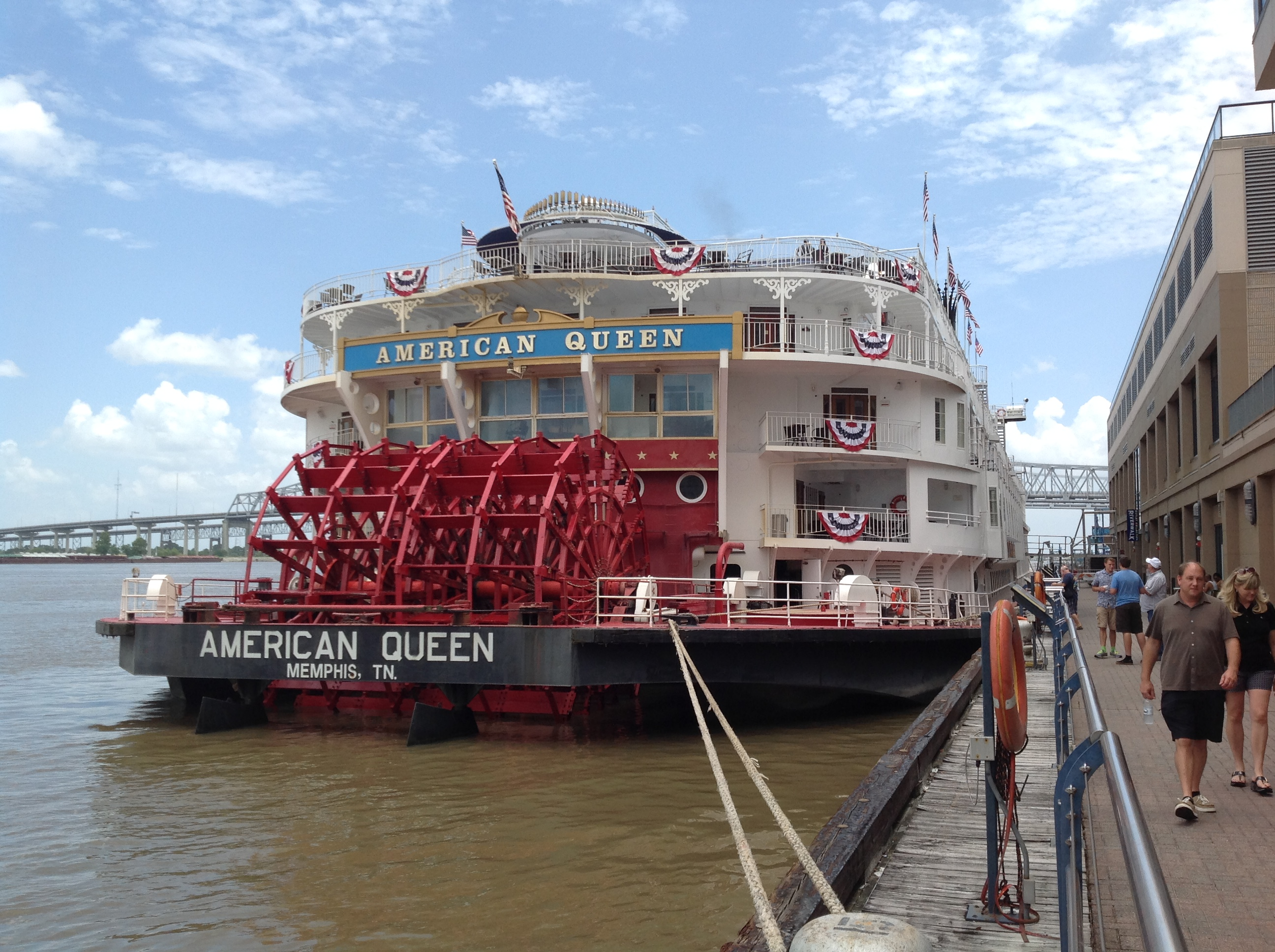
Stern view of American Queen docked in New Orleans, Louisiana in June 2015.

== Media appearances ==
In 2007, American Queen was the subject of an episode of the Discovery Channel TV series Superships.

In 2009, American Queen was featured in an episode of Little People, Big World in which the Roloff family took a cruise aboard the vessel.

In 2018, American Queen was featured in an episode of Cruising with Jane McDonald. The show followed British singer Jane McDonald on a cruise aboard the American Queen from New Orleans to Memphis.

== See also ==
- American Empress
- American Duchess
- American Countess
- Delta Queen
- Mississippi Queen
