= Cape Spencer Light (Alaska) =

Lighthouse in Alaska, United States

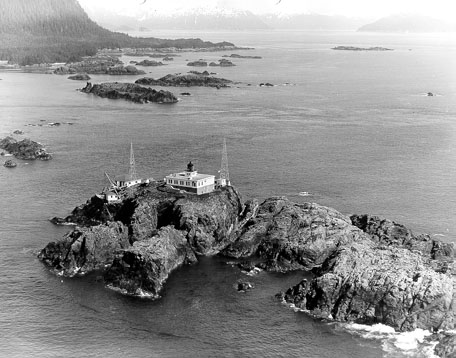
- Location: Cross Sound; Glacier Bay National Park and Preserve; Yakutat, Alaska
- Coordinates: 58.19891°N 136.64018°W

Tower
- Constructed: 1925
- Foundation: rock
- Construction: reinforced concrete
- Automated: 1974
- Height: 25 feet (7.6 m)
- Shape: flat-roofed house with short tower on top
- Markings: art deco architecture white tower, black balcony and lantern
- Operator: Glacier Bay National Park and Preserve
- Heritage: National Register of Historic Places listed place

Light
- Focal height: 105 feet (32 m)
- Lens: Third order Fresnel lens
- Range: 17 nautical miles (31 km; 20 mi)
- Characteristic: Fl W 6s.abr> emergency light (Fl W 6s) of reduced intensity if main light is extinguished.
- Cape Spencer Lighthouse
- U.S. National Register of Historic Places
- Alaska Heritage Resources Survey
- Area: less than one acre
- NRHP reference No.: 75002160
- AHRS No.: XMF-042
- Added to NRHP: December 4, 1975

The Cape Spencer Light is a lighthouse in Alaska, United States, next to the entrance to Cross Sound and Icy Strait. The light is still an active aid to navigation. It is located on an islet in the southernmost end of Glacier Bay National Park and Preserve.

== History ==
A beacon at Cape Spencer was requested as early as 1906, but it was not until 1912 that this rocky region received its first light—an unmanned acetylene lantern. Funds for a lighthouse to properly mark Cape Spencer were later granted, and construction commenced in May 1924. A single-story reinforced concrete building (51’ x 62’) was built at the summit of the rocky mass to house both the fog signal equipment and the keepers. From the center of the structure's roof, a 14-by-14-foot tower rose another twenty-five feet. The Coast Guard removed the Fresnel lens from Cape Spencer in 1974, the same year in which the lighthouse was automated. The small lighthouse, perched atop the seventy-foot-tall rock, is still considered an important navigational aid and receives regular Coast Guard visits.

When manned the crew of Cape Spencer light consisted of four men. One was a First Class Boatswain's Mate (commanding), a Second Class Engineman, a Seaman and a Fireman. Each man was assigned a tour of duty on the island which lasted one year. Under normal conditions, no crewman ever left during this period. Each crewman had his own bedroom and stood a four-hour watch. Not only was the light maintained but a permanent radio watch was kept.

Supplies were provided by buoy tender operating out of Ketchikan. Each crew member was allowed a per diem amount which was pooled and set aside in an account which could be used to purchase food from a civilian food store in Ketchikan. Generally, the men ate very well, depending on their cooking skills. The basement of the light structure contained a large food storage room as well as a couple of freezers for frozen foods. The resupply was done every two weeks, weather and other missions allowing. There were periods of over three weeks without any resupply ship. This was difficult not only for the food situation but for lack of mail and a new supply of movies, no other entertainment being available the station being 100 miles (160 km) west of Juneau.

The station was powered by three Caterpillar Diesel Generator sets. One ran at all times providing power for the station. Multiple storage tanks were situated around the station to hold fuel for these generators. On a lower level from the station was a boat house and a crane engine building. The crane was operated by another Caterpillar engine. The island had no landing place with sheer cliffs rising on all sides. To get on or off the island, other than by helicopter, the crane was hooked up to a sixteen-foot fiberglass boat with an outboard engine, The men would climb into the boat and be swung by the crane over the edge of the island and dropped the sixty feet to the water. To get back on the boat had to be maneuvered under the hook at the base of the cliff, attached and lifted back up. Needless to say this was not any easy feat and was seldom done in rough weather. Resupply was accomplished the same way, hoisting cargo nets of supplies up onto the boathouse deck.

To get men back and forth from Juneau, the boat would bring them into Dicks Arm, a fjord, located about a mile from the island which shelter provided a calm landing place for bush pilots to bring float planes in. Dicks Arm was also used for recreation for the men on the light when they could get off. It teemed with black bear, grizzlies and had Dall sheep on the higher slopes. The waters were full of giant halibut, salmon in season and giant king crabs. Seals basked on the rocky islands around the light and occasional pods of killer whales would pass between the light and shore.

Considered "isolated duty", Cape Spencer was still not the worst nor most isolated post manned by the Coast Guard.

It was the first lighthouse in Alaska to be given radiobeacon facilities, in 1926.

The lighthouse was listed on the National Register of Historic Places in 1975.

== See also ==
- National Register of Historic Places listings in Hoonah–Angoon Census Area, Alaska
