= American Duchess =

American river cruise

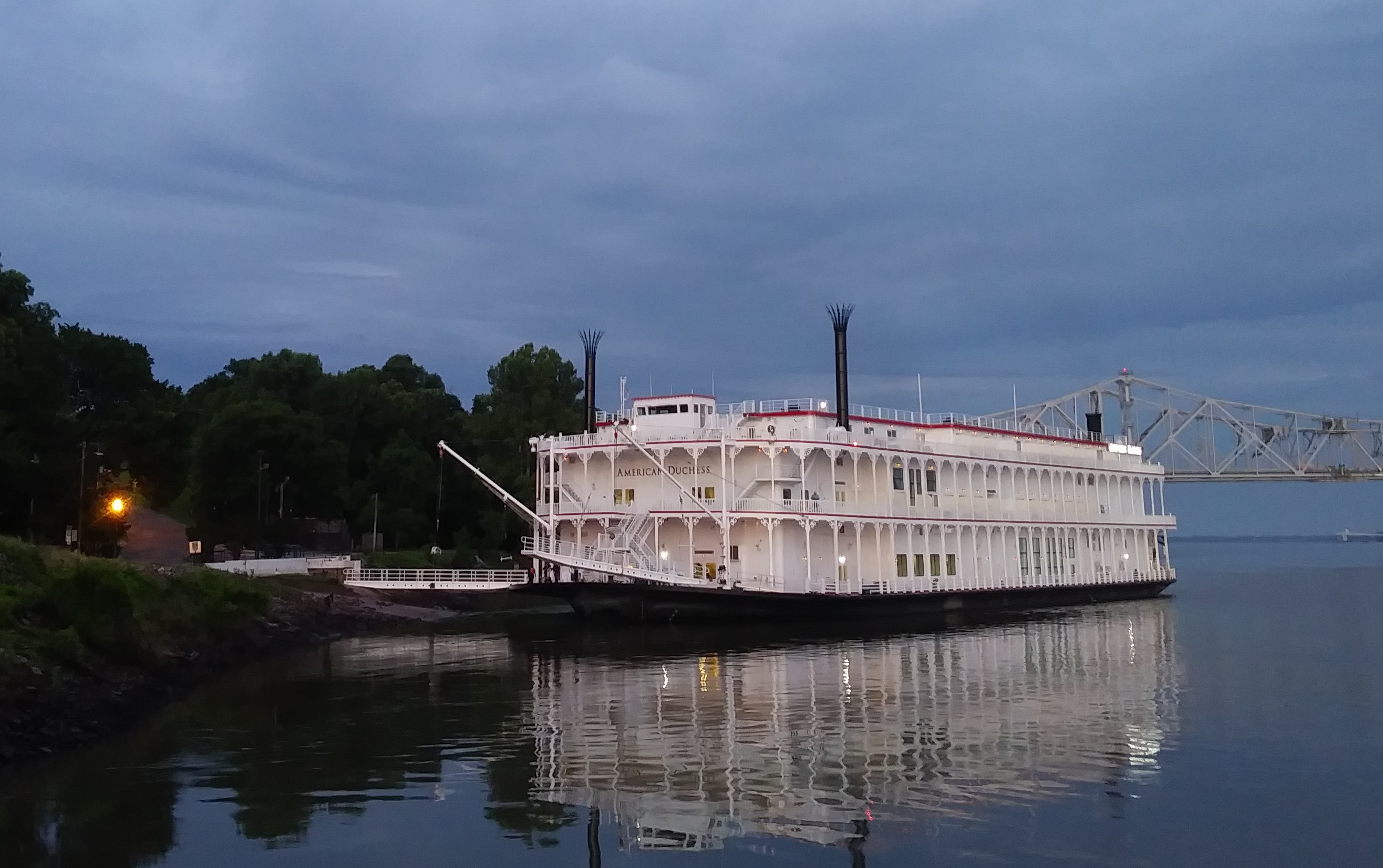

History
- Name: Bettendorf Capri (1995–2016); American Duchess (2016–present)
- Owner: Isle of Capri Casinos (1995–2016); American Queen Steamboat Company (2016–2024); American Cruise Lines (2024-present)
- Port of registry: Memphis, Tennessee, US
- Builder: Nichols Bros. Boat Builders
- Launched: 1995
- Identification: MMSI number: 367755720; Callsign: WDJ2153

General characteristics
- Length: 341 ft (104 m)
- Beam: 98 ft (30 m)
- Decks: 4
- Propulsion: Stern paddle wheel, diesel electric Z-drives
- Capacity: 166 passengers
- Crew: 80

American Duchess is a river cruise paddlewheeler owned by American Cruise Lines. The vessel entered the overnight cruise market as the third addition to the now-defunct American Queen Steamboat Company fleet and was advertised as being the most luxurious option of the line's vessels. The riverboat's itineraries included routes on the Mississippi, Ohio, Tennessee, Cumberland and Illinois Rivers.

== Bettendorf Capri (1995–2016) ==
Before it was American Duchess, this vessel was originally designed and built for Isle of Capri Casinos as a casino boat named Bettendorf Capri.

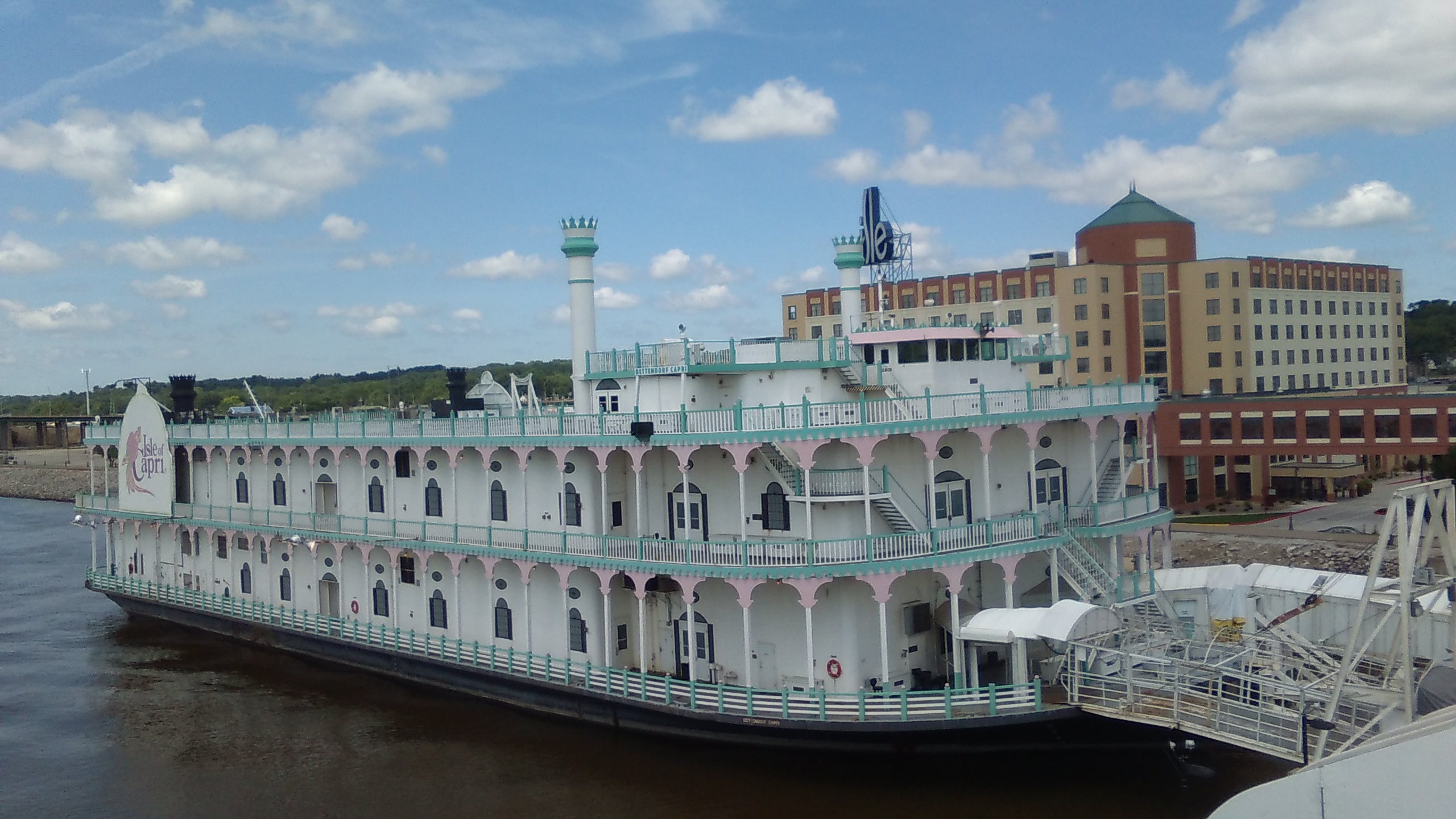
Bettendorf Capri at her home dock in Bettendorf, Iowa on August 5, 2016

After going land-based, Isle of Capri sold the boat to AQSC in 2016. On October 16, 2016, Bettendorf locals gathered on the levee to give their farewell to the 21 year-old casino boat and watched her pull off the river bank to sail south to undergo her reconstruction. Contracted to Bollinger Shipyards in Morgan City, Louisiana, the vessel would be gutted, remodeled and relaunched as a river cruiseliner the following year. The conversion from a casino boat to an overnight passenger vessel involved the removal of over 1,000 slot machine bases and 1,200 steel chairs, the construction of new dividing walls to form 83 passenger cabins, the addition of a crew hold, a completely new interior layout and design, modifications to propulsion and a new exterior paint job.

== Introduction as American Duchess ==
On August 14, 2017, at the New Orleans waterfront, American Duchess was christened with a bottle of Maker's Mark bourbon by Marissa Applegate, daughter of AQSC CEO John Waggoner. Former Maker's Mark chairman Bill Samuels Jr. also attended the christening and in his speech likened the christening to that of Cunard's 2010 christening of MS Queen Elizabeth with a bottle of Scotch whiskey.

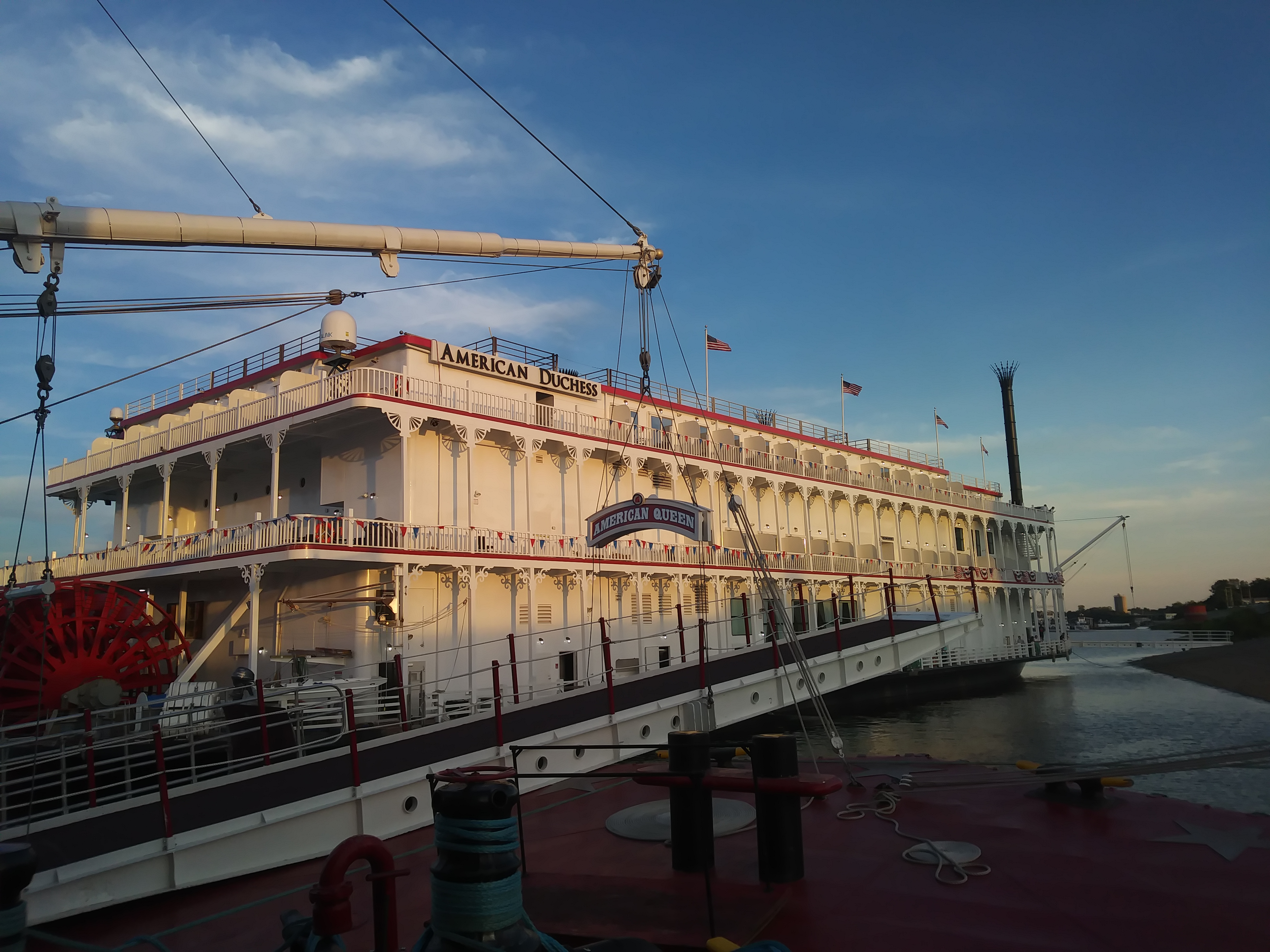
American Duchess in Paducah, Kentucky docking next to American Queen for the first time on August 24, 2017

American Duchess became the third of four vessels within the AQSC fleet, succeeding American Queen and American Empress, and preceding the 2021 launch of American Countess.

American Duchess was slated to make mostly the same routes as American Queen, with two unique destinations being the city of Nashville, Tennessee and the Illinois River up to Ottawa, Illinois. American Queen has not visited Nashville since 2014, though she did make an unexpected cruise to Ottawa, Illinois in 2018 due to high water conditions on the Upper Mississippi.

In 2021, Hallmark Channel released the Christmas movie 'Every Time a Bell Rings' which was set in Natchez, Mississippi and featured scenes filmed aboard American Duchess.

== Economic impact and resale of American Duchess ==
American Duchess has been welcomed and praised by many river towns in the United States for her and her sister vessels' contributions to local economies. The rising popularity of U.S. river cruising has brought tourist dollars into smaller, lesser known U.S. towns from travelers worldwide. In 2018, the combined presence of American Queen and American Duchess brought over $2 million to the economy of Vicksburg, Mississippi. Jim Palmeri of the American Queen's shore excursions company estimated that the total of 16,537 people brought to Vicksburg during that year by AQSC had spent an average of $76 per person in the city. During a 2019 visit to Point Pleasant, West Virginia, Denny Bellamy of the city's visitor's bureau expressed his appeasement of the increasing frequency of riverboat visits to the town. Bellamy referred to the passengers' experiences in town as a legitimization of Point Pleasant as a tourist destination. He also spoke of his aspiration for the city to become a "truck stop for boats."

In June 2023, American Duchess was pulled from service, and it was announced in February 2024 that operator American Queen Voyages would file bankruptcy and cease all operations immediately. In March 2024, American Duchess was purchased by American Cruise Lines for $200,000. It is to be scrapped without further use.
