= Pleasant Island (Alaska) =

Island in the United States of America

Coordinates: 58°21′20″N 135°38′53″W

Native name: Wanachích
- Interactive map of Pleasant Island

Geography
- Location: Icy Strait
- Archipelago: Alexander Archipelago
- Area: 49 km^{2} (19 sq mi)

Administration
- United States
- State: Alaska
- Census Area: Hoonah–Angoon Census Area

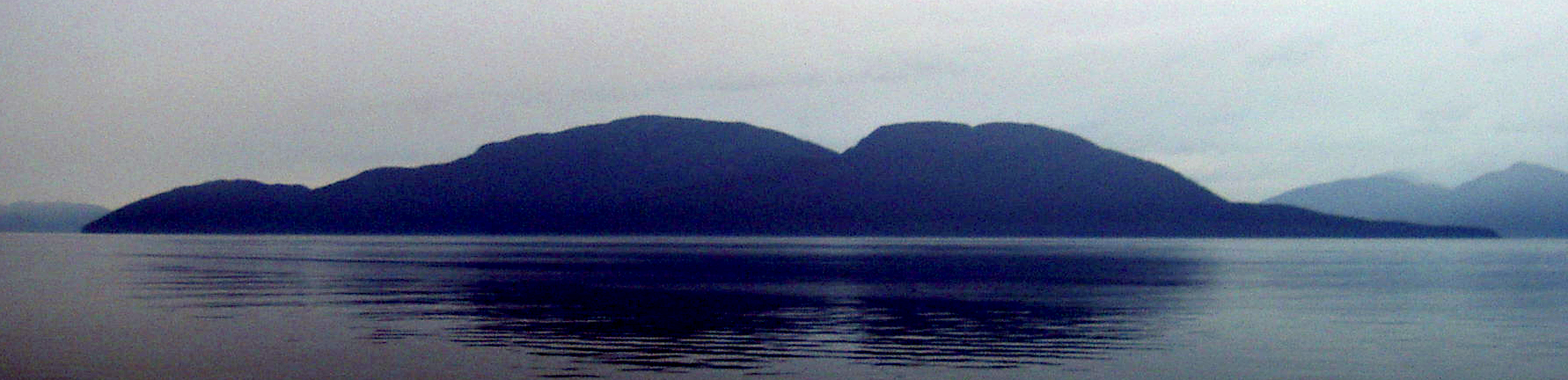
Pleasant Island in 2011, mirrored in the waters of Icy Strait

Pleasant Island (Lingít: Wanachích) is an uninhabited island between northern Chichagof Island and the mainland of the Alaska Panhandle. It lies southeast of the mainland city of Gustavus and southwest of the mainland community of Excursion Inlet. Pleasant Island is the largest island in the Icy Strait, just south of Glacier Bay National Park.

== Etymology ==
Pleasant Island was named in 1879 by William Healey Dall of the United States Geological Survey because of its "pleasant shore". The name was first published in the 1883 Coast Pilot.

== Geography ==
Pleasant Island has a land area of 49 km^{2} (19 mi^{2}). It is the largest island in the Pleasant/Lemesurier/Inian Islands Wilderness, a 23,151-acre (93.69 km^{2}) wilderness area within Tongass National Forest. It is relatively flat, with its highest point, The Knob, reaching a height of 600 feet. The island has several freshwater streams and lakes.

== History ==
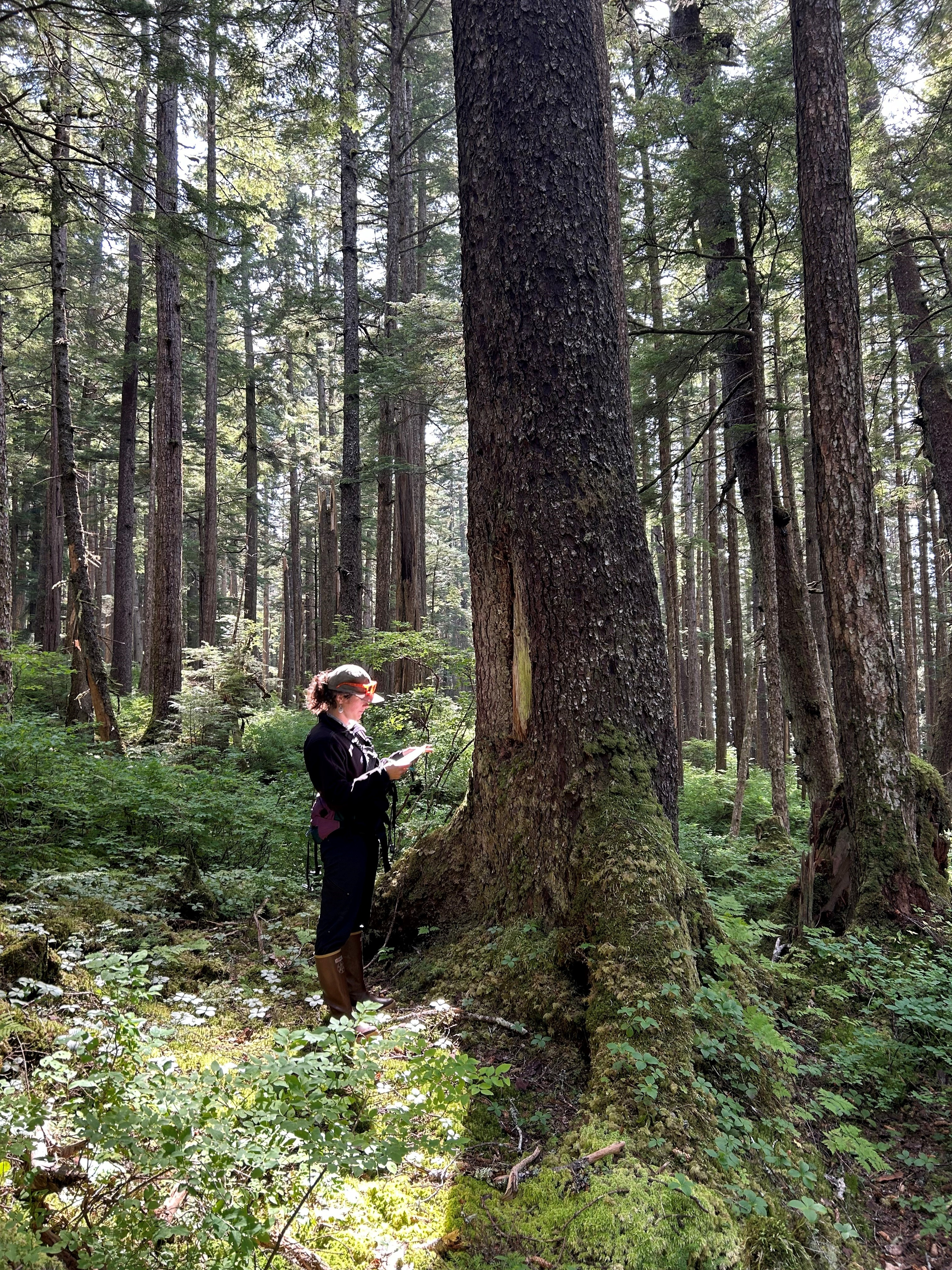
A researcher documents a culturally modified tree on Pleasant Island.

Pleasant Island lies within the traditional territory of the Huna Tlingit. Oral histories indicate that the Tlingit have historically used Pleasant Island for a variety of subsistence activities, such as fishing, hunting, and berrying. A 1946 Indian land claims document, "Possessory Rights of the Natives of Southwest Alaska" by Walter Goldschmidt and Theodore Haas, records local accounts of Native houses on the island's northern shore.

In 1925, Pleasant Island was added to Tongass National Forest by presidential proclamation as part of a major expansion which included over one million acres surrounding the newly created Glacier Bay National Monument. In the late 20th century, the waters surrounding Pleasant Island saw intense Tanner crab fishing, driven by high demand from the Japanese market.

The residents of nearby Gustavus continue to use Pleasant Island for recreation and subsistence. The community's reliance on Pleasant Island was one of several motivations behind the 2012 annexation of Icy Passage by Gustavus; Icy Passage is the sole access corridor to the island.

== Climate and ecology ==
Pleasant Island is characterized by a cool, maritime climate, with an average annual precipitation of 1400mm. Average temperatures range from −7 °C to 17 °C.

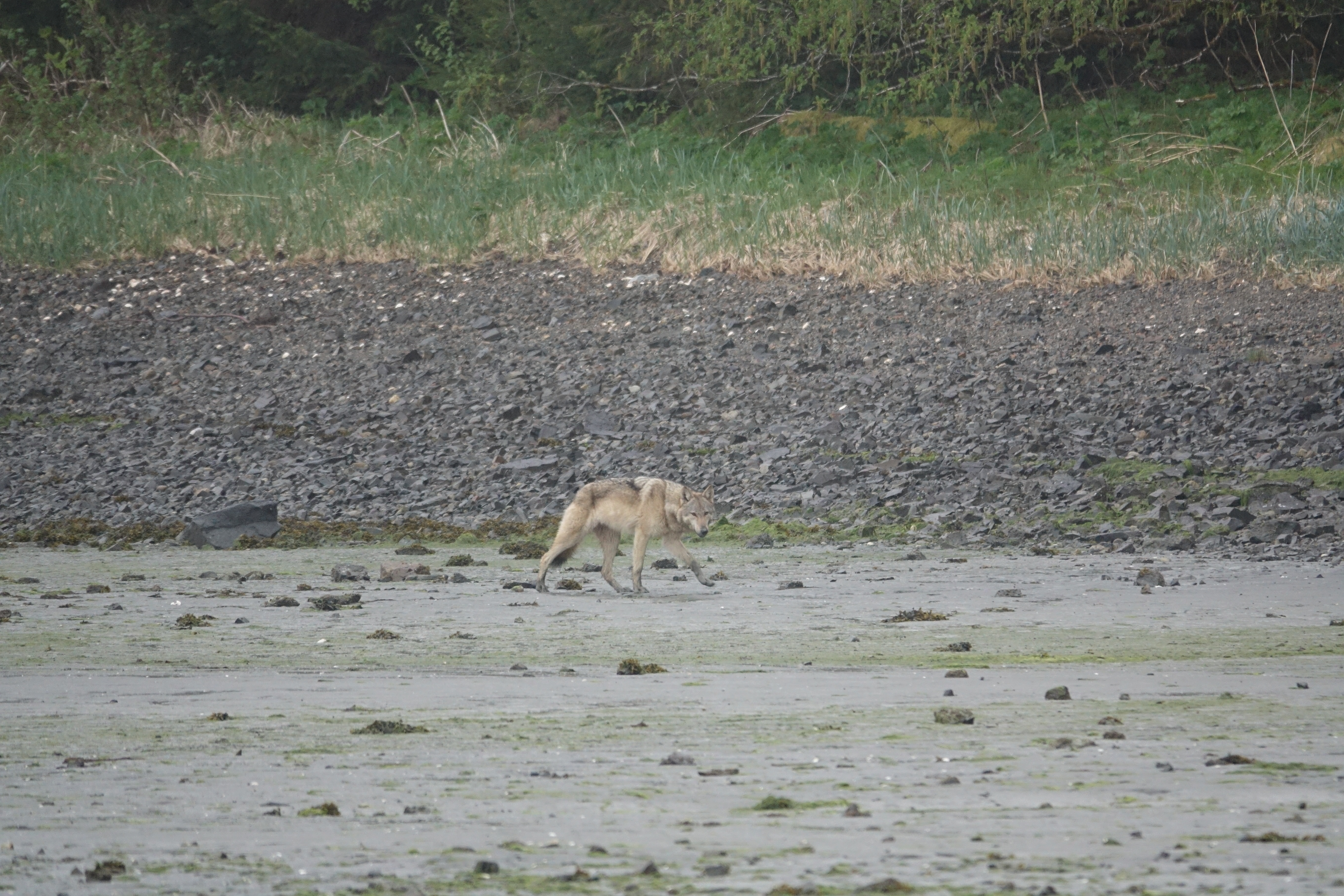
A wolf foraging in the intertidal zone on Pleasant Island.

The coastal areas of Pleasant Island are dominated by western hemlock and Sitka spruce. The groundcover includes dense populations of Alaska blueberry, rusty menziesia, Lysichiton americanus, and Cornus canadensis. Other present, but less dominant species include red huckleberry, Rubus pedatus, Lycopodium annotinum, Maianthemum dilatatum, and Coptis aspleniifolia. The higher ground areas, above 45 meters elevation, are mostly covered by muskeg, with occasional lodgepole pine; many species of vascular plants can be found there, including Empetrum nigrum, Cornus suecica, Oxycoccus microcarpus, Eriophorum angustifolium, Carex aquatilis, Vaccinium vitis-idaea, and Rhododendron groenlandicum.

Pleasant Island's terrestrial fauna includes a resident gray wolf pack that established on the island around 2013, leading to the extirpation of the Sitka black-tailed deer population by 2018. As ungulate prey declined, the wolves shifted to feeding heavily on sea otters.

== Access ==
The wilderness is accessible by boat, kayak or float plane.

== Facilities ==
There are no public cabins, shelters or maintained trails on the islands.
