= Dicks Arm =

Bay in Alaska, United States

Coordinates: 58°12′45″N 136°39′30″W

Dicks Arm is a bay in Hoonah–Angoon Census Area, Alaska, in the United States. The inlet is located on Cross Sound.

It was named in 1901 by a member of the United States Coast and Geodetic Survey.
