= Cross Sound =

Coordinates: 58°10′40″N 136°30′36″W

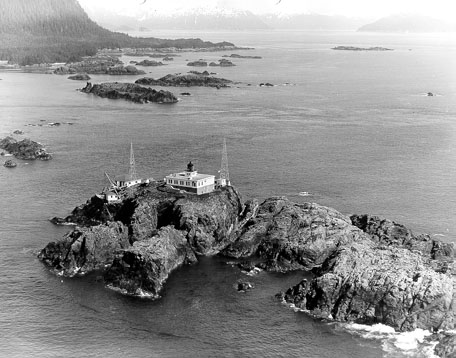
Aerial view of Cape Spencer Light, on the north side Cross Sound

Cross Sound is a passage in the Alexander Archipelago in the southeastern region of the U.S. state of Alaska, located between Chichagof Island to its south and the mainland to its north. It is 48 km (30 mi) long and extends from the Gulf of Alaska to Icy Strait.

Cross Sound was named by James Cook in 1778 because he found it on May 3, designated on his calendar as Holy Cross Day.

The Cape Spencer Light marks the north side of the entrance to the sound from the Gulf of Alaska.

Dicks Arm is an inlet on northern Cross Sound.
