= American Empress =

Paddle-wheel boat

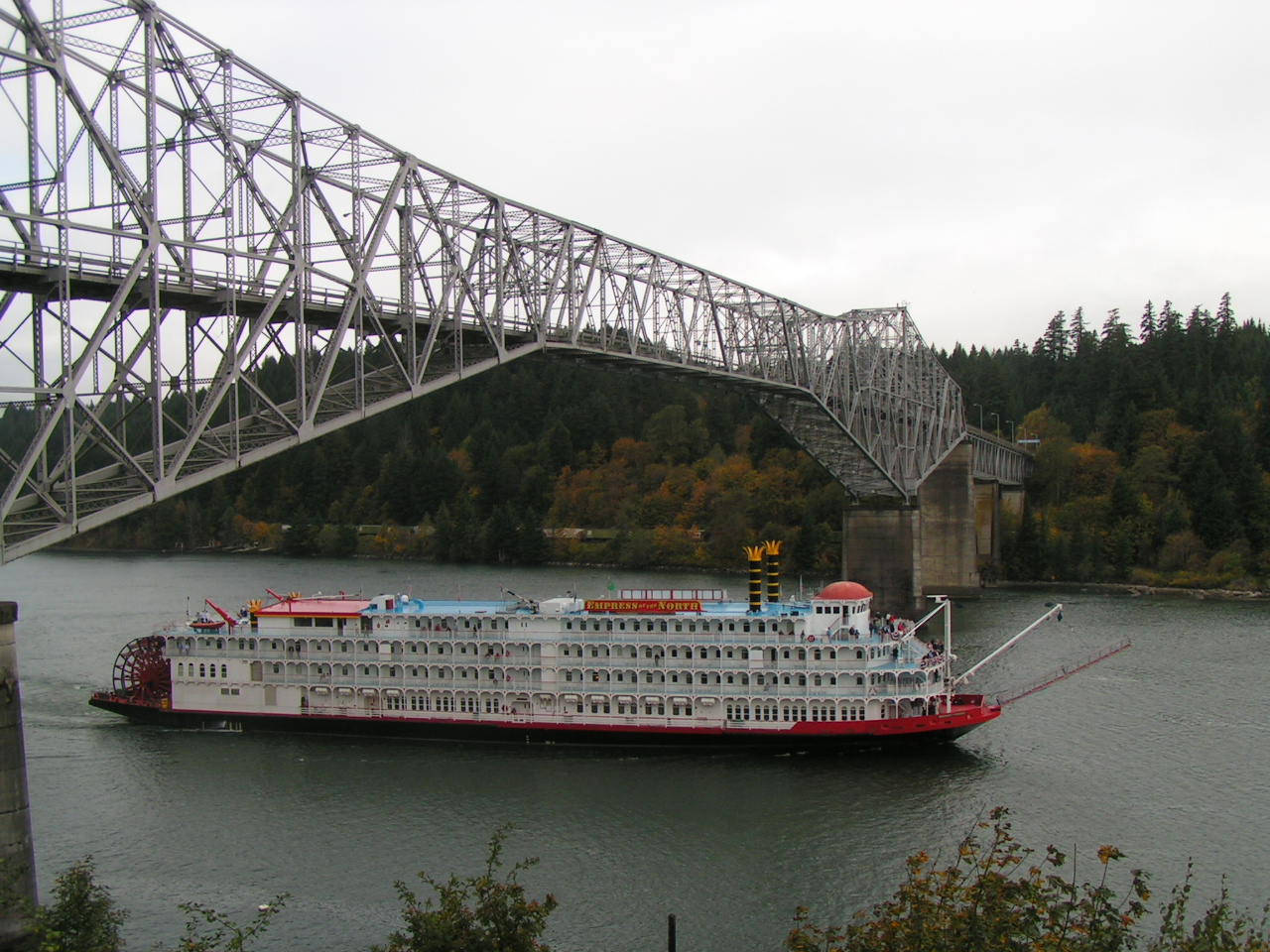
- Empress of the North on the Columbia River in 2005

History
- Name: 2003–2013: Empress of the North; 2014–present: American Empress
- Owner: 2013–present: American Queen Steamboat Company
- Port of registry: Juneau, Alaska, United States
- Builder: Nichols Bros. Boat Builders - Freeland, Washington
- Cost: US $50 million (2003)
- In service: 2003
- Home port: Vancouver, Washington, USA (2014)
- Identification: Call sign WDH3834; IMO number: 9263538; MMSI number: 366902410

General characteristics
- Class & type: River cruise ship
- Tonnage: 5,975 GT
- Length: 360 ft (110 m)
- Beam: 59 ft (18 m)
- Draft: 12 ft 6 in (3.81 m)

American Empress is a 360-foot (110 m) diesel-electric powered paddle-wheeler that was formerly operated by Majestic America Line and named the Empress of the North. She was built in 2002 at the Nichols Brothers Boat Builders shipyard on Whidbey Island, in the U.S. state of Washington, for $50 million and debuted as a cruise ship in 2003. She is listed as accommodating 223 guests, and originally cruised Alaska's Inside Passage, the Pacific Northwest, and the Columbia River. While being operated by Majestic America Line, the ship was decorated with a 19th century Russian theme, but with Alaskan touches in the form of carvings and masks.

During the ship's time in Alaska, several smaller port cities such as Wrangell and Petersburg depended on the visits by the Empress of the North for a substantial amount of tourist-related commerce.

In 2013, the Empress of the North was acquired by the American Queen Steamboat Company, which in 2014 renamed the ship American Empress and placed her back into service on the Columbia and Snake Rivers, after five years out of service. The ship's home port is now Vancouver, Washington.

== Grounding incidents ==
During her years as the Empress of the North, the ship ran aground five times. She hit bottom during her launching from the yard when the restraint system failed and some of the boat builders had to jump in the waters of Puget Sound to avoid being run over. She struck a navigation lock in October 2003 at the Ice Harbor Dam on the Snake River, and suffered another grounding in November 2003 near The Dalles in the Columbia River. She grounded again in March 2006 near Washougal in the Columbia River.

Early on May 14, 2007, the Empress of the North struck Rocky Island while navigating a 90-degree turn to starboard about 50 nautical miles (90 km) from Juneau, Alaska in Icy Strait. She began taking on water, forcing all 248 passengers to abandon ship. Reports that the vessel either grounded on Hanus Reef, several miles away, or later drifted there were in error. Several fishing boats, a tugboat and barge, another small cruise ship, and the Coast Guard Cutter Liberty evacuated the Empress' passengers, who were eventually transferred to the Alaska Marine Highway ferry Columbia. There were no injuries, and the rescue effort took place in relatively favorable conditions, amid intermittent rain showers and light winds. Though the Empress of the North had developed a 6-degree list, 33 members of the crew stayed aboard to facilitate the vessel's return to Juneau under her own power. She was escorted en route there by Coast Guard helicopter and a third small cruise ship. The National Transportation Safety Board undertook a multi-month investigation, concluding that the "probable cause" of the accident was primarily the inexperience of a ship's officer. The Empress of the North was repaired at the shipyards of Vigor Industrial in Portland, Oregon, by Vigor Marine LLC, and returned to service on July 7, 2007.

== Renaming and return to service (2014) ==
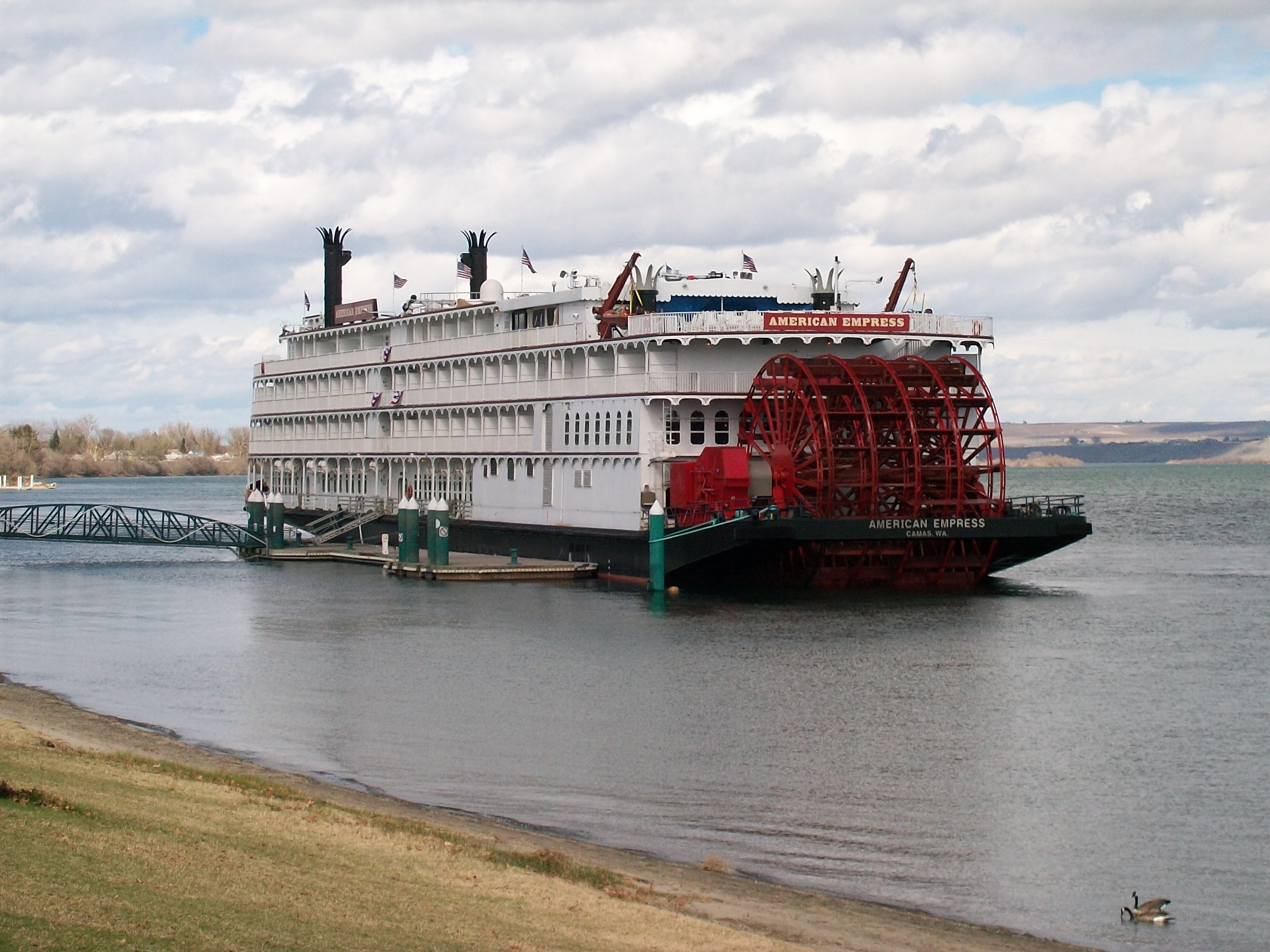
A 2014 stern view of the ship, now re-lettered as American Empress, at Howard Amon Park in Richland, Washington, a few days before returning to service

The American Queen Steamboat Company, owner and operator of the U.S-flagged American Queen, announced on May 22, 2013, that it had purchased the Empress of the North from the U.S. Maritime Administration (MARAD) and that it would rename the ship American Empress and resume sailings from Portland, Oregon, in April 2014. On April 5, 2014, American Empress was christened in Portland. The Empress had been out of service for five years. She is the largest overnight riverboat west of the Mississippi River. The ship's home port is now Vancouver, Washington (in the Portland metropolitan area) and her normal route will follow the Columbia and Snake Rivers between Astoria, Oregon, and Clarkston, Washington, with 32 sailings scheduled for 2014, in the period April–November. Last in service for American Queen Voyages on the Columbia and Snake Rivers, the 2003-built riverboat was acquired by the American Cruise Line (ACL) during an auction in 2024. After spending nearly two years sitting in limbo, the 223-passenger vessel as of July 2026 is reportedly being scrapped in Alaska.

== See also ==
- Tourist sternwheelers of Oregon
- List of river cruise ships
