= Chichagof Island =

Island in Alaska, United States

Chichagof
Native name: Shee Kaax
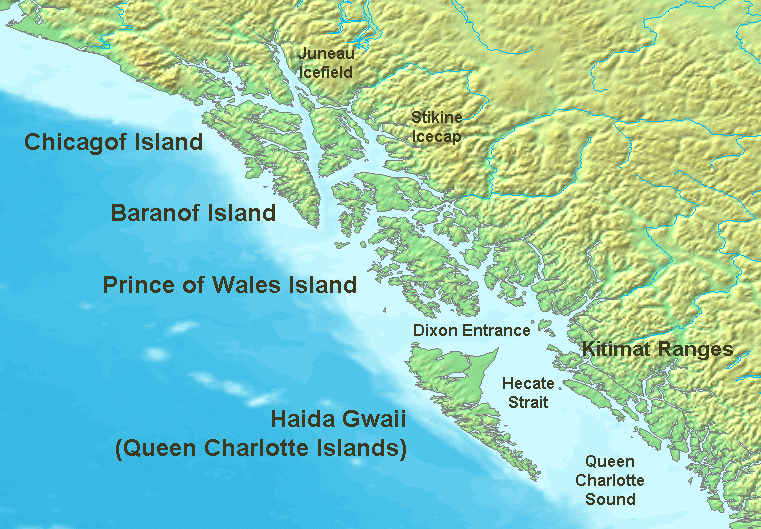
- Islands and major straits of the northern Pacific Northwest Coast

- Location within Alaska

Geography
- Location: ABC islands of Alaska
- Coordinates: 57°52′25″N 135°46′35″W
- Archipelago: Alexander Archipelago
- Area: 2,048.61 sq mi (5,305.9 km^{2})
- Length: 75 mi (121 km)
- Width: 50 mi (80 km)
- Highest elevation: 3,909 ft (1191.5 m)

Administration
- United States
- State: Alaska
- Borough/Census Area: Hoonah-Angoon Census Area and Sitka City and Borough

Demographics
- Population: 1342 (2000)
- Pop. density: 0.25/km^{2} (0.65/sq mi)

Chichagof Island (Russian: Остров Чичагова), or Shee Kaax, is an island in the Alexander Archipelago of the Alaska Panhandle. At 75 miles (121 km) long and 50 miles (80 km) wide, it has a land area of 2,048.61 square miles (5,305.9 km^{2}), making it the fifth largest island in the United States and the 109th largest island in the world. Its coastline measures 742 miles. There was a 2000 census population of 1,342 persons. It is one of the ABC islands of Alaska. Chichagof Island has the highest population of bears per square mile of any place on Earth.

Chichagof Island is directly north of Baranof Island, with Peril Strait separating the two islands. It is bounded by Chatham Strait to the east, Icy Strait to the northeast, Cross Sound to the northwest, and the Gulf of Alaska to the west.

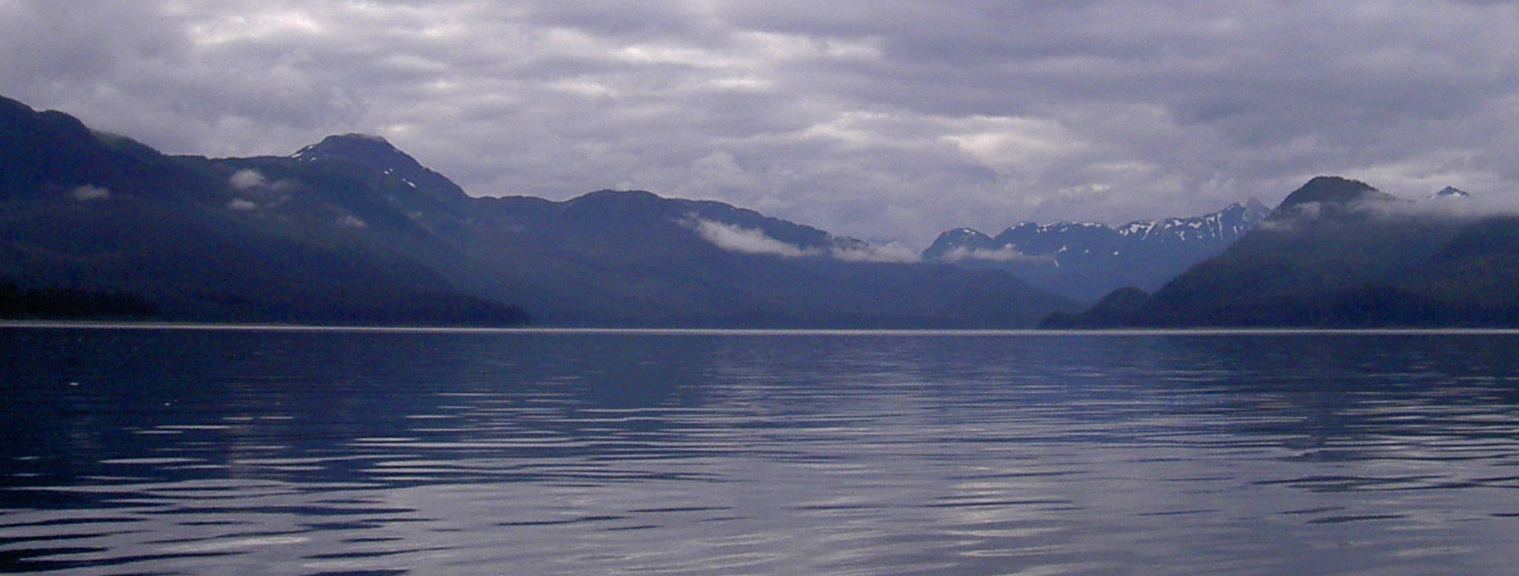
Idaho Inlet into Chichagof Island in August 2011.

The communities of Hoonah, Pelican, Tenakee Springs, and Elfin Cove are all located on the northern half of Chichagof Island, in the Hoonah-Angoon Census Area. The island's southern half comprises the northern part of the City and Borough of Sitka. Only eight persons were counted in this portion of Sitka at the 2000 census. The primary economic sources for all these communities come from either Chichagof Island or the waters and fjords surrounding it. Commercial fishing, guided hunting trips, charter fishing and logging are all vital economic facets of the local economies.

This island is named after Admiral Vasili Chichagov, a Russian Arctic explorer who never visited Alaska. The entire island lies within the limits of Tongass National Forest. The western coastal portion has been officially designated as the West Chichagof-Yakobi Wilderness.
