= Borders of the oceans =

Limits of Earth's oceanic waters

Maps exhibiting the world's oceanic waters. A continuous body of water encircling Earth, the World/Global Ocean is divided into a number of principal areas. Five oceanic divisions are usually recognized: Pacific, Atlantic, Indian, Arctic, and Southern/Antarctic; the last two listed are sometimes consolidated into the first three.

The borders of the oceans are the limits of Earth's oceanic waters. The definition and number of oceans can vary depending on the adopted criteria. The principal divisions (in descending order of area) of the five oceans are the Pacific Ocean, Atlantic Ocean, Indian Ocean, Southern (Antarctic) Ocean, and Arctic Ocean. Smaller regions of the oceans are called seas, gulfs, bays, straits, and other terms. Geologically, an ocean is an area of oceanic crust covered by water.

== Overview ==
Though generally described as several separate oceans, the world's oceanic waters constitute one global, interconnected body of salt water sometimes referred to as the World Ocean or Global Ocean. This concept of a continuous body of water with relatively free interchange among its parts is of fundamental importance to oceanography.

The major oceanic divisions are defined in part by the continents, various archipelagos, and other criteria. The principal divisions (in descending order of area) are the: Pacific Ocean, Atlantic Ocean, Indian Ocean, Southern (Antarctic) Ocean, and Arctic Ocean. Smaller regions of the oceans are called seas, gulfs, bays, straits, and other terms.

Geologically, an ocean is an area of oceanic crust covered by water. Oceanic crust is the thin layer of solidified volcanic basalt that covers the Earth's mantle. Continental crust is thicker but less dense. From this perspective, the Earth has three oceans: the World Ocean, the Caspian Sea, and the Black Sea. The latter two were formed by the collision of Cimmeria with Laurasia. The Mediterranean Sea is at times a discrete ocean because tectonic plate movement has repeatedly broken its connection to the World Ocean through the Strait of Gibraltar. The Black Sea is connected to the Mediterranean through the Bosporus, but the Bosporus is a natural canal cut through continental rock some 7,000 years ago, rather than a piece of oceanic sea floor like the Strait of Gibraltar.

Despite their names, some smaller landlocked "seas" are not connected with the World Ocean, such as the Caspian Sea (which is nevertheless, geologically, itself a full-fledged ocean—see above) and numerous salt lakes such as the Aral Sea.

A complete hierarchy showing which seas belong to which oceans, according to the International Hydrographic Organization (IHO), is available at the European Marine Gazetteer website. See also the list of seas article for the seas included in each ocean area. Also note there are many varying definitions of the world's seas and no single authority.

=== List of oceans ===
The world ocean is divided into a number of principal oceanic areas that are delimited by the continents and various oceanographic features: these divisions are the Atlantic Ocean, Arctic Ocean (sometimes considered an estuary of the Atlantic), Indian Ocean, Pacific Ocean, and the Southern Ocean, defined by the International Hydrographic Organization (IHO) in 2000, the latter being a relatively new addition identified with a distinct ecosystem and a unique impact on global climate. In turn, oceanic waters are interspersed by many smaller seas, gulfs, and bays.

If viewed from the southern pole of Earth, the Atlantic, Indian, and Pacific Oceans can be seen as lobes extending northward from the Southern Ocean. Farther north, the Atlantic opens into the Arctic Ocean, which is connected to the Pacific by the Bering Strait, forming a continuous expanse of water.

The five oceans are:

- The Pacific Ocean, the largest of the oceans, also reaches northward from the Southern Ocean to the Arctic Ocean. It spans the gap between Australia and Asia, and the Americas. The Pacific Ocean meets the Atlantic Ocean south of South America at Cape Horn.
- The Atlantic Ocean, the second largest, extends from the Southern Ocean between the Americas, and Africa and Europe, to the Arctic Ocean. The Atlantic Ocean meets the Indian Ocean south of Africa at Cape Agulhas.
- The Indian Ocean, the third largest, extends northward from the Southern Ocean to India, the Arabian Peninsula, and Southeast Asia in Asia, and between Africa in the west and Australia in the east. The Indian Ocean joins the Pacific Ocean to the east, near Australia at South East Cape.
- The Arctic Ocean is the smallest of the five. It joins the Atlantic Ocean near Greenland and Iceland and joins the Pacific Ocean at the Bering Strait. It overlies the North Pole, touching North America in the Western Hemisphere and Scandinavia and Siberia in the Eastern Hemisphere. The Arctic Ocean is partially covered in sea ice, the extent of which varies according to the season.
- The Southern Ocean is a proposed ocean surrounding Antarctica, dominated by the Antarctic Circumpolar Current, generally the ocean south of 60 degrees south latitude. The Southern Ocean is partially covered in sea ice, the extent of which varies according to the season. The Southern Ocean is the second smallest of the five named oceans.

== Arctic Ocean ==
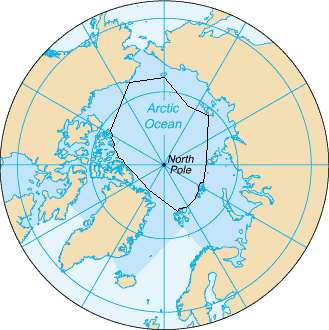
The borders of the Arctic Ocean, according to the CIA World Factbook (blue area), and as defined by the IHO (black outline – excluding marginal waterbodies)

The Arctic Ocean covers much of the Arctic and washes upon Northern America and Eurasia. It is sometimes considered a sea or estuary of the Atlantic Ocean.

The International Hydrographic Organization (IHO) defines the limits of the Arctic Ocean (excluding the seas it contains) as follows:

Between Greenland and West Spitsbergen [sic] – The Northern limit of Greenland Sea. (Note: Defined by IHO as "A line joining the Northernmost point of Spitsbergen [sic] [Svalbard] to the Northernmost point of Greenland.")

Between West Spitsbergen and North East Land – the parallel of lat. 80° N.

From Cape Leigh Smith to Cape Kohlsaat – the Northern limit of Barents Sea [sic]. (Note: Defined by IHO as "Cape Leigh Smith across the Islands Bolshoy Ostrov (Great Island) [Storøya], Gilles [Kvitøya] and Victoria; Cape Mary Harmsworth (Southwestern extremity of Alexandra Land) along the northern coasts of Franz-Josef Land as far as Cape Kohlsaat (81° 14′ N, 65° 10′ E).")

From Cape Kohlsaat to Cape Molotov – the Northern limit of Kara Sea. (Note: Defined by IHO as "Cape Kohlsaat to Cape Molotov (81° 16′ N, 93° 43′ E) (Northern extremity of Severnaya Zemlya on Komsomolets Island).")

From Cape Molotov to the Northern extremity of Kotelni Island – the Northern limit of Laptev Sea. (Note: Defined by IHO as "A line joining Cape Molotov to the Northern extremity of Kotelni Island (76° 10′ N, 138° 50′ E).")

From the Northern extremity of Kotelni Island to the Northern point of Wrangel Island – the Northern limit of East Siberian Sea. (Note: Defined by IHO as "A line from the Northernmost point of Wrangel Island (179° 30' W) to the Northern sides of the De Long Islands (including Henrietta and Jeannette Islands) and Bennett Island, thence to the Northern extremity of Kotelni Island.")

From the Northern point of Wrangel Island to Point Barrow – the Northern limit of Chuckchi Sea [sic]. (Note: Defined by IHO as "A line from Point Barrow, Alaska (71° 20′ N, 156° 20′ W) to the Northernmost point of Wrangel Island (179° 30' W).")

From Point Barrow to Cape Land's End on Prince Patrick Island – the Northern limit of Beaufort Sea, (Note: Defined by IHO as "A line from Point Barrow, Alaska, to Lands End, Prince Patrick Island (76° 16′ N, 124° 08′ W).") through the Northwest coast of Prince Patrick Island to Cape Leopold M'Clintock, thence to Cape Murray (Brook Island [sic]) and along the Northwest coast to the extreme Northerly point; to Cape Mackay (Borden Island); through the Northwesterly coast of Borden Island to Cape Malloch, to Cape Isachsen (Ellef Ringnes Island); to the Northwest point of Meighen Island to Cape Stallworthy (Axel Heiberg Island) to Cape Colgate the extreme West point of Ellesmere Island; through the North shore of Ellesmere Island to Cape Columbia thence a line to Cape Morris Jesup (Greenland).

Note that these definitions exclude any marginal waterbodies that are separately defined by the IHO (such as the Kara Sea and East Siberian Sea), though these are usually considered to be part of the Arctic Ocean.

The CIA defines the limits of the Arctic Ocean differently, as depicted in the map comparing its definition to the IHO's definition.

== Atlantic Ocean ==
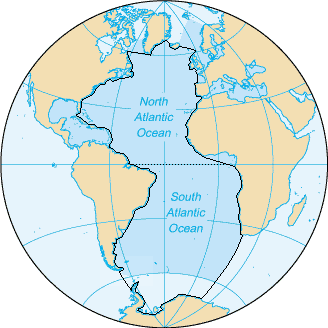
The Atlantic Ocean, according to the CIA World Factbook (blue area), and as defined by the IHO (black outline – excluding marginal waterbodies)

The Atlantic Ocean separates the Americas from Europe and Africa. It may be further subdivided by the Equator into northern and southern portions.

=== North Atlantic Ocean ===
The 3rd edition, currently in force, of the International Hydrographic Organization's (IHO) Limits of Oceans and Seas defines the limits of the North Atlantic Ocean (excluding the seas it contains) as follows:

On the West. The Eastern limits of the Caribbean Sea, (Note: Defined by IHO as "From Point San Diego (Puerto Rico) Northward along the meridian thereof (65°39'W) to the 100 fathom line, thence Eastward and Southward, in such a manner that all islands, shoals and narrow waters of the Lesser Antilles are included in the Caribbean Sea as far as Galera Point (Northeast extremity of the island of Trinidad). From Galera Point through Trinidad to Galeota Point (Southeast extreme) and thence to Baja Point (9°32′N 61°0′W) in Venezuela".) the Southeastern limits of the Gulf of Mexico (Note: Defined by IHO as "A line joining Cape Catoche Light (21°37′N 87°04′W) with the Light on Cape San Antonio in Cuba, through this island to the meridian of 83°W and to the Northward along this meridian to the latitude of the South point of the Dry Tortugas (24°35'N), along this parallel Eastward to Rebecca Shoal (82°35'W) thence through the shoals and Florida Keys to the mainland at eastern end of Florida Bay, all the narrow waters between the Dry Tortugas and the mainland being considered to be within the Gulf".) from the North coast of Cuba to Key West, the Southwestern limit of the Bay of Fundy (Note: Defined by IHO as "A line running northwesterly from Cape St. Mary (44°05'N) Nova Scotia, through Machias Seal Island (67°06'W) and on to Little River Head (44°39'N) in the State of Maine".) and the Southeastern and Northeastern limits of the Gulf of St. Lawrence. (Note: Defined by IHO as "A line from Cape Canso (45°20′N 61°0′W) to Red Point (45°35′N 60°45′W) in Cape Breton Island, through this Island to Cape Breton and on to Pointe Blanche (46°45′N 56°11′W) in the Island of St. Pierre, and thence to the Southwest point of Morgan Island (46°51′N 55°49′W)" and "A line running from Cape Bauld (North point of Kirpon Island, 51°40′N 55°25′W) to the East extreme of Belle Isle and on to the Northeast Ledge (52°02′N 55°15′W). Thence a line joining this ledge with the East extreme of Cape St. Charles (52°13'N) in Labrador".)

On the North. The Southern limit of Davis Strait (Note: Defined by IHO as "The parallel of 60° North between Greenland and Labrador".) from the coast of Labrador to Greenland and the Southwestern limit of the Greenland Sea (Note: Defined by IHO as "A line joining Straumness (NW extreme of Iceland) to Cape Nansen (68°15′N 29°30′W) in Greenland".) and Norwegian Sea (Note: Defined by IHO as "From a point on the West coast of Norway in Latitude 61°00' North along this parallel to Longitude 0°53' West thence a line to the NE extreme of Fuglö (62°21′N 6°15′W) and on to the East extreme of Gerpir (65°05′N 13°30′W) in Iceland".) from Greenland to the Shetland Islands.

On the East. The Northwestern limit of the North Sea, (Note: Defined by IHO as "From Dunnet Head (3°22'W) in Scotland to Tor Ness (58°47'N) in the Island of Hoy, thence through this island to the Kame of Hoy (58°55'N) on to Breck Ness on Mainland (58°58'N) through this island to Costa Head (3°14'W) and to Inga Ness (59'17'N) in Westray through Westray, to Bow Head, across to Mull Head (North point of Papa Westray) and on to Seal Skerry (North point of North Ronaldsay) and thence to Horse Island (South point of the Shetland Islands)".) the Northern and Western limits of the Scottish Seas, (Note: Defined by IHO as "A line running from Bloody Foreland (55°10′N 8°17′W) in Ireland to the West point of Tory Island, on to Barra Head, the Southwest point of the Hebrides, thence through these islands, in such a manner that the West coasts of the main islands appertain to the Atlantic Ocean and all the narrow waters appertain to the Inner Seas, as far as the Butt of Lewis (North Point), and thence to Cape Wrath (58°37'N) in Scotland".) the Southern limit of the Irish Sea, (Note: Defined by IHO as "A line joining St. David's Head (51°54′N 5°19′W) to Carnsore Point (52°10′N 6°22′W)".) the Western limits of the Bristol (Note: Defined by IHO as "a line joining Hartland Point [in Devon] (51°01′N 4°32′W) to St. Govan's Head [in Pembrokeshire] (51°36′N 4°55′W)".) and English Channels, (Note: Defined by IHO as "A line joining Isle Vierge (48°38′23″N 4°34′13″W) to Lands End (50°04′N 5°43′W)".) of the Bay of Biscay (Note: Defined by IHO as "A line joining Cap Ortegal (43°46′N 7°52′W) to Penmarch Point (47°48′N 4°22′W)".) and of the Mediterranean Sea. (Note: Defined by IHO as "A line joining the extremities of Cape Trafalgar (Spain) and Cape Spartel (Africa)".)

On the South. The equator, from the coast of Brazil to the Southwestern limit of the Gulf of Guinea. (Note: Defined by IHO as "A line running Southeastward from Cape Palmas in Liberia to Cape Lopez (0°38′S 8°42′E)".)

Note that this definition excludes any marginal waterbodies that are separately defined by the IHO (such as the Caribbean Sea and North Sea), though these are usually considered to be part of the Atlantic Ocean.

=== South Atlantic Ocean ===
The 3rd edition (currently in force) of the International Hydrographic Organization's (IHO) Limits of Oceans and Seas defines the limits of the South Atlantic Ocean (excluding the seas it contains) as follows:

On the Southwest. The meridian of Cape Horn, Chile (67°16'W) from Tierra del Fuego to the Antarctic Continent; a line from Cape Virgins (52°21′S 68°21′W) to Cape Espiritu Santo, Tierra del Fuego, the Eastern entrance to Magellan Strait.

On the West. The limit of the Rio de La Plata. (Note: Defined by IHO as "A line joining Punta del Este, Uruguay (34°58.5′S 54°57.5′W) and Cabo San Antonio, Argentina (36°18′S 56°46′W)".)

On the North. The Southern limit of the North Atlantic Ocean.

On the Northeast. The limit of the Gulf of Guinea.

On the Southeast. From Cape Agulhas along the meridian of 20° East to the Antarctic continent.

On the South. The Antarctic Continent.

Note that these definitions exclude any marginal waterbodies that are separately defined by the IHO (such as the Bay of Biscay and Gulf of Guinea), though these are usually considered to be part of the Atlantic Ocean.

In its 2002 draft, the IHO redefined the Atlantic Ocean, moving its southern limit to 60°S, with the waters south of that line identified as the Southern Ocean. This new definition has not yet been ratified (and, in addition, a reservation was lodged in 2003 by Australia.) While the name "Southern Ocean" is frequently used, some geographic authorities such as the 10th edition of the World Atlas from the U.S. National Geographic Society generally show the Atlantic, Indian, and Pacific Oceans continuing to Antarctica. If and when adopted, the 2002 definition would be published in the 4th edition of Limits of Oceans and Seas, re-instituting the 2nd edition's "Southern Ocean", omitted from the 3rd edition.

== Indian Ocean ==
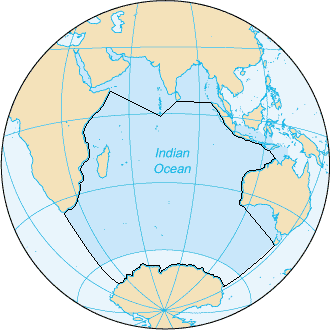
The Indian Ocean, according to the CIA World Factbook (blue area), and as defined by the IHO (black outline – excluding marginal waterbodies)

The Indian Ocean washes upon southern Asia and separates Africa and Australia.

The 3rd edition, currently in force, of the International Hydrographic Organization's (IHO) Limits of Oceans and Seas defines the limits of the Indian Ocean (excluding the seas it contains) as follows:

On the North. The Southern limits of the Arabian Sea (Note: Defined by IHO as "A line running from the South extremity of Addu Atoll (Maldives), to the Eastern extreme of Ràs Hafun (Africa, 10°26'N)".) and the Lakshadweep Sea, (Note: Defined by IHO as "A line running from Dondra Head in Ceylon [Sri Lanka] to the most Southerly point of Addu Atoll".) the Southern limit of the Bay of Bengal, (Note: Defined by IHO as "Adam's Bridge (between India and Ceylon and from the Southern extreme of Dondra Head (South point of Ceylon) to the North point of Poeloe Bras (5°44′N 95°04′E)".) the Southern limits of the East Indian Archipelago, (Note: Defined by IHO as the southern limits of the Java Sea ("the North and West coasts of Java to Java Hoofd (6°46′S 105°12′E) its Western point, and thence a line to Vlakke Hoek (5°55′S 104°35′E) the Southern extreme of Sumatra"), the Bali Sea ("A line from Tanjong Bantenan through the Southern points of Balt [sic] and Noesa Islands to Tanjong Bt Gendang, the Southwest extreme of Lombok, and its South coast to Tanjong Ringgit the Southeast extreme, thence a line to Tanjong Mangkoen (9°01′S 116°43′E) the Southwest extreme of Soembawa"), the Savu Sea ("By a line from the Southwest point of Timor to the Northeast point of Roti, through this island to its Southwest point, thence a line to Poeloe Dana (10°49′S 121°17′E) and to Tanjong Ngoendjoe, the Southern extreme of Soemba and through this island to Tanjong Karosso, its Western point"), and the western limit of the Timor Sea ("A line from Cape Londonderry to the Southwest point of Roti Island (10°56′S 122°48′E)".) and the Southern limit of the Great Australian Bight. (Note: Defined by IHO as "A line joining West Cape Howe (35°08′S 117°37′E) Australia to South West Cape, Tasmania".)

On the West. From Cape Agulhas in 20° long. East, Southward along this meridian to the Antarctic Continent.

On the East. From South East Cape, the Southern point of Tasmania down the meridian 146°55'E to the Antarctic Continent.

On the South. The Antarctic Continent.

Note that this definition excludes any marginal waterbodies that are separately defined by the IHO (such as the Bay of Bengal and Arabian Sea), though these are usually considered to be part of the Indian Ocean.

In its 2002 draft, the IHO redefined the Indian Ocean, moving its southern limit to 60°S, with the waters south of that line identified as the Southern Ocean. This new definition has not yet been ratified (and, in addition, a reservation was lodged in 2003 by Australia.) While the name "Southern Ocean" is frequently used, some geographic authorities such as the 10th edition of the World Atlas from the U.S. National Geographic Society generally show the Atlantic, Indian, and Pacific Oceans continuing to Antarctica. If and when adopted, the 2002 definition would be published in the 4th edition of Limits of Oceans and Seas, re-instituting the 2nd edition's "Southern Ocean", omitted from the 3rd edition.

The boundary of the Indian Ocean is a constitutional issue for Australia. The Imperial South Australia Colonisation Act, 1834, which established and defined the Colony of South Australia defined South Australia's southern limit as being the "Southern Ocean". This definition was carried through to Australian constitutional law upon the Federation of Australia in 1901.

== Pacific Ocean ==
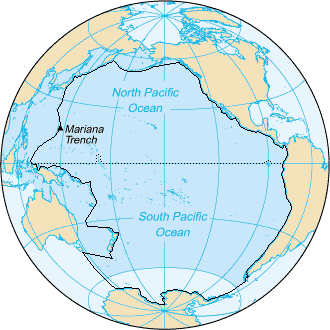
The Pacific Ocean according to the CIA World Factbook (blue area), and as defined by the IHO (black outline – excluding marginal waterbodies)

The Pacific is the ocean that separates Asia and Australia from the Americas. It may be further subdivided by the Equator into northern and southern portions.

=== North Pacific Ocean ===
The 3rd edition, currently in force, of the International Hydrographic Organization's (IHO) Limits of Oceans and Seas defines the limits of the North Pacific Ocean (excluding the seas it contains) as follows:

On the Southwest. The Northeastern limit of the East Indian Archipelago from the Equator to Luzon Island.

On the West and Northwest. The Eastern limits of the Philippine Sea (Note: Defined by IHO as "By the ridge joining Japan to the Bonin, Volcano and Ladrone (Mariana) Islands, all these being included in the Philippine Sea".) and Japan Sea (Note: Defined by IHO as "In the Tsugaru Kaikô. From the extremity of Siriya Saki (141°28'E) to the extremity of Esan Saki (41°48'N)".) and the Southeastern limit of the Sea of Okhotsk. (Note: Defined by IHO as "A line running from Nosyappu Saki (Cape Noshap, 43°23'N) in the Island of Hokusyû (Yezo) through the Kuril or Tisima Islands to Cape Lopatka (South point of Kamchatka) in such a way that all the narrow waters between Hokusyû and Kamchatka are included in the Sea of Okhotsk".)

On the North. The Southern limits of the Bering Sea (Note: Defined by IHO as "A line running from Kabuch Point (54°48′N 163°21′W) in the Alaskan Peninsula, through the Aleutian Islands to the South extremes of the Komandorski Islands and on to Cape Kamchatka in such a way that all the narrow waters between Alaska and Kamchatka are included in the Bering Sea".) and the Gulf of Alaska. (Note: Defined by IHO as "A line drawn from Cape Spencer, the Northern limit of [the Coastal Waters of Southeast Alaska and British Columbia] to Kabuch Point, the Southeast limit of [the Bering Sea], in such a way that all the adjacent islands are included in the Gulf of Alaska".)

On the East. The Western limit of Coastal waters of Southeast Alaska and Br. Columbia, (Note: Defined by IHO as "A line running westerly from Black Rock Point (50°44',5N) in Vancouver Island through the Scott Islands in such a way that all the narrow waters between these islands are included in the Coastal Waters, thence to Cape St. James (Southern extremity of Queen Charlotte Islands), through this group in the same way, then from Cape Knox (54°10′N 133°06′W) Northward to the Western extreme of Langara Island and on to Point Cornwallis (132°52'W) in the Prince of Wales group, thence along the Western shores of this group, of Baranof, Kruzof, Chicagof, and Yakobi Islands, so that all the narrow waters between them are included in the coastal waters, and, finally, from Cape Bingham (58°04'N) in Yakobi Island to Cape Spencer (58°12′N 136°39′W)".) and the Southern limit of the Gulf of California. (Note: Defined by IHO as "A line joining Piastla Point (23°38'N) in Mexico, and the Southern extreme of Lower California".)

On the South. The Equator, but excluding those islands of the Gilbert and Galàpagos [sic] Groups which lie to the Northward thereof.

=== South Pacific Ocean ===
The 3rd edition, currently in force, of the International Hydrographic Organization's (IHO) Limits of Oceans and Seas defines the limits of the South Pacific Ocean (excluding the seas it contains) as follows:

On the West. From Southeast Cape, the Southern point of Tasmania, down the meridian of 146°55'E to the Antarctic continent.

On the Southwest and Northwest. The Southern, Eastern and Northeastern limits of the Tasman Sea, (Note: Southern limit defined by IHO as "A line joining the Southern point of Auckland Island (50°55′S 166°0′E) to South East Cape, the Southern point of Tasmania") (Note: Southeastern limit defined by IHO as "A line running from South West Cape, Stewart Island, through The Snares (48°0′S 166°30′E) to North West Cape, Auckland Island (50°30′S 166°10′E), through this island to its Southern point.") (Note: Eastern limit defined by IHO as "In Cook Strait. A line joining the South extreme of the foul ground off Cape Palliser (Ngawi) and the Lighthouse on Cape Campbell (Te Karaka)" and "In Foveaux Strait (46°45'S). A line joining the Light on Waipapapa Point [sic] (168°33'E) with East Head (47'02'S) of Stewart Island (Rakiura).") (Note: Northeastern limit defined by IHO as "From the South East Rock to the North point of Three Kings Islands (34°10′S 172°10′E) thence to North Cape in New Zealand".) (Note: Portion of the northern limit defined by IHO as "The parallel of 30° S ... [where it intersects] a line joining the East extremities of Elizabeth Reef and South East Rock (31°47′S 159°18′E) then to the Southward along this line to the South East Rock.") the Southeastern and Northeastern limits of the Coral Sea, (Note: Southeastern limit defined by IHO as "A line from the Southeastern extreme of Aneityum Island to Southeast (Nokanhui) Islets (22°46′S 167°34′E) off the Southeast extreme of New Caledonia, thence through the East point of Middleton Reef to the Eastern extreme of Elizabeth Reef (29°55′S 159°02′E) and down this meridian to Latitude 30° South".) (Note: Northeastern limit defined by IHO as "From the Northernmost island of the Duff or Wilson Group through these islands to their Southeastern extreme, thence a line to Mera Lava, New Hebrides Islands [Vanuatu] (14°25′S 163°03′E) and down the Eastern coasts of the islands of this Group to Aneityum Island (20°11′S 169°51′E) in such a way that all the islands of these Groups, and the straits separating them, are included in the Coral Sea".) (Note: Portion of the northern limit defined by IHO as "...Cape Surville, the Eastern extreme of San Cristobal Island, Solomons; thence through Nupani, the Northwestern of the Santa Cruz Islands (10°04′S 165°40.5′E) to the Northernmost Island of the Duff or Wilson Group (9°48.5′S 167°06′E).") the Southern, Eastern and Northern limits of the Solomon (Note: Northeastern limit defined by IHO as "By a line from the Southern point of New Ireland to the North point of Buka Island, through this island to the Northwest point of Bougainville Island, along the Southern coasts of Bougainville, Choisel, Ysabel, Malaita and San Cristobal Islands".) and Bismark [sic] (Note: North and Eastern limit defined by IHO as "By the Northern and Northeastern coasts of the islands of New Ireland, New Hanover, the Admiralty Islands, Hermit Island, and the Ninigo Group, through Manu and Aua Islands to Wuvulu Island and thence a line to Baudissin Point in New Guinea (142°02'E)".) seas, and the Northeastern limit of the East Indian Archipelago from New Guinea to the Equator. (Note: Relevant portion defined by IHO as "... through ... Kawé [Island] to the Western extremes of Waigeo and Batanta Islands across to the Northwest point of Samawati Island [sic], down the coast to Tg. Menonket its Southwest point, and thence to Tg. Sele, New Guinea (1°26′S 130°56′E).")

On the North. The Equator, but including those islands of the Gilbert and Galàpagos [sic] Groups which lie to the Northward thereof.

On the East. The meridian of Cape Horn (67°16'W) from Tierra del Fuego to the Antarctic continent; a line from Cape Virgins (52°21′S 68°21′W) to Cape Espiritu Santo, Tierra del Fuego, the Eastern entrance to Magellan Strait. (These limits have not yet been officially accepted by Argentina and Chile.)

On the South. The Antarctic continent.

Note that these definitions exclude any marginal waterbodies that are separately defined by the IHO (such as the Gulf of Alaska and Coral Sea), though these are usually considered to be part of the Pacific Ocean.

In its 2002 draft, the IHO redefined the Pacific Ocean, moving its southern limit to 60°S, with the waters south of that line identified as the Southern Ocean. This new definition has not yet been ratified (and, in addition, a reservation was lodged in 2003 by Australia.) While the name "Southern Ocean" is frequently used, some geographic authorities such as the 10th edition of the World Atlas from the U.S. National Geographic Society generally show the Atlantic, Indian, and Pacific Oceans continuing to Antarctica. If and when adopted, the 2002 definition would be published in the 4th edition of Limits of Oceans and Seas, re-instituting the 2nd edition's "Southern Ocean", omitted from the 3rd edition.

== Southern or Antarctic Ocean ==
The Southern Ocean according to the CIA World Factbook

The Southern Ocean contains the waters that surround Antarctica and sometimes is considered an extension of Pacific, Atlantic and Indian Oceans.

In 1928, the first edition of the International Hydrographic Organization's (IHO) Limits of Oceans and Seas publication included the Southern Ocean around Antarctica. The Southern Ocean was delineated by land-based limits – the continent of Antarctica to the south, and the continents of South America, Africa, and Australia plus Broughton Island, New Zealand in the north. The detailed land-limits used were Cape Horn in South America, Cape Agulhas in Africa, the southern coast of Australia from Cape Leeuwin, Western Australia, to South East Cape, Tasmania, via the western edge of the water body of Bass Strait, and then Broughton Island before returning to Cape Horn.

The northern limits of the Southern Ocean were moved southwards in the IHO's 1937 second edition of the Limits of Oceans and Seas. The Southern Ocean then extended from Antarctica northwards to latitude 40° south between Cape Agulhas in Africa (long. 20° east) and Cape Leeuwin in Western Australia (long. 115° east), and extended to latitude 55° south between Auckland Island of New Zealand (long. 165° or 166° east) and Cape Horn in South America (long. 67° west).

The Southern Ocean did not appear in the 1953 third edition because "...the northern limits ... are difficult to lay down owing to their seasonal change ... Hydrographic Offices who issue separate publications dealing with this area are therefore left to decide their own northern limits. (Great Britain uses the Latitude of 55° South)". Instead, in the IHO 1953 publication, the Atlantic, Indian and Pacific Oceans were extended southward, the Indian and Pacific Oceans (which had not previously touched pre 1953, as per the first and second editions) now abutted at the meridian of South East Cape, and the southern limits of the Great Australian Bight and the Tasman Sea were moved northwards.

The IHO readdressed the question of the Southern Ocean in a survey in 2000. Of its 68 member nations, 28 responded, and all responding members except Argentina agreed to redefine the ocean, reflecting the importance placed by oceanographers on ocean currents. The proposal for the name Southern Ocean won 18 votes, beating the alternative Antarctic Ocean. Half of the votes supported a definition of the ocean's northern limit at 60°S (with no land interruptions at this latitude), with the other 14 votes cast for other definitions, mostly 50°S, but a few for as far north as 35°S.

The 4th edition of Limits of Oceans and Seas has yet to be published due to "areas of concern" by several countries relating to various naming issues around the world. The IHB circulated a new draft of the 4th edition of the publication in August 2002, however there were still various changes, 60 seas were added or renamed from the 3rd edition, and even the name of the publication was changed. A reservation had also been lodged by Australia regarding the Southern Ocean limits. Effectively, the 3rd edition (which did not delineate the Southern Ocean leaving delineation to local hydrographic offices) has yet to be superseded and IHO documents declare that it remains "currently in force."

Despite this, the 4th edition definition has de facto usage by many organisations, scientists and nations – even at times by IHO committees. Some nations' hydrographic offices have defined their own boundaries; the United Kingdom used the 55°S parallel for example.

Other sources, such as the National Geographic Society, show the Atlantic, Pacific and Indian Oceans as extending to Antarctica, although articles on the National Geographic web site have begun to reference the Southern Ocean.

In Australia, cartographic authorities defined the Southern Ocean as including the entire body of water between Antarctica and the south coasts of Australia and New Zealand. This delineation is basically the same as the original (first) edition of the IHO publication and effectively the same as the second edition. In the second edition, the Great Australian Bight was defined as the only geographical entity between the Australian coast and the Southern Ocean. Coastal maps of Tasmania and South Australia label the sea areas as Southern Ocean, while Cape Leeuwin in Western Australia is described as the point where the Indian and Southern Oceans meet.

== Theories of natural delimitation between the Atlantic and Pacific oceans ==
Map showing the proposal presented by the thesis entitled "Natural delimitation between the Pacific and South Atlantic oceans by the Shackleton fracture zone".

Scientific researchers have proposed delimiting the boundary between the Atlantic and Pacific oceans by two different natural boundaries, by the Shackleton fracture zone and by the Scotia Arc the former being more current than the latter.

== See also ==
- International Maritime Organization – Specialized agency of the United Nations
- List of ancient oceans – List of Earth's former oceans
- List of seas
- Marginal sea – A sea partially enclosed by islands, archipelagos, or peninsulas
- Oceanography – Scientific study of the ocean
- Polar seas – Collective term for the Arctic Ocean and the southern part of the Southern Ocean
- Sea – Large body of salt water
- Seven Seas – Ancient phrase for all of the world's known seas
- World Ocean Atlas – Dataset of ocean properties
- Boundaries between the continents – Geographical convention
