= Charles Badger Hall =

US Army major general (1834–1914)

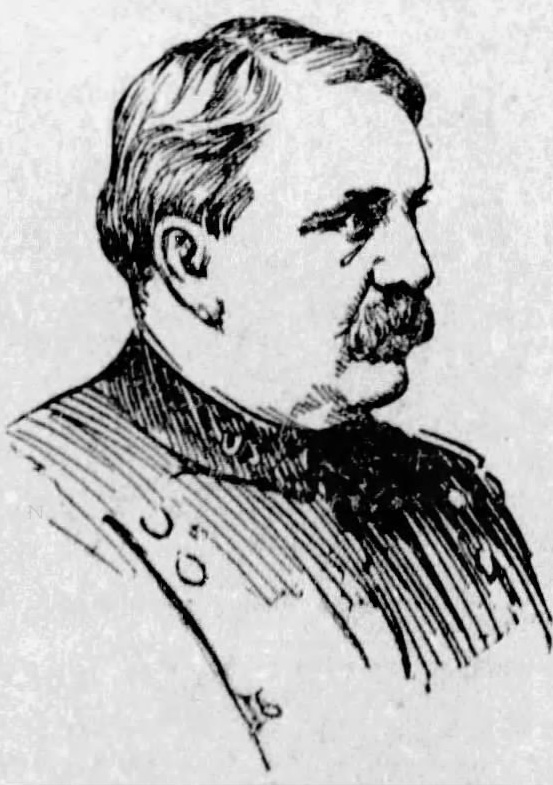
- The Kansas City Star (Kansas City, Missouri), 27 March 1908
- Born: 29 September 1844; Portland, Maine, US
- Died: 11 May 1914 (aged 70); Washington, D.C., US
- Burial place: Evergreen Cemetery, Portland, Maine, US
- Spouse: Lucretia French Plummer (m. 1868; death 1902)
- Children: 3
- Military career
- Allegiance: Union (American Civil War); United States
- Service: Union Army; United States Army
- Service years: 1862–1865 (Union Army); 1867–1908 (US Army)
- Rank: Major General
- Unit: US Army Infantry Branch
- Commands: Castle Williams; General Recruiting Service Sub Depot Saint Paul; Company H, 19th Infantry Regiment; 30th Infantry Regiment; Island of Mindoro; Post of Manila; Malate Barracks; Post of Santa Mesa; 18th Infantry Regiment; United States Army Command and General Staff College
- Wars: American Civil War; American Indian Wars; Spanish–American War; Philippine–American War

Charles Badger Hall (29 September 1844 – 11 May 1914) was a career officer in the United States Army. A Union Army veteran of the American Civil War, his military service spanned 1862 to 1908, and he attained the rank of major general. He served in the American Indian Wars, Spanish–American War, and Philippine–American War and carried out several command assignments in the Philippines during the later years of his career. His career culminated with his 1906 assignment as commandant of the Army School of the Line (now the United States Army Command and General Staff College), and he served in this post until retiring in 1908.

Hall was a native of Portland, Maine, and he was raised and educated in Portland. He attended Portland High School, where he participated in the corps of cadets program and advanced through the ranks to command one of the corps' companies. After his 1862 graduation, Hall enlisted for the American Civil War and was commissioned as a second lieutenant in Company A, 25th Maine Infantry Regiment. He served for the regiment's entire nine months of mobilization, during which it took part in the Defenses of Washington. Many of the regiment's members, including Hall, then joined the 30th Maine Infantry Regiment, which took part in the Red River campaign before moving to Virginia, where it participated in the Valley campaigns. At the end of the war, he performed Reconstruction era duty in South Carolina before being mustered out in September 1865.

After working as a clerk in Portland's United States Custom House, in 1867 he was commissioned in the 28th Infantry Regiment. He advanced through the ranks in command and staff assignments during the decades after the Civil War, primarily on American Indian Wars frontier duty in the western United States. During the Spanish–American War of 1898, he served in Puerto Rico. In 1899, he was posted to the Philippines for Philippine–American War duty. He was promoted to lieutenant colonel in October 1901 and colonel in August 1903. In addition to commanding the 30th Infantry Regiment, he commanded several posts in the Philippines, and he later commanded the 18th Infantry Regiment.

Hall was assigned as commandant of the Army School of the Line in August 1906. He was promoted to brigadier general in April 1907, and major general in March 1908. He retired at his own request in April 1908, a few months before he would have reached the mandatory retirement age of 64. In retirement, Hall resided in Washington, D.C. He died in Washington on 11 May 1914. Hall was buried at Evergreen Cemetery in Portland, Maine.

== Early life ==
Charles Badger Hall was born in Portland, Maine on 29 September 1844, a son of Charles H. Hall and Caroline (Page) Hall. He was raised and educated in Portland, and was an 1862 graduate of Portland High School. During his high school years, the faculty included Thomas Brackett Reed, whom Hall and other students credited with teaching them many practical lessons in addition to their courses in French, Greek, Latin, and English. Portland High School maintained a corps of cadets program that offered participants instruction in military subjects including drill and ceremony. Hall advanced through several leadership positions to attain the rank of captain as commander of a company in the corps' 2nd Battalion.

After graduating from high school, in July 1862 Hall enlisted in the Union Army for the American Civil War. Initially a private in the 25th Maine Infantry Regiment, he was promoted to first sergeant in August. In September, he received his commission as a second lieutenant of United States Volunteers in the regiment's Company A. He served with the 25th Maine during its entire existence, primarily in the Defenses of Washington. Hall was promoted to first lieutenant of Volunteers in March 1863 and was with the regiment when it was mustered out in July 1863.

== Continued career ==
Most former members of the 25th Maine, including Hall, enlisted in the new 30th Maine Infantry Regiment. Assigned to duty in Louisiana, the 30th Maine took part in the Red River campaign, including the Battle of Mansfield and Battle of Pleasant Hill. At the Battle of Pleasant Hill, Francis Fessenden, the commander of the 30th Maine, was in command of a brigade and Hall was assigned as his aide-de camp. When Fessenden was wounded, there was no time to send a courier to notify Fessenden's second-in-command, so Hall commanded the brigade until the end of the fighting. He received brevet promotion to first lieutenant of the regular army to recognize his heroism at Mansfield and brevet captain in the regular army in recognition of his heroism at Pleasant Hill.

After military operations in Louisiana concluded, the 30th Maine moved to Virginia, where it took part in the Valley campaigns of 1864. Engagements in which he participated included the Battle of Cedar Creek; he was serving on the staff of brigade commander James Deering Fessenden, who was with Philip Sheridan, the overall Union commander. When Sheridan observed stragglers retreating in their direction, he went forward in a successful effort to rally his troops and turn the tide of the battle. This event, now known as Sheridan's Ride, included both Fessenden and Hall, who decided to remain with Sheridan while he was on the move. Following the April 1865 Assassination of Abraham Lincoln, Fessenden's command was ordered to security duties in and around Washington, D.C. Afterward, Fessenden was assigned to command the Western District of South Carolina, and Hall was assigned as his assistant adjutant. Hall was discharged in September 1865 and returned to Portland, where he worked as a clerk at the United States Custom House.

In January 1867, Hall was offered a commission as a second lieutenant in the regular army's 28th Infantry Regiment; he had not applied for the position, but had been recommended by Francis and James Fessenden. Hall accepted, and reported to the recruiting and transient troops detachment on Governors Island. After completing the qualifying examination for his commission, he was assigned to command the garrison at the island's Castle Williams. Hall subsequently joined his new regiment for Reconstruction duty at Little Rock Barracks, Arkansas. He was promoted to first lieutenant in December 1868.

=== Family ===
In May 1868, Hall married Lucretia French Plummer. They were married until her death in 1902. The Halls were the parents of two daughters who lived to adulthood, Marion Clark Hall and Gertrude Plummer Hall, and Annie Conley Hall, who died young.

== Later career ==
In December 1870, Hall was transferred to the 19th Infantry Regiment and assigned as regimental quartermaster. He continued to serve with the 19th Infantry until 1899, and carried out duties including regimental adjutant and commander of Company H. Hall was promoted to captain in March 1888. Among the posts at which he served during the American Indian Wars was: Fort Larned, Kansas; Fort Leavenworth, Kansas; Fort Brown, Texas; Fort Clark, Texas; and Fort Sam Houston, Texas. He was promoted to captain in March 1888. In October 1888, Hall was assigned to detached duty as commander of the General Recruiting Service Sub Depot in Saint Paul, Minnesota. In June 1892, he was assigned to duty as instructor and inspector for the Maine National Guard. In September 1892, he was assigned the additional duty as aide-de-camp to Governor Edwin C. Burleigh during Burleigh's review of the militia at its annual summer training period. In December 1892, he rejoined the 19th Infantry at Fort Wayne, Michigan. In the summer of 1894, Hall again served as inspector and instructor for the Maine National Guard.

In 1895, Hall was selected for duty assisting Major General Thomas H. Ruger, commander of the Department of the East, to re-write the army's Infantry Drill Regulations, the service's main manual of arms. At the start of the Spanish–American War in 1898, Hall was serving with the 19th infantry at Fort Brady, Michigan. The unit traveled to Mobile, Alabama for organization, training, and overseas transport; major combat had ended by the time the unit was ready to move, and it performed post-conflict occupation duty in Puerto Rico. Hall served as treasurer of the United States Military Academy from 1899 to 1902; in March 1899, he was promoted to major in the 2nd Infantry Regiment.

In January 1902, Hall was promoted to lieutenant colonel and assigned to the 30th Infantry Regiment. Ordered to the Philippines during the Philippine–American War, he commanded the 30th Infantry as well as several islands and posts, including the: 30th Infantry Regiment; Island of Mindoro; Post of Manila; Malate Barracks; and the Post of Santa Mesa. In August 1903, Hall was promoted to colonel as commander of the 18th Infantry Regiment. After returning to the United States in January 1905, he commanded the 18th Infantry at the Presidio of San Francisco. In August 1906, he was assigned as commandant of the Army School of the Line, now the United States Army Command and General Staff College. He was promoted to brigadier general in April 1907. In March 1908, he was promoted to major general. Hall then requested retirement, which he was approved, and he left the service on 28 April, a few months before he would have reached the mandatory retirement age of 64.

In retirement, Hall resided in Washington, D.C and was active in the Military Order of the Loyal Legion of the United States, Military Order of Foreign Wars, and Military Order of the Carabao. He died in Washington on 11 May 1914. Hall was buried at Evergreen Cemetery in Portland, Maine.

== Works by ==
- United States Patent Office (5 October 1897). "Patent 590,979: Miter-Box". Specifications of Patents, Part I. Washington, DC: US Government Printing Office. pp. 49–50 – via Google Books.
- "Address to the Student Officers of the Service Schools and Staff College, September 3, 1906". Journal of the United States Infantry Association. Washington, DC: United States Infantry Association. January 1907. pp. 56–60 – via Google Books.
- "Notes on the Red River Campaign of 1864". War Papers, Read Before the Commandery of the State of Maine, Military Order of the Loyal Legion of the United States. Vol. IV. Portland, Maine: Lefavor-Tower Company. 1915. pp. 264–281 – via Google Books.
