= Eetookashoo Bay =

Bay in Nunavut, Canada

- Location within Nunavut
- Location: Axel Heiberg Island
- Coordinates: 81°20′55″N 93°30′20″W
- Ocean/sea sources: Arctic Ocean
- Basin countries: Canada
- Settlements: Uninhabited

Eetookashoo Bay is a waterway in the Qikiqtaaluk Region, Nunavut, Canada. It is located at the northern end of Axel Heiberg Island between Cape Thomas Hubbard and Cape Stallworthy. The bay is named in honour of Eetookashoo (Itukassuk), one of the Inuit who had traveled with Frederick Cook and Donald Baxter MacMillan.
