= Pitsiulartok =

Island in Nunavut, Canada

Pitsiulartok (Formerly "Fairway Island")
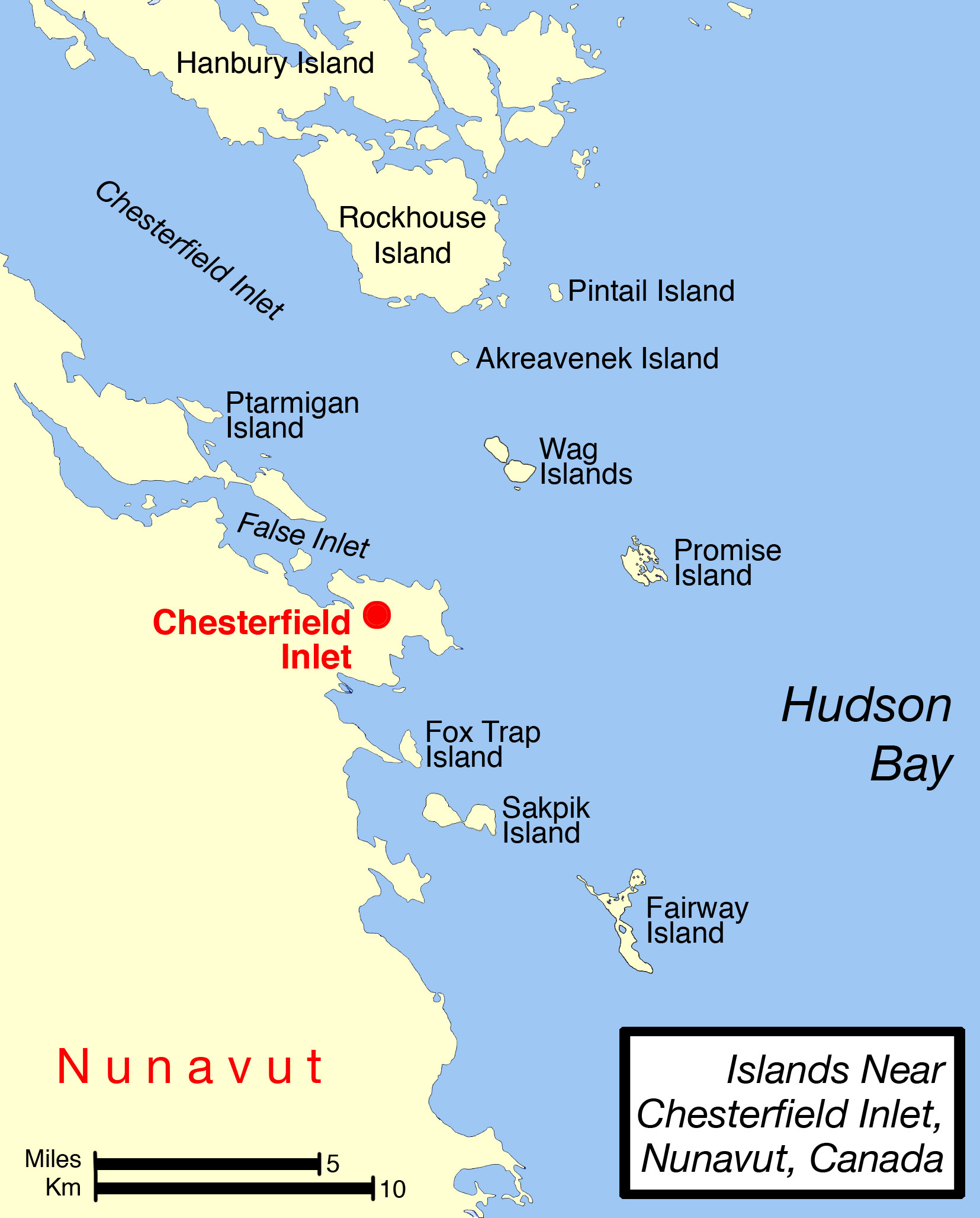

- Location within Nunavut Location within Canada

Geography
- Location: Hudson Bay
- Coordinates: 63°15′N 090°33′W

Administration
- Canada
- Nunavut: Nunavut
- Region: Kivalliq

Demographics
- Population: Uninhabited

Pitsiulartok or Pituilaktok (formerly Fairway Island) is a small, uninhabited island located at 63°15'N, 90°33'W in Hudson Bay, about 13 km from the community of Chesterfield Inlet, Nunavut, Canada. The narrow island is about 3.5 km in length and barely 1 km wide at its widest point. Traditionally it was a walrus-hunting ground for the local Inuit, and a landmark for southern whalers. It is part of a loose chain of small islands running along the coast, including Sakpik Island and Promise Island.

The name "Pituilaktok" comes from the Inuktitut name for a local bird known in English as the black guillemot (cepphus grylle), "pitiula".

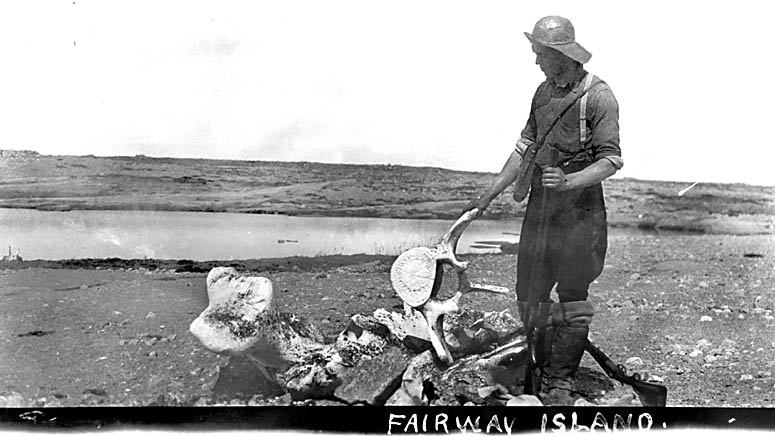
Fairway Island, early 1920s. Subject unidentified. Photo by Hudson's Bay Company employee Capt. George Cleveland of the motor schooner Fort Chesterfield.
