= Promise Island =

Island in Nunavut, Canada

Promise Island (Nannuyuma)
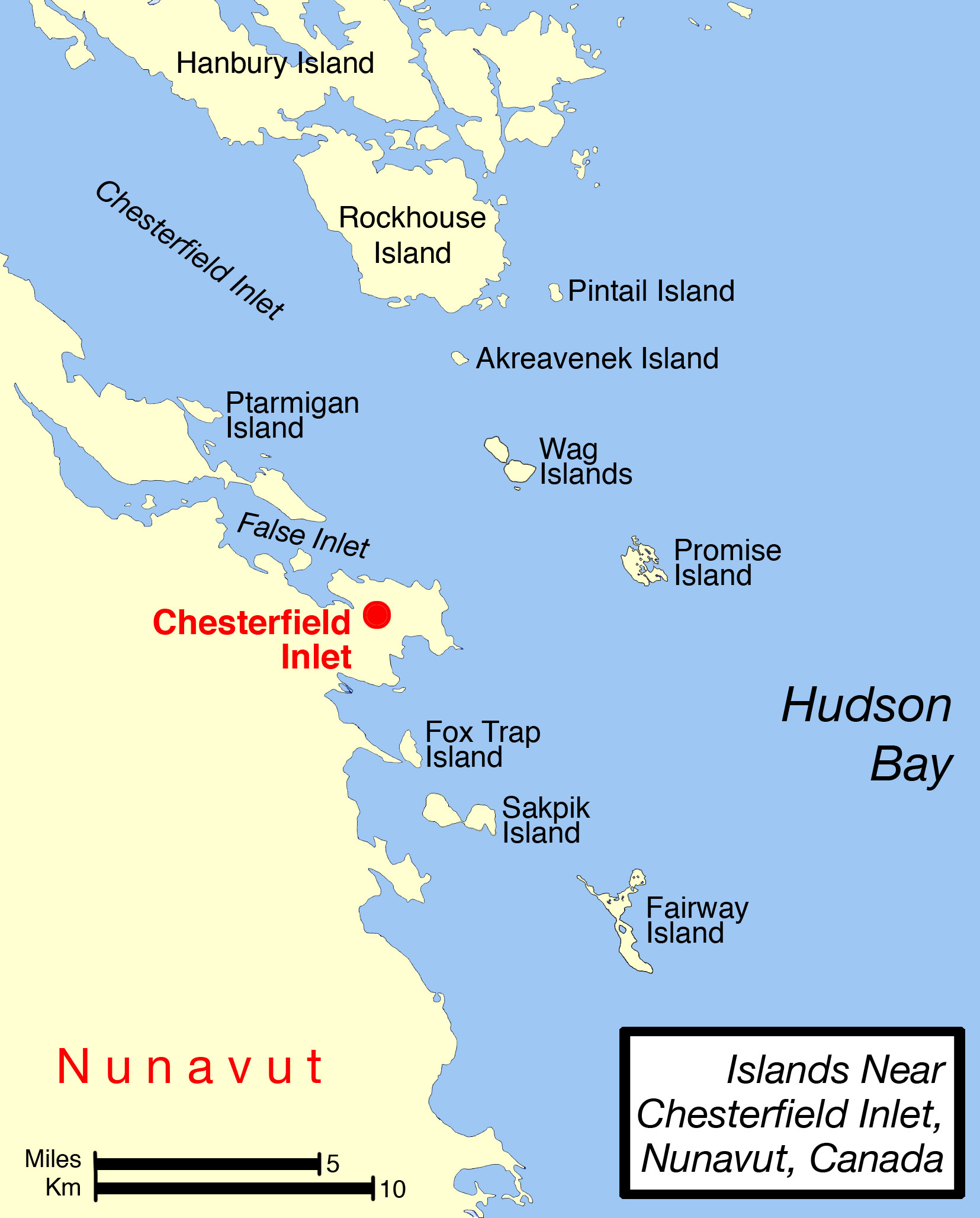

- Location within Nunavut Location within Canada

Geography
- Location: Hudson Bay
- Coordinates: 63°21′30″N 90°32′00″W
- Archipelago: Arctic Archipelago
- Highest elevation: 300 ft (90 m)

Administration
- Canada
- Nunavut: Nunavut
- Region: Kivalliq

Demographics
- Population: Uninhabited

Promise Island (Inuktitut: Nannuyuma; meaning: "polar bear") is located near the western shore of Hudson Bay. It is barely a square kilometre in area and rises 300 ft (91 m) in elevation on its northern side. It is located about 9 km (5.6 mi) from the community of Chesterfield Inlet, Nunavut, Canada, and is part of a loose chain of small islands running along the coast, including the Wag Islands and Pitsiulartok (Fairway Island).

The island is home to a wide range of wildlife, including the Arctic fox (alopex lagopus innuitus), the harbour seal (phoca hispida), the polar bear, the brown lemming (lemmus t. trimucronatus), the barren-ground caribou (rangifer arcticus), and the red phalarope.

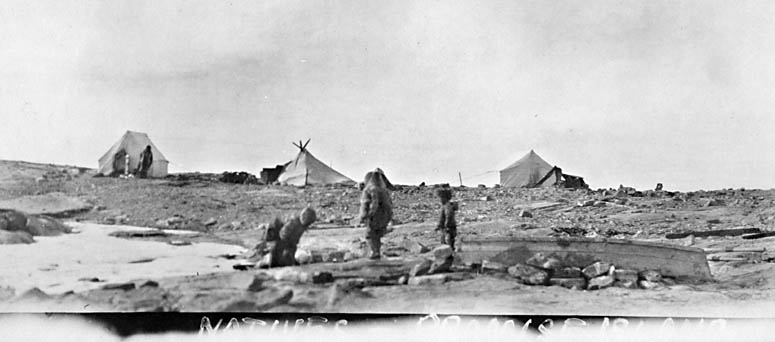
"Natives, Promise Island" Photo c. 1920-25 by Hudson's Bay Company employee Capt. George Cleveland of the motor schooner Fort Chesterfield.
