= Cape Stallworthy =

Headland in Nunavut, Canada

Cape Stallworthy Svartevaeg
- Cape
- Coordinates: 81°23′N 93°30′W
- Location: Axel Heiberg Island, Nunavut, Canada
- Offshore water bodies: Arctic Ocean

Cape Stallworthy (formerly Svartevaeg, also known as Svartevoeg) is the northernmost point of Axel Heiberg Island in the Qikiqtaaluk Region, Nunavut, Canada.

== Introduction ==
Originally named Svartevaeg ("black wall") by Otto Sverdrup, it was later renamed in honour of Royal Canadian Mounted Police officer Harry Stallworthy, who was an Arctic explorer.

Cape Stallworthy is sometimes confused with Cape Thomas Hubbard on the opposite side of Eetookashoo Bay.

It is 520 miles (840 km) from the North Pole.

== Geology ==
According to the Geological Survey of Canada (1991): "The sediments consist predominantly of shale, cross-bedded sandstone and conglomerate; the oolitic algal limestone and calcareous mudstone typical of the Grinnell locality are absent."

== Explorers ==
Frederick Cook began his 1908 North Pole journey from the cape. During this exploration, Cook noted that as he neared Svartevaeg, the carboniferous formation became more evident. He made several trips about Svartevaeg, studying the ice and land, finding better game just south of Svartevaeg Cliffs.

On June 28, 1906, Robert E. Peary planted the American flag at Cape Stallworthy (then known as Cape Thomas Hubbard) and left a stash of notes. In 1914, during the Crocker Land Expedition, Donald Baxter MacMillan, Fitzhugh Green Sr., and two guides searched for Sverdrup's records that had been left behind at Cape Stallworthy.
