= Thomas Hamlin Hubbard =

American lawyer

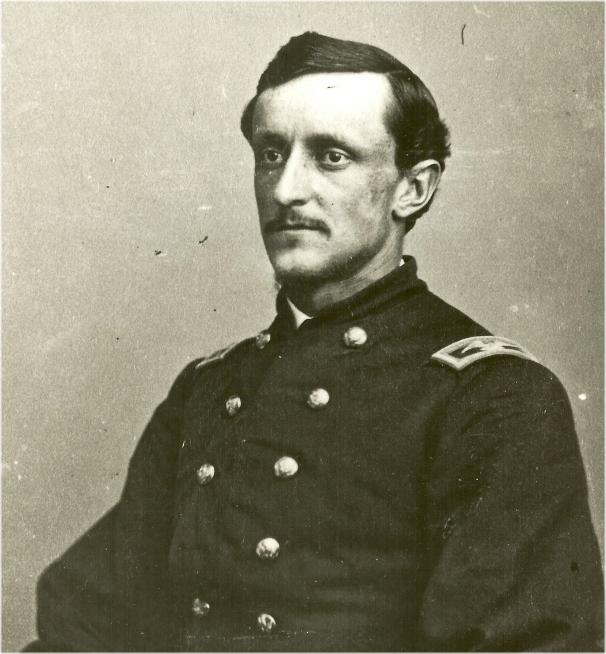
- Thomas Hamlin Hubbard
- Born: December 20, 1838; Hallowell, Maine
- Died: May 19, 1915 (aged 76); New York City, New York
- Burial place: Woodlawn Cemetery, The Bronx, New York
- Military career
- Allegiance: United States of America; Union
- Service years: 1862–1865
- Rank: Colonel; Brevet Brigadier General
- Unit: 25th Maine Infantry
- Commands: 30th Maine Infantry
- Conflicts: American Civil War
- Other work: Lawyer, financier and philanthropist

Thomas Hamlin Hubbard (December 20, 1838 – May 19, 1915) was a Union Army colonel from Maine during the Civil War who was awarded the honorary grade of brevet brigadier general, United States Volunteers, for meritorious service. After the war, Hubbard was a lawyer, railroad executive, financier, businessman and philanthropist.

Soldier, lawyer, philanthropist, and financier, Hubbard was best known for his enthusiasm for Arctic exploration, which contributed to the discovery of the North Pole. Following the death of founding President Morris K. Jesup in 1908, he became President of the Peary Arctic Club, which had been formed in 1898 to give Admiral Robert E. Peary financial backing in his polar quest. Even after this quest had ended in success Hubbard's interest in the frozen north did not end, and he was one of the financial contributors to the Donald B. MacMillan expedition in the Arctic studying the native population.

== Early life ==
Hubbard was born in Hallowell, Maine, December 20, 1838. He was the second son of Maine governor Dr. John Hubbard, who signed the unpopular Maine Liquor Law in 1851. After graduating from Bowdoin College in 1857 and studying law, he was admitted to the bar. He then moved to New York and began studies at Albany Law School. He received his LL.B. in 1861, and was admitted to the New York bar.

== In the Civil War ==
The Civil War soon broke out, and the young lawyer went to the front as a first lieutenant and adjutant with the 25th Maine Infantry, a nine-month regiment. Hubbard later enlisted in the 30th Maine Infantry as lieutenant colonel.

He had a hand in the construction of the famous Red River Dam, which was built to raise the water level so that Federal gunboats which had run aground could be floated out of danger, and his services as a whole were so conspicuous and so valuable that on June 2, 1864 he was made colonel of his regiment. He succeeded Colonel Francis Fessenden, who had been promoted to brigadier general, U.S. Volunteers, May 10, 1864. Hubbard resigned his commission on July 23, 1865. On January 13, 1866, President Andrew Johnson nominated Hubbard to the honorary grade of brevet brigadier general, to rank from March 13, 1865. The United States Senate confirmed the award on March 12, 1866.

== Post-war life ==
On January 28, 1868, Hubbard married Sibyl A. Fahnestock of Harrisburg, Pennsylvania. Two sons of this marriage died in childhood. Three children survived him, John and Anna W. Hubbard, and Mrs. Herbert S. Darlington.

Soon after the end of the war, Hubbard resumed the practice of law in New York. He gave the law up in 1894 in order to devote more time to his numerous business interests, including management of the estate of railroad magnate Mark Hopkins. He was Vice President of the Southern Pacific Company between 1896 and 1900, President of the Mexican International Railroad between 1894 and 1901 and from 1901 to 1912 of the Guatemala Central Railroad. From 1904 he was president of the International Banking Corporation (subsequently merged into the company now known as Citibank) and was a director of the American Light and Traction Company, Metropolitan Life Insurance Company, National Bank of Commerce in New York, Toledo, St. Louis and Western Railroad Company, Wabash Railroad Company and the Western Union Telegraph Company.

Hubbard was a philanthropist to many causes. Bowdoin College was one of his favorite institutions. Among the donations that remain are the Hubbard Hall (designed by Henry Vaughan) and the grand stand, which displays the motto, "Fair Play, and May the Best Man Win."

A more enduring monument is Cape Thomas Hubbard, which, from the wind-swept coast of Grant Land, faces the North Pole across reaches of grinding pack-ice, over which Robert E. Peary, another Bowdoin man, carried the Stars and Stripes in 1909.

Hubbard died in New York City on May 19, 1915. At the time of his death, he was commander-in-chief of the Military Order of the Loyal Legion of the United States.
