= Punta Dúngeness =

Headland in Argentina and Chile

Coordinates: 52°23′54″S 68°26′6″W

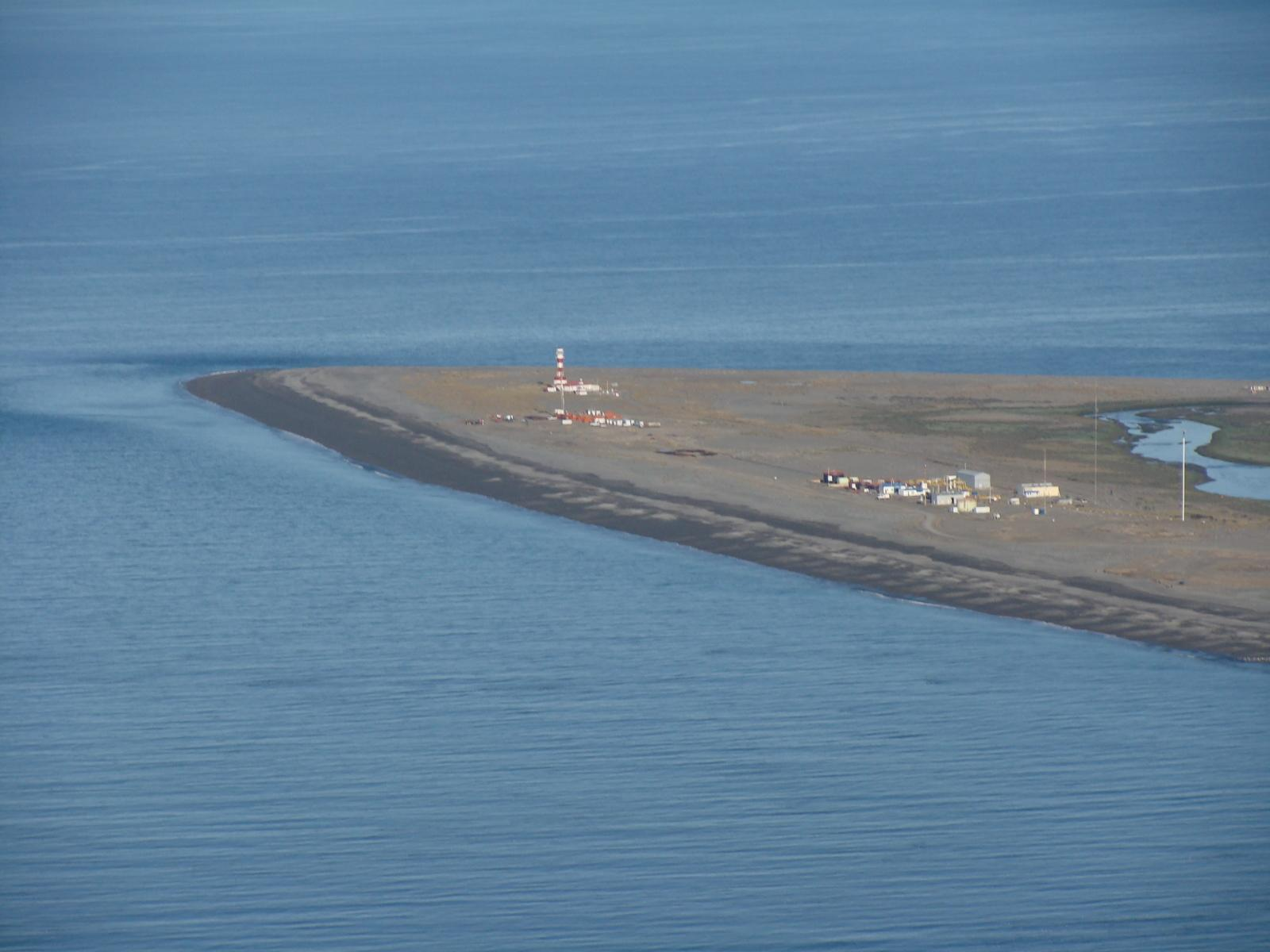
Punta Dúngeness with the lighthouse on the Chilean side of the border.

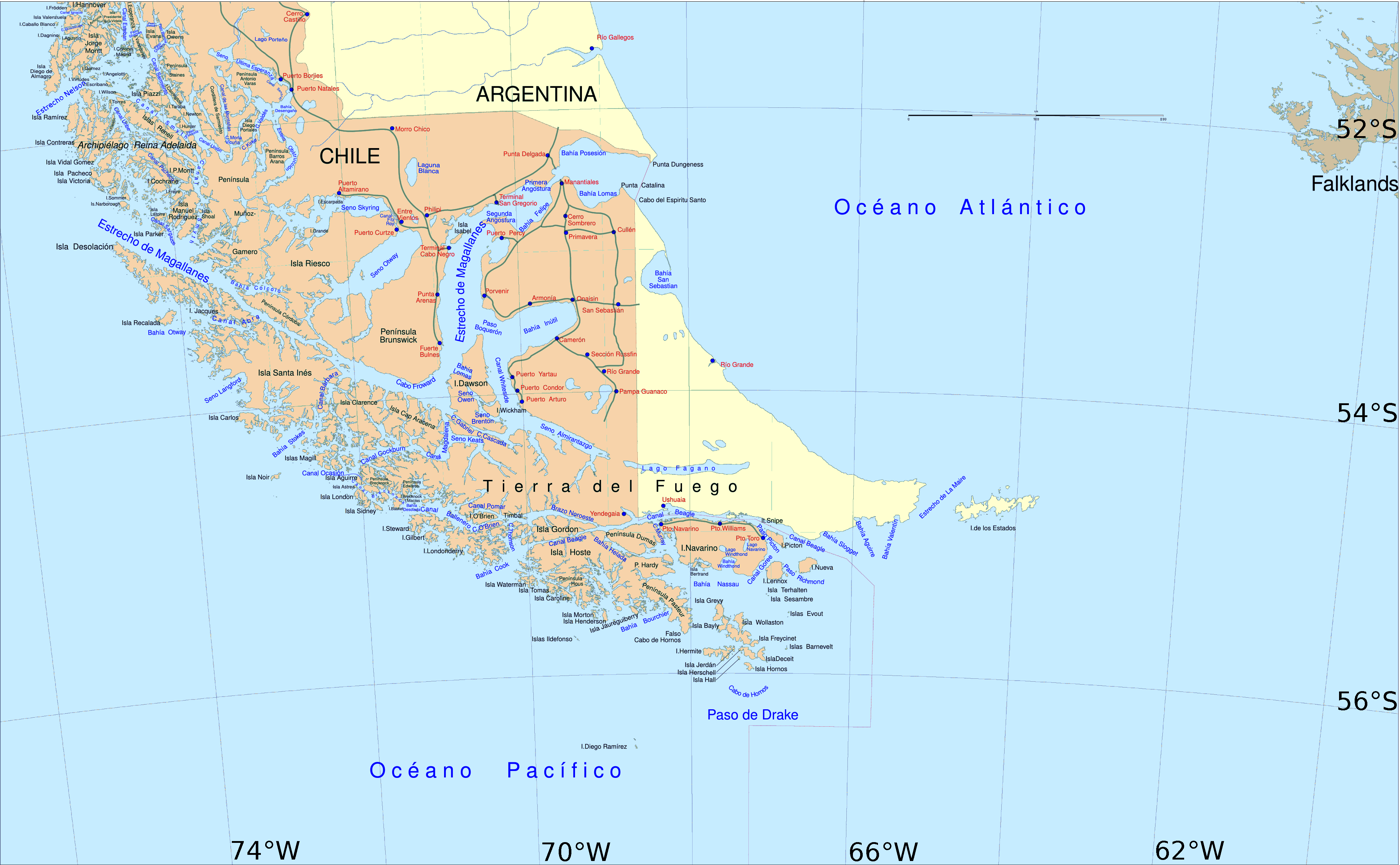
Punta Dungeness at the eastern entrance to the Strait of Magellan

Punta Dúngeness is a headland at the eastern entrance of the Strait of Magellan on its north shore, opposite Cabo del Espiritu Santo in Tierra del Fuego. West of the Punta Dungeness lies the Bahía Posesión. Punta Dungeness marks the border between Chile and Argentina, and according to the Treaty of Peace and Friendship the line between Punta Dungeness and Cabo del Espiritu Santo marks the limits of each country's territorial waters and the border between the Pacific and Atlantic Ocean. It is the southernmost point on the mainland of Argentina, and the easternmost point on the mainland of Chile. There is a lighthouse on the Chilean side. This is the only place where the Atlantic Ocean touches the shores on the mainland of Chile, at the entrance to the Strait of Magellan.

The headland was named after Dungeness on the south coast of England, to which it bears some resemblance. It was named on 17 December 1766 by the English navigator Samuel Wallis.

== Climate ==
Climate data for Punta Dúngeness
Month	Jan	Feb	Mar	Apr	May	Jun	Jul	Aug	Sep	Oct	Nov	Dec	Year
Mean daily maximum °C (°F)	15.2 (59.4)	14.9 (58.8)	13.4 (56.1)	10.7 (51.3)	7.9 (46.2)	5.9 (42.6)	5.1 (41.2)	5.5 (41.9)	7.3 (45.1)	10.3 (50.5)	12.0 (53.6)	14.0 (57.2)	10.2 (50.4)
Daily mean °C (°F)	11.5 (52.7)	11.2 (52.2)	9.9 (49.8)	7.7 (45.9)	5.2 (41.4)	3.5 (38.3)	2.8 (37.0)	3.0 (37.4)	4.5 (40.1)	6.7 (44.1)	8.3 (46.9)	10.3 (50.5)	7.1 (44.8)
Mean daily minimum °C (°F)	7.7 (45.9)	7.4 (45.3)	6.4 (43.5)	4.6 (40.3)	2.4 (36.3)	1.1 (34.0)	0.5 (32.9)	0.8 (33.4)	1.8 (35.2)	3.5 (38.3)	4.8 (40.6)	6.5 (43.7)	4.0 (39.2)
Average precipitation mm (inches)	26.4 (1.04)	18.6 (0.73)	25.3 (1.00)	24.0 (0.94)	26.5 (1.04)	21.9 (0.86)	23.0 (0.91)	18.5 (0.73)	13.0 (0.51)	11.9 (0.47)	17.7 (0.70)	27.0 (1.06)	253.8 (9.99)
Average relative humidity (%)	74	72	76	77	77	79	75	78	76	74	72	74	75
Source: Bioclimatografia de Chile
