= 25th Maine Infantry Regiment =

Union Army infantry regiment in the American Civil War

- Active: September 29, 1862, to July 10, 1863
- Country: United States
- Allegiance: Union
- Branch: Infantry

The 25th Maine Infantry Regiment was an infantry regiment that served in the Union Army during the American Civil War.

== Service ==
The 25th Maine Infantry was organized in Portland, Maine and mustered on September 29, 1862, for nine months' service under the command of Colonel Francis Fessenden.

The regiment left Maine for Washington, D.C., October 16. Attached to Casey's Division, Defenses of Washington, to February 1863. 1st Brigade, Casey's Division, XXII Corps, to April 1863. 1st Brigade, Abercrombie's Division, XXII Corps, to July 1863. Served garrison duty in the defenses of Washington, D.C., October 18, 1862, to March 24, 1863. Moved to Chantilly, Virginia, March 24, and on picket duty there until June 26. (Temporarily attached to XII Corps, Army of the Potomac.) Moved to Arlington Heights June 26, then ordered home June 30.

The 25th Maine Infantry mustered out of service July 10, 1863. Some of its members later joined the 30th Maine Volunteer Infantry Regiment.

== Casualties ==
The regiment lost a total of 20 enlisted men during service, all due to disease. One casualty was Charles H. Hill, who died Dec. 28, 1862 buried at Pine Grove Cemetery in Brunswick, ME (same cemetery as Joshua Chamberlain).

== Commanders ==
- Colonel Francis Fessenden

== Notable members ==
- 1st Lieutenant Thomas Hamlin Hubbard, adjutant - philanthropist and president of the Peary Arctic Club

== See also ==
- List of Maine Civil War units
- Maine in the American Civil War
