= Coastal Waters of Southeast Alaska and British Columbia =

Marine area on the coast of the US and Canada

The Coastal Waters of Southeast Alaska and British Columbia is a marine area designated by the International Hydrographic Organization (IHO).

It comprises waterbodies along the Pacific coast of British Columbia, Canada, and the Alaska Panhandle, United States; some waters off north-west Washington are also included.

These waterbodies include the Salish Sea (Strait of Juan de Fuca, Puget Sound, Strait of Georgia, and connecting waterbodies), Queen Charlotte Strait, Queen Charlotte Sound, Hecate Strait, Dixon Entrance, Clarence Strait, Sumner Strait, Chatham Strait, Sitka Sound, Frederick Sound, Stephens Passage and Icy Strait.

== Extent ==
The IHO defines the limits of the Coastal Waters as follows:

- On the Southwest. A line running from the Northwest extremity of Cape Flattery to Tatoosh Island (48°23'N) and thence to the Southern extreme of Bonilla Point (124°42'W) in Vancouver Island.
- On the West. A line running westerly from Black Rock Point (50°44',5N) in Vancouver Island through the Scott Islands in such a way that all the narrow waters between these islands are included in the Coastal Waters, thence to Cape St. James (Southern extremity of Queen Charlotte Islands), through this group in the same way, then from Cape Knox (54°10′N 133°06′W) Northward to the Western extreme of Langara Island and on to Point Cornwallis (132°52'W) in the Prince of Wales group, thence along the Western shores of this group, of Baranof, Kruzof, Chicagof, and Yakobi Islands, so that all the narrow waters between them are included in the coastal waters, and, finally, from Cape Bingham (58°04'N) in Yakobi Island to Cape Spencer (58°12′N 136°39′W).

== Images ==
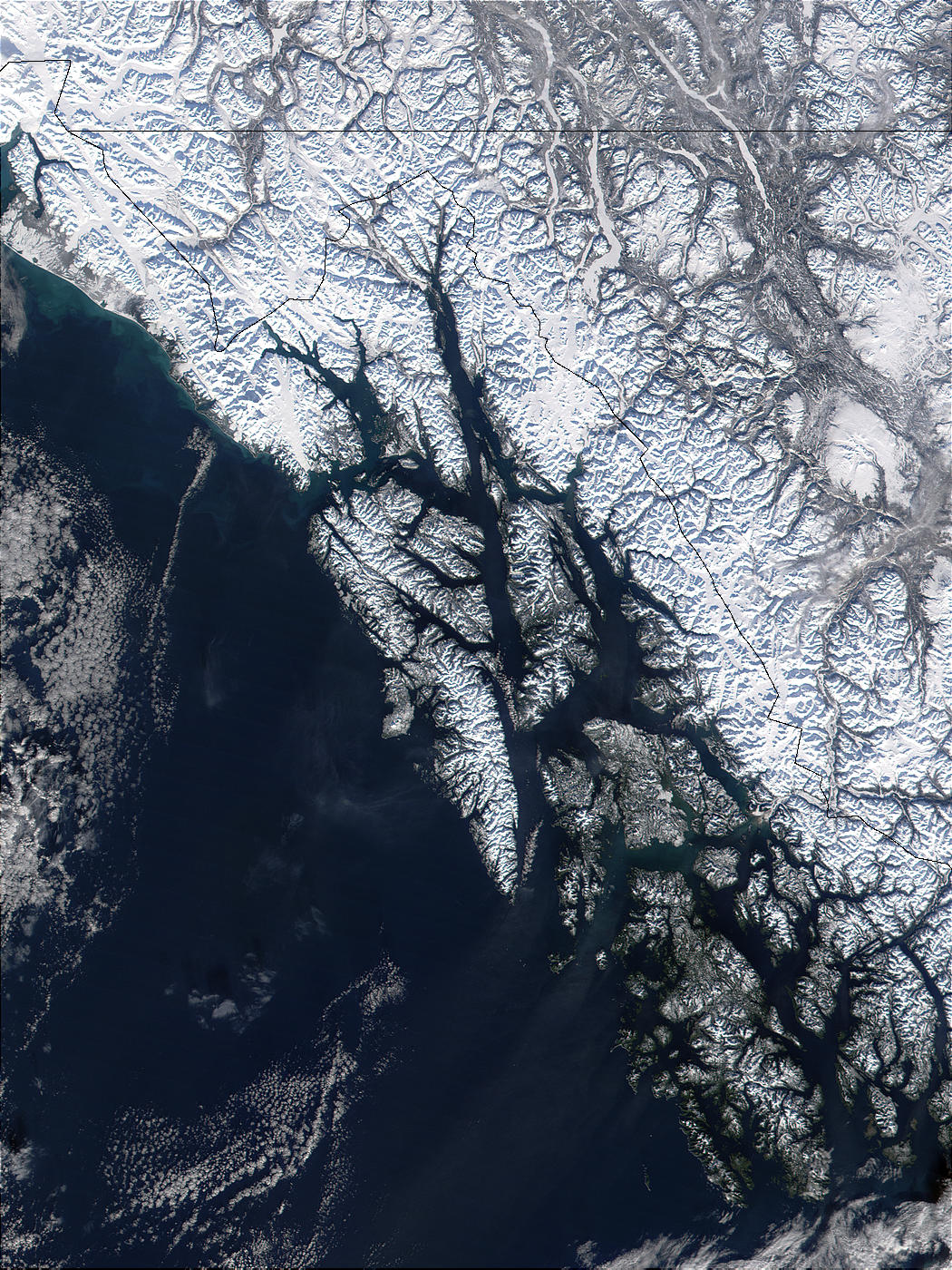
Image showing the Alexander Archipelago of south-east Alaska - the waters of the archipelago are the northern portion of the Coastal Waters.

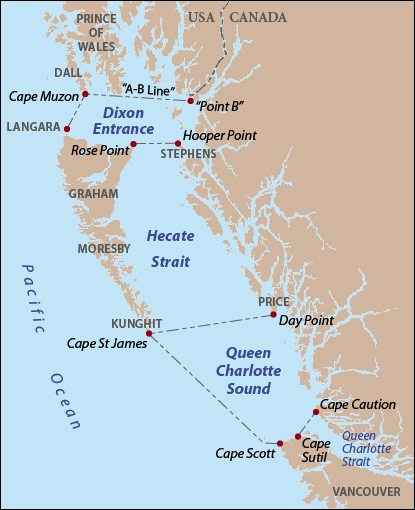
Map showing Dixon Entrance, Hecate Strait, Queen Charlotte Strait and Queen Charlotte Sound - the central portion of the Coastal Waters.

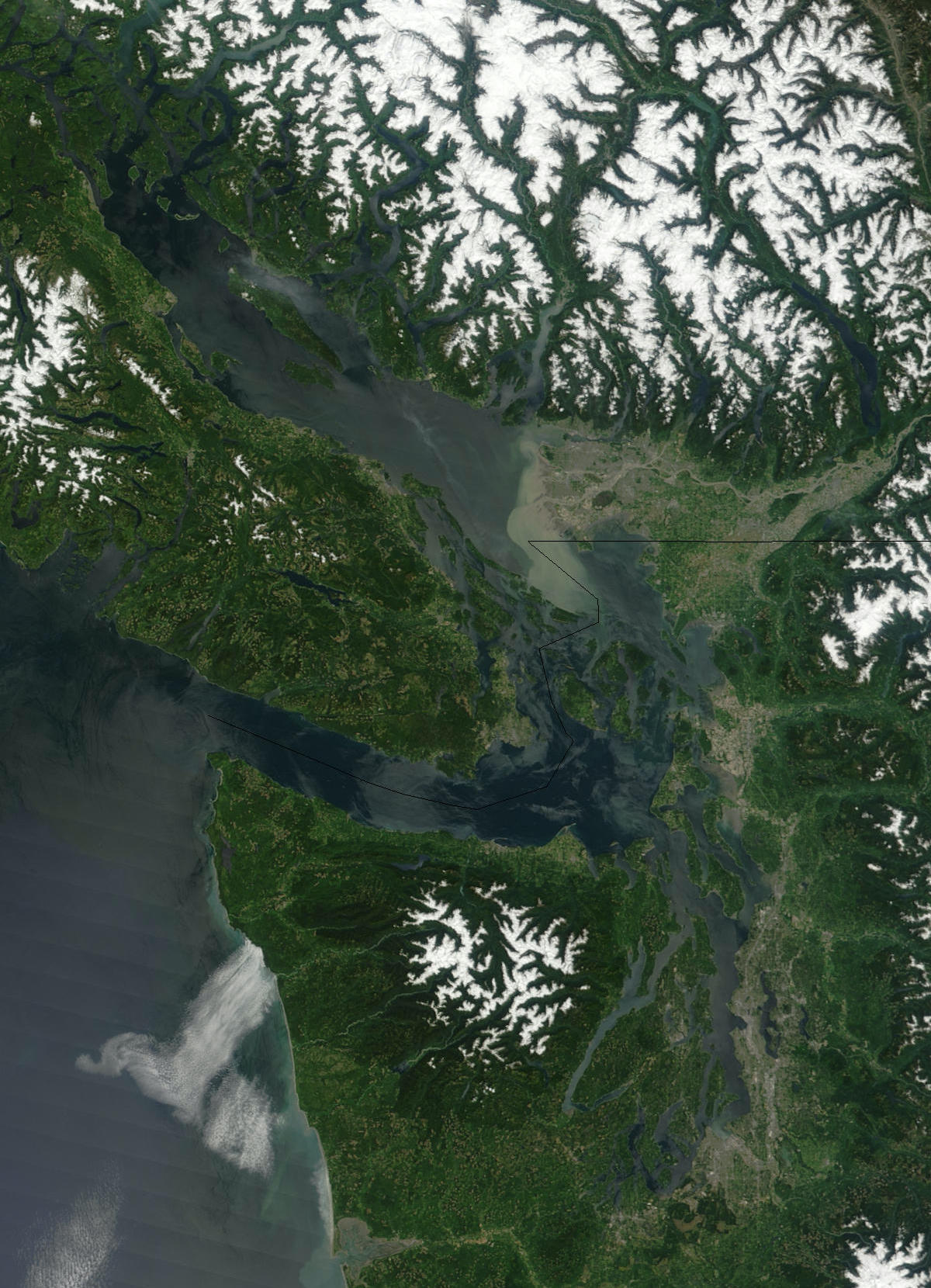
Image showing the Salish Sea, which includes the Strait of Juan de Fuca, Puget Sound and the Strait of Georgia - the southern portion of the Coastal Waters.

== See also ==
- Inside Passage
