= Cape Kohlsaat =

Point in Russia

Cape Kohlsaat (Russian: Мыс Кользат) is a point on the eastern shore of Graham Bell Island, the easternmost island of Franz Josef Land, Russia. It is also the easternmost limit of the Franz Josef Archipelago.

Its location is 81°14′N, 65°10′E, and it is important as a landmark, for Cape Kohlsaat marks the northwesternmost corner of the Kara Sea.

Being close to the area of permanent polar ice of the Arctic Ocean, the sea off Cape Kohlsaat has much pack ice almost the whole year round.
