= Harry Stallworthy =

Canadian explorer(1895–1976)

Harry Stallworthy (1895–1976) was a member of the Royal Canadian Mounted Police known for his exploration of the Arctic and expansion of Canadian sovereignty in Nunavut during territorial negotiations with Norway. Cape Stallworthy was named after him.

Stallworthy emigrated from England in 1913, one year before joining the RCMP. From 1918 to 1919 he participated in the cavalry detachment of the North-West Mounted Police as part of the Canadian Expeditionary Force in Flanders. From 1930 to 1932, he organised a 65 day-long patrol which travelled over 2,000 kilometres (1,200 miles) in search of German biologist Hans Krüger, who had disappeared in the Bache Peninsula. From 1934 to 1935, he guided the Oxford University Ellesmere Land Expedition. On this expedition he reached the latitude 82 degrees 25 minutes north, following which he was made a fellow of the Royal Geographical Society. Stallworthy died on December 25, 1976 in Comox, British Columbia, at the age of 81.
