= Horse Holm =

Island in Shetland Islands, Scotland

Coordinates: 59.85002°N 1.31645°W

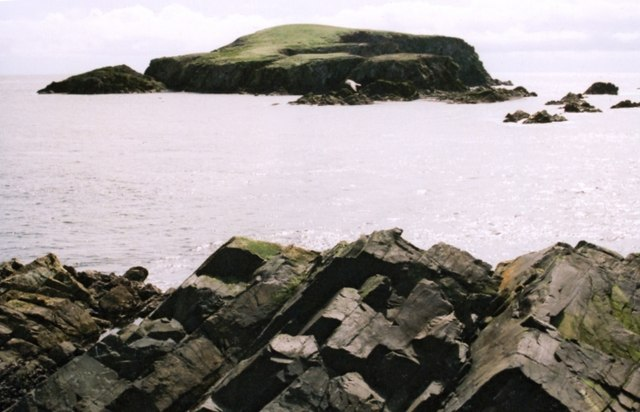
Horse Holm from Hog of Ness

Horse Island or Horse Holm, known locally as Da Holm, is one of the Shetland Islands. It lies about 2.3 km west of Sumburgh Head at the south tip of the Mainland, Shetland. In the Norn language, it was called Hundiholmi (Dog Island) but was later renamed Horse Holm. It is used as an alignment point by local fishermen for several fishing marks.

== Footnotes ==
This article incorporates text from Shetlopedia
