= Fort Chesterfield (schooner) =

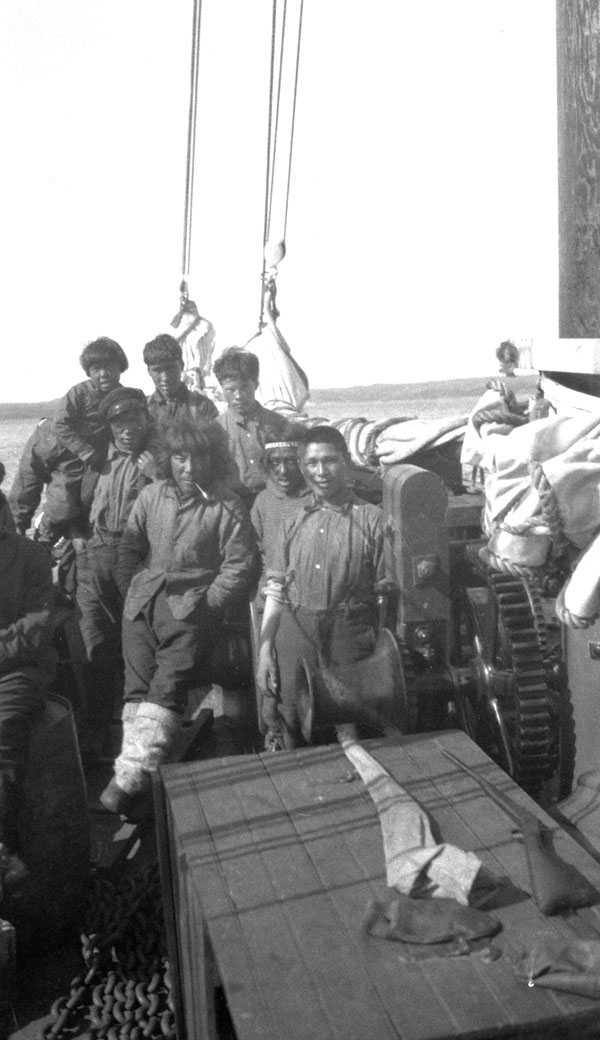
- Fort Chesterfield crew, May 1926. Photo by L. T. Burwash.

History
- Name: Fort Chesterfield
- Owner: Hudson's Bay Company
- Route: Hudson Bay
- Builder: B. Burry, Glovertown, Newfoundland
- Completed: 1920
- Acquired: 1921 by HBC

General characteristics
- Class & type: motor schooner
- Tonnage: 72 tons
- Length: 80 ft (24 m)
- Beam: 21 ft (6.4 m)
- Height: 9 ft (2.7 m)
- Propulsion: 75 hp (56 kW) motor
- Crew: ten crewmen

Fort Chesterfield, known as Umiajuatnak by the Inuit, was a Hudson's Bay Company motor schooner which distributed supplies arriving in Chesterfield Inlet to isolated communities along Hudson Bay, including Repulse Bay, Eskimo Point, Coral Harbour, Fullerton Harbour, Wager Bay, and the inland community of Baker Lake, during the 1920s. It established a transportation and communications network for the entire region.

The two-masted, 72-ton, 80’x21’x9’ vessel was built in 1920, by B. Burry, in Glovertown, Newfoundland, and was sold in St. John's, to the Hudson's Bay Company in the first half of 1921.

Originally named the L. Burry, it was renamed Fort Chesterfield by July 1921. Capt. Jean Berthe, an HBC employee, formerly of the Nelson River district, oversaw the overhauling of the vessel for ice conditions and the installation of a 75 hp motor, and accompanied it to Chesterfield Inlet in August 1921.

By June 1924, Capt. George Cleveland of the HBC had assumed command of Fort Chesterfield. Capt. Berthe evidently left the HBC to join the rival trading company, Revillon Frères.

In August 1924, Fort Chesterfield left for Coral Harbour, on Southampton Island, to establish a trading post there. In addition to Capt. Cleveland, his engineer Mr. H. E. Weller, and the crew of seven Inuit men and two boys, they were joined by Harry Stallworthy of the RCMP, Capt. G. E. Mack, Dudley Copeland, and Bill Peters of the HBC, and two Inuit families. Chesterfield arrived at the island on 4 August 1924, and found a suitable site for the new post, a campsite already inhabited by Aivilingmiut families. They landed about 100 tonnes of building materials, fuel, food, and trade goods, and began construction of the new post. Bill Peters, Dudley Copeland, and the two Inuit families who that had accompanied them remained behind to operate the post, and Capt. Cleveland returned with Fort Chesterfield to Chesterfield Inlet. Capt. Cleveland fell sick and died that winter.

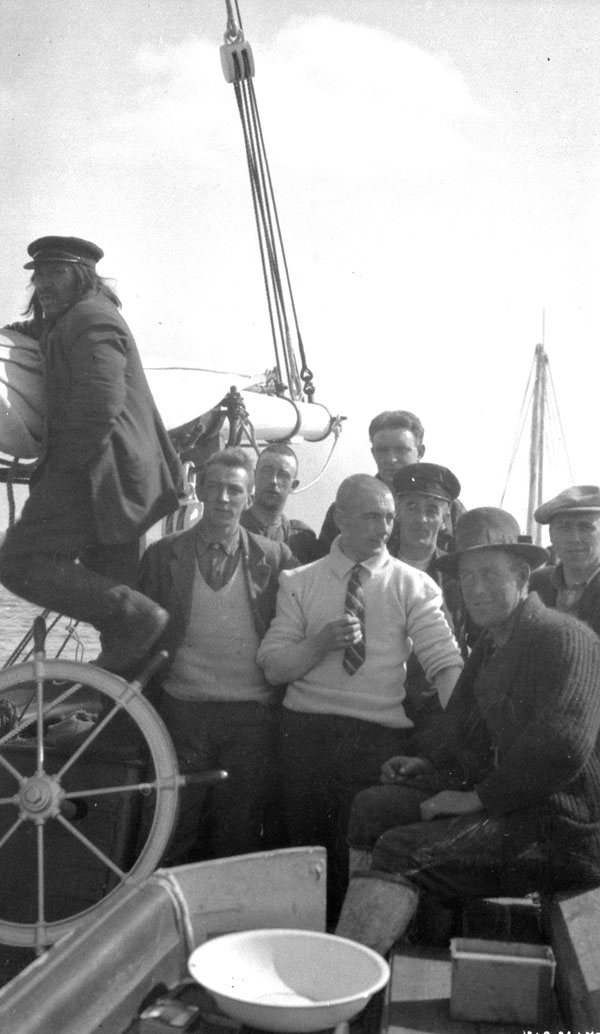
Crowd aboard Fort Chesterfield, May 1926
