= Red Point (Nova Scotia) =

Peninsula in Nova Scotia, Canada

Coordinates: 45°35′00″N 60°44′57″W

Location of Red Point in Nova Scotia

Red Point is a headland located at the southwestern extremity of Cape Breton Island in the Canadian province of Nova Scotia.
