= Espíritu Santo Cape =

Cape of Chile and Argentina

Coordinates: 52°23′54″S 68°26′6″W

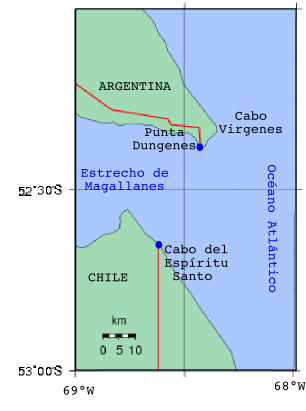
Espíritu Santo Cape at the eastern end of the Strait of Magellan

Espíritu Santo Cape (Spanish: Cabo del Espíritu Santo) is a headland in Tierra del Fuego at the eastern entrance of the Strait of Magellan on its southern, opposite Punta Dungeness in the mainland. Espíritu Santo Cape marks the border between Chile and Argentina, and according to the Treaty of Peace and Friendship of 1984 between Chile and Argentina the line between Punta Dungeness and Cabo del Espiritu Santo marks the limits of each country's territorial waters.
