= 30th Maine Infantry Regiment =

- Active: January 8, 1864 – August 20, 1865
- Country: United States
- Allegiance: Union
- Branch: Infantry
- Engagements: Red River Campaign; Battle of Mansfield; Battle of Fort Stevens

The 30th Maine Infantry Regiment was an infantry regiment that served in the Union Army during the American Civil War.

== Service ==
The 30th Maine Infantry was organized in Augusta, Maine and mustered in on January 8, 1864, for three years' service. While recruiting the regiment received veterans and new recruits from the 13th Maine Infantry, which had been reduced to battalion strength.

The regiment was attached to 3rd Brigade, 1st Division, XIX Corps, Department of the Gulf, to July 1864, and Army of the Shenandoah, Middle Military Division, to December 1864. Garrison of Winchester, Virginia, Army of the Shenandoah, to April 1865. Department of Washington to June 1865. District of Savannah, Georgia, Department of the South, to August 1865.

The 30th Maine Infantry mustered out of service August 20, 1865.

== Detailed service ==
Left Maine for New Orleans, La., January 31, 1864, arriving February 16. Duty at Algiers, La., February 16–18, 1864. Moved to Franklin February 18, and duty there until March 15. Red River Campaign March 15 – May 22. Advance to Alexandria March 15–26, and to Natchitoches March 29 – April 2. Battle of Sabine Cross Roads April 8. Pleasant Hill April 9. Cane River Crossing April 23. Construction of dam at Alexandria April 30 – May 10. Retreat to Morganza May 13–20. Mansura May 16. At Morganza until July 2. Moved to New Orleans, thence to Fortress Monroe and Bermuda Hundred, Va., July 2–18. Duty at Deep Bottom until July 31. Moved to Washington, D.C., then to Harpers Ferry, W. Va. Sheridan's Shenandoah Valley Campaign August 7 – November 28. On detached duty, guarding supply trains, stores, etc., until October 26. Bunker Hill October 25. Duty near Middletown until November, and at Newtown until January 1865. At Winchester and Stevenson's Depot until April 1865. Moved to Washington, D.C., April 20, and duty there until June 30. Provost guard during the Grand Review of the Armies May 23–24. Moved to Savannah, Ga., June 30 – July 7, and duty there until August.

== Casualties ==
The regiment lost a total of 290 men during service; 3 officers and 31 enlisted men killed or mortally wounded, 2 officers and 254 enlisted men due to disease.

== Commanders ==
- Colonel Francis Fessenden
- Colonel Thomas Hamlin Hubbard

== See also ==
- List of Maine Civil War units
- Maine in the American Civil War
