= Cape Thomas Hubbard =

Headland in Nunavut, Canada

Coordinates: 81°22′03″N 094°07′07″W

Cape Thomas Hubbard is a headland located in the northern Canadian territory of Nunavut. Projecting into the Arctic Ocean, it is situated on the northern tip of Axel Heiberg Island, 320 mi (510 km) from Etah, Greenland.

== History ==
It was reached by Robert Peary in June 1906, and was the starting point of Donald B. MacMillan's search for nonexistent Crocker Land in April 1914.

The cape was named by Peary in honor of General Thomas Hamlin Hubbard, president of the Peary Arctic Club in New York, who was one of Peary's financial contributors and a fellow alumni of Bowdoin College.
